= Catsuits and bodysuits in popular media =

Juan-José Moréno (Fernand Herrmann) confronts Irma Vep (Musidora) in Les Vampires episode "Hypnotic Eyes".

Catsuits are a recurring costume for fictional characters in various media, as well as for entertainers, especially for use in musical performances. They are sometimes referred to as "bodysuits", especially in reference to a full-body suit worn by a man (although bodysuit usually refers to a legless garment); catsuit is typically used only in reference to women.

The catsuit has been identified as a film-maker's costume of choice for stealth. In films like Irma Vep, Les Vampires and Heroic Trio, crime and catsuits are featured together, as well as its major original use in Alfred Hitchcock's To Catch a Thief.

A trend of bodysuits was observed by film reviewer Alan Farrell in his book High Cheekbones, Pouty Lips, Tight Jeans, and a number of occurrences of the garb in films were mentioned – Charlize Theron in Aeon Flux, Milla Jovovich in the fourth and fifth film of the Resident Evil franchise, Carrie-Anne Moss in The Matrix, Angelina Jolie in Lara Croft: Tomb Raider, Kate Beckinsale in Underworld, and Raquel Welch in Fantastic Voyage. The trend of leather and vinyl catsuits were identified as an attempt to redefine the gender role of women through films. Theresa L. Geller described the catsuit as a part of the Hollywood tough chic paradigm in an article published in the journal Frontiers. That view was shared by Sherrie A. Inness in her book Action Chicks, which also included computer games and professional wrestling in that paradigm. The Action Heroine's Handbook describes the catsuit as one of the three options of the first rule of thumb described in the book: "Dress to accentuate your best physical assets". Action Chicks: New Images of Tough Women in Popular Culture by Sherrie A. Inness describes catsuits as an iconic garb of female TV and film characters.

== Movies and television series ==
Notable uses of catsuits or similar full-body garments include:

- Æon Flux: In both the television series and the 2005 film starring Charlize Theron.
- A.I. Artificial Intelligence: Ashley Scott plays android Gigolo Jane wearing a tight catsuit.
- The Amazing Spider-Man duology & Sam Raimi's Spider-Man trilogy: portrayed by Andrew Garfield and Tobey Maguire, respectively. In both versions, Peter Parker designs and makes the spider-suit himself after gaining his spider-abilities. It consists of a red-and-blue lycra complete with spider-motif.
- Austin Powers: International Man of Mystery: Liz Hurley and Mimi Rogers appear in black leather catsuits in a tribute to Emma Peel.
- The Avengers: Cathy Gale (played by Honor Blackman, better known for the role of Pussy Galore in Goldfinger) wore black leather catsuits that took four-hour fitting sessions for the shooting. She opted for the leather as her clothes were getting repeatedly ripped off during fight scenes, including one scene that had her trousers ripped in close-up. Her fetishistic garb was identified as a reason behind The Avengers' entry into cult status. Emma Peel (played by Diana Rigg) wore a number of black leather catsuits during the monochrome series, but then switched to wearing colorful psychedelic jumpsuits as the show entered Technicolor. Emma Peel's black leather catsuit was identified as a precursor to the popularity of leather, spandex and vinyl bodysuits in subcultures such as Punk and Leathermen. Her character has been described as the inspiration for most iconic bodysuit-clad female characters that followed, including the Catwoman, Monica Vitti in Modesty Blaise, Jane Fonda in Barbarella, and Marianne Faithfull in The Girl on a Motorcycle. The catsuits and fashion paraphernalia in The Avengers, including the leather boots, kept the youth "at home on Saturday nights" according to The Spectator. Novelist and social analyst Gillian Freeman attributed this popularity to the "kinkiness" of the attire of Gale and Peel in The Undergrowth of Literature, her seminal study on pornography.
  - The Avengers: In the 1998 film based on the series, Uma Thurman wears a black pleather catsuit and a black PVC catsuit as Emma Peel and her evil clone respectively.
- Batman: Batgirl has appeared in various forms of the catsuit throughout the Batman film, TV and comic book franchises. Catwoman has worn a variety of lurex, PVC, leather and spandex catsuits in the TV series, film and comic book franchises. The villainess Harley Quinn is renowned for her distinctive costume – a red and black diamond-checked catsuit in the style of a harlequin jester.
  - Batman (1966 film): Lee Meriwether as Catwoman, wears a black tight shiny catsuit.
  - Batman (TV series): Adam West's version of Batman wears a spandex suit.
  - Batman Forever: Jim Carrey wears a number of flamboyant green spandex catsuits for his role as The Riddler.
  - Batman Returns: Michelle Pfeiffer (Catwoman) wears the catsuit, and European fetish magazine «O» claims that the popularity of her costume has taken forward the social approval of fetish costumes, a claim partially acknowledged by scholarly sources.
  - Catwoman: Halle Berry dons a black catsuit when she interrupted a jewelry-store robbery-in-progress. She later gets a new 2-piece black leather catsuit that she famously wears for the rest of the film.
  - Batman & Robin: Poison Ivy (Uma Thurman) wears two flamboyant spandex catsuits.
  - The Dark Knight Rises: Anne Hathaway (Catwoman) wears a very different version of the catsuit from previous films, consisting of two layers of material, the outer being polyurethane coated spandex. Utilizing non-polyester fabrics created less sheen, compared to the costume design in the previous film (Batman Returns) featuring Catwoman.
- Buck Rogers in the 25th Century: Wilma Deering (played by Erin Gray) wore disco-inspired spandex catsuits during the show's first season.
- The Cannonball Run: Jill Rivers (Tara Buckman) and Marcie Thatcher (Adrienne Barbeau) drive a black Lamborghini Countach dressed in tight shiny one-piece race suits.
- Cat's Eye: The criminal trio of sisters Rui, Hitomi and Ai wear spandex catsuits throughout the anime film. In the live action version the catsuits are worn by Miss Japan 1992 Norika Fujiwara (Rui), Izumi Inamori (Hitomi) and teen icon Yuki Uchida (Ai).
- Charlie's Angels & Full Throttle : Cameron Diaz appears in a white spandex catsuit, she also appears in a silver one during the film's opening scene. Lucy Liu and Drew Barrymore appear in black catsuits (during the Alley fight scene) and the villainess Vivian Wood (Kelly Lynch) appears in a sleeveless black latex catsuit and leather jacket. The Angels also wear blue catsuits when on the race track. Liu appears in a silver catsuit while being latched to a car in Full Throttle.
- Colombiana: Zoe Saldaña changes into a black catsuit in order to perform an assassination requiring stealth and flexibility that would not be possible in regular clothing.
- Doctor Who: Travelling companion Zoe Heriot wears a sparkling catsuit, apparently common in the "21st century".
- Fantastic Voyage: the cast uses tight white one-piece diving suits.
- Galaxina: Dorothy Stratten wears white spandex catsuit during the whole film.
- G.I. Joe: A Real American Hero: Scarlett, the GI Joe Team's counter-intelligence specialist and lead heroine, wears a yellow orange and violet leotard-catsuit with matching gloves and boots.
- G.I. Joe: The Rise of Cobra: Scarlett, the GI Joe Team's counter-intelligence specialist and lead heroine (Rachel Nichols), wears a black catsuit, as does the lead female villain called the Baroness (Sienna Miller).
- The Girl on a Motorcycle: the female protagonist (Marianne Faithfull) rides a motorcycle through Europe wearing only a leather catsuit.
- Irma Vep: Irma Vep (played by Maggie Cheung) spends most of the film dressed in a tight black latex catsuit, jumping from one Parisian rooftop to another and defending her director's odd choices to hostile crew members and journalists. In the TV series Les Vampires, the inspiration of Irma Vep, Musidora wears the same costume and make-up as Cheung. This particular look also appears in Mark of the Vampire for Carroll Borland's characterization of vampiress Phoebe Duprey. Irma Vep was included in the X-list (National Society of Film Critics' movies that turn us on) for the catsuit worn by Cheung. In the film the costume is devised by bisexual costume designer Zoe (played by Natalie Richard), enamored by Irma in the costume, as a vague reminiscent Michelle Pfeiffer costume in Batman Returns.
- The Incredibles: Mr. Incredible (voiced by Craig T. Nelson), Elastigirl (voiced by Holly Hunter), Violet (voiced by Sarah Vowell), Dash (voiced by Spencer Fox in the first film and Huck Milner in the second film), and Jack Jack wear red spandex suits while Frozone (voiced by Samuel L. Jackson) wears a light blue/white spandex suit.
- Jay and Silent Bob Strike Back: The criminal quartet forming the C.L.I.T. syndicate (Eliza Dushku, Shannon Elizabeth, Ali Larter and Jennifer Schwalbach Smith) wears black catsuits.
- Kappa Mikey: Mitsuki wears a black catsuit with yellow details as her spy outfit on the episode Le Femme Mitsuki.
- Kill Bill Volume 1: Beatrix Kiddo (Uma Thurman) wears a yellow leather catsuit-like two-piece suit with black stripes in a tribute to Bruce Lee's iconic tracksuit in Game of Death.
- Kim Possible: The character Shego wears a green and black catsuit as her trademark outfit. Kim Possible has also worn a catsuit on multiple occasions, including an actual leopard-print cat suit (as Sheela of the Leopard People) as well as Shego's outfit. In the 4th season, Kim got a custom white full body battle suit.
- Lajja: Bollywood actress and dancer Urmila Matondkar appears in a gold pleather catsuit in the opening item number "Aa Hi Jaiye".
- Lupin III: Fujiko Mine wears a catsuit inspired by Marianne Faithfull in The Girl on a Motorcycle
- Marvel Cinematic Universe (aka MCU): is a series of live-action blockbuster Superhero films & TV series set in a massive shared universe centered on Marvel Comics characters, starting with Iron Man:
  - Scott Lang / Ant-Man: First appears in Ant-Man, portrayed by Paul Rudd. A burglar that decides to turn his life around by wearing a technologically advanced biker-suit that can shrink and grow him at will.
  - Nebula: First appears in Guardians of the Galaxy, portrayed by Karen Gillan.
  - Peter Parker / Spider-Man: First appears in Captain America: Civil War, portrayed by Tom Holland. Unlike the character's previous non-MCU live-action film portrayals (by Tobey Maguire and Andrew Garfield), this version of the character's iconic red-and-blue suit is more technologically advanced thanks to Tony Stark. At the end of Spider-Man: No Way Home, Parker tells Stephen Strange to cast a spell that makes the world forget his civilian identity, losing access to his Stark tech suits in the process. He creates a new homemade red and blue suit out of fabric, taking design cues from the ones worn by his multiversal counterparts, "Peter-Two" (portrayed by Tobey Maguire) and "Peter-Three" (portrayed by Andrew Garfield).
  - Steve Rogers / Captain America: First appears in Captain America: The First Avenger, portrayed by Chris Evans. Designed to be a patriotic hero, his suit is imbued with the Star-Spangled Banner-motif.
  - Natasha Romanoff / Black Widow: First appears in Iron Man 2, portrayed by Scarlett Johansson. She is a highly trained ex-KGB spy that is known for her spandex catsuits.
  - Shuri / Black Panther: First appears in Black Panther, portrayed by Letitia Wright. The younger sister of King T'Challa who becomes the Black Panther following her brother's sudden death from an unspecified illness (as a result of the studio not recasting the character after Chadwick Boseman died of colon cancer in 2020). She wears a black catsuit similar to T'Challa's that has silver and gold accents.
  - T'Challa / Black Panther: First appears in Captain America: Civil War, portrayed by Chadwick Boseman. The ruler of the fictional African kingdom Wakanda who wears a literal catsuit designed to emulate a black panther.
- The Matrix trilogy: Trinity (Carrie-Anne Moss) wears a black PVC catsuit. Her androgynous appeal in the film was carefully designed in PVC catsuits, at times by trench coats, generating enormous following, especially among cybergeeks. The role and costume launched her into stardom. Trinity's shift from the maiden with longer hair and softer garbs to the black vinyl catsuit has been commented on as a statement in gender identity. Kym Barrett, the costume designer, made 15 versions of the catsuit, all designed to look the same on screen. She was nominated by the Costume Designers Guild in 2001 as the Best Costume Designer for her designs for Matrix characters. While discussing The Matrix she said that she "wanted to go just from the script – to come up with clothes that weren't connected to a certain time or place".
- The Middleman: one episode shows Natalie Morales wearing a tight leather one-piece suit.
- Mighty Morphin Power Rangers: The Rangers wear full body spandex suits, ranging in colors of the rainbow. Every reincarnation of the series features different designs for the Ranger's suits, although sticking to the rainbow colors. The 2017 film changed the suits to an organic mechanized armor (similar to Iron Man's armor) that emerges from the wearer's body when tapping into the Morphing Grid.
- The Rebel Margit Saad wears a cat suit costume in a scene with Tony Hancock dressed as a rooster.
- Rubí: Rubí Pérez Ochoa (Bárbara Mori) is seen entering a Halloween party wearing a black skintight Catwoman outfit with matching cat ears.
- Star Trek: Catsuits and bodysuits were worn by many extraterrestrial species and characters, of which the most notable is the Borg bodysuit.
  - Star Trek: Deep Space Nine: Kira Nerys (Nana Visitor) wears a catsuit as her Bajoran uniform.
  - Star Trek: Voyager: Seven of Nine (Jeri Ryan) and Kes (Jennifer Lien) wore several catsuits throughout the show, some of Seven of Nine's even contained built in corsets.
  - Star Trek: Enterprise: Continuing the Star Trek tradition from previous series, T'Pol (Jolene Blalock) wore a catsuit.
- Superman: Clark Kent's iconic red-and-blue lycra suit has been worn by many actors, nl: Christopher Reeve.
- Swindle (2013 film): Amanda Benson (Ariana Grande) wears a black catsuit during the final confrontation with Swindell.
- Tomb Raider series:
  - Lara Croft Tomb Raider: The Cradle of Life: Angelina Jolie as Lara Croft appears in a thermal silver spandex catsuit.
- Totally Spies!: Clover, Alex and Sam wear red, yellow and green catsuits respectively as their spy outfits.
- Tron: Yori (Cindy Morgan) wears a tight neon shining catsuit.
- Underworld: Selene (Kate Beckinsale) wears a black catsuit with matching leather corset.
- X-Men (2000 film): All members of the X-Men team (male and female) wear black leather catsuits as their official uniform.

== Music videos ==
Notable uses of catsuits or similar full-body garments include:

- "Black Widow" – Iggy Azalea and Rita Ora wear leather catsuits in the video, with Ora in red and black, and Azalea in black and white.
- "Groove Is in the Heart" – Lady Miss Kier wears a spandex catsuit in some of it.
- "Confide in Me" – Kylie Minogue wears a black shiny lycra catsuit.
- "Forever Young" – Alphaville's lead singer, Marian Gold wears a red jumpsuit.
- "Human Nature" – Madonna wears a black PVC catsuit. She recorded the song to lash out at the outcry over her book Sex, and to stretch the point wears a catsuit along with ropes and chains in the video.
- "I'm Good (Blue)" – Bebe Rexha wears a blue latex catsuit. It is credited for the song reaching number one in various countries, including the United Kingdom and Australia.
- "Independent Women Part I" – Michelle Williams wears a copper red pleather catsuit.
- "It's a Fine Day" – Opus III's Kirsty Hawkshaw wears a black catsuit.
- "It's Your Duty" – Lene Nystrøm wears a red glossy Teddy.
- "I Believe in a Thing Called Love" – The Darkness's Justin Hawkins wears a catsuit.
- "I Want Candy" – Melanie C (alias Sporty Spice) wears a black pleather catsuit.
- "Just a Little" – Liberty X's Kelli Young and Jessica Taylor wear black latex catsuits.
- "Let the Beat Control Your Body" – 2 Unlimited: one dancer wears a shiny lycra catsuit, two dancers a black PVC coated catsuit.
- "My Lovin' (You're Never Gonna Get It)" – En Vogue: A male dancer wears a metallic lycra full suit with hood.
- "More Than a Woman" – Aaliyah wears a white leather catsuit.
- "Move That Body" – Technotronic: The lead singer wears a silver metallic lycra catsuit.
- "Oops!... I Did It Again" – Britney Spears wears a red shiny catsuit. The catsuit presented with a number of problems during shooting of the video. It trapped so much heat that sweat flew off her sleeves every time she flicked a hand or twirled. The suit flattened her breasts and extra padding had to be added, which kept slipping off.
- "Rhythm is a Dancer" – Snap!: Singer Thea Austin wears a black catsuit while dancing on an elevated platform.
- "Say You'll Be There" – Victoria Beckham (alias Posh Spice) wears a sleeveless black PVC catsuit.
- "There You Go" – Pink wears a white leather catsuit.
- "Too Much" – Victoria Beckham (alias Posh Spice) wears a black PVC catsuit with a feline headdress.
- "Toxic" – Britney Spears wears a black pleather catsuit.
- "Who Do You Think You Are" – Victoria Beckham (alias Posh Spice) wears a silver lurex catsuit.
- "Heart-Shaped Glasses (When the Heart Guides the Hand)" – Marilyn Manson appears in a black leather catsuit.
- "Sexy! No No No..." – All members of Girls Aloud (Cheryl Cole, Nadine Coyle, Sarah Harding, Nicola Roberts and Kimberley Walsh) wearing black latex catsuits.
- "I Do" – 3LW's Kiely Williams wearing a black leather catsuit.
- "Cry For You" – September (alias Petra Marklund) wears a black catsuit in the video for the UK version.
- "Feedback" – Janet Jackson wears a black catsuit with knee pads and matching boots jumping from planet to planet in a space/future themed music video
- "Light Years Beyond" – Electric Citizen's Laura Dolan wears a black leather catsuit.
- "Poker Face" – Lady Gaga wears a black catsuit.
- "Paparazzi" – Lady Gaga wears white and blue spandex ensemble as well as a black and yellow polka dot Mickey Mouse-inspired catsuit.
- "Telephone" – Lady Gaga wears a cheetah-print catsuit.
- "On The Floor" – Jennifer Lopez wears a nude catsuit with sliver gems.
- "Vroom! Vroom!" – Charli XCX wears a black faux leather catsuit while these four backup dancers are around her.
- "Sufran Con Lo Que Yo Gozo" – Gloria Trevi can be seen wearing a shiny black skin-tight catsuit while choreographing dance gestures.
- "Your Addiction" – Night Club lead vocalist Emily Kavanaugh is seen walking into a room initially wearing a red-velvet robe covering her head to toe, she then gradually removes the robe revealing herself in a shiny black skin-tight latex catsuit as the song progresses.

== Video and computer games ==
Notable uses of catsuits or similar full-body garments include:

- Dead or Alive – British assassin Christie wears a black and white catsuit as her primary outfit in DOA 3, and as her second costume option in DOA 4.
- Death By Degrees – assassin and action heroine Nina Williams wears a purple leather catsuit and a black and white leather catsuit during gameplay.
- Sonic Heroes – Rouge The Bat wears a one-piece jumpsuit similar to a catsuit in the whole game.
- Soul Calibur series – female ninja Taki wears a red catsuit with body armor.
- Metroid series – Samus Aran's Zero Suit, a blue catsuit worn underneath her usual Power Suit, first appears in Metroid: Zero Mission. Samus is also playable in the Zero Suit in other games such as the Super Smash Bros. series (from Super Smash Bros. Brawl onwards).
- Tekken series – assassin and martial artist Nina Williams has worn a variety of catsuits throughout the series, including a green, brown and black military camouflage catsuit, purple military camouflage catsuits, and a shocking pink catsuit.
- Tomb Raider series – adventurer and action heroine Lara Croft has appeared in several catsuits, including a black leather catsuit and thermal spandex catsuits.
- Mass Effect 2 – Cerebus agent and possible romance option Miranda Lawson wears a white leather catsuit throughout most of the game and, after her loyalty mission, has a second black catsuit outfit option.
- Mercenaries 2: World in Flames – the catsuit is available as an outfit option for Jennifer Mui, the sole female playable character: equipping it causes her to make quips that break the fourth wall.
- Bayonetta series – The titular protagonist Bayonetta wears a catsuit that is composed of her own hair as a medium. The suit is occasionally removed when she is summoning demons to kill powerful angels.
- Persona series – In Persona 4 Arena and Ultimax, the character Mitsuru Kirijo wears a black leather catsuit which is covered by a very long white fur coat. In 5, part of Ann Takamaki's Phantom Thief outfit consists of a red catsuit that also reveals her breasts.

== Post-modern thesis ==
In a post-modern thesis on the superhero genre Michael Lecker wrote, "In the superhero genre, clothes do the talking through semiotics, which [Roland] Barthes discusses in depth in his work: The 'first, literal message serves as a support for a second meaning, of a generally affective or ideological order' (Roland Barthes). The cat suits that adorn the feline hybrid characters in this genre are firstly illustrating their connection to felines. On the ideological level, the costumes signify the attributes that our society has projected onto cats and that the characters embody." In another post-modern thesis on sadomasochism in cinema Andrea Beckmann wrote, "Cinematic SM is twisted into the non-consenting, violent realm of the unhinged that we know it is not. Fetishism is used as an excuse for a bit of titillatory semi-nudity, or to identify the villain – the man in black leather. Horror films, in particular, will happily throw in a leather catsuit or a gratuitous bondage scene to spice up a mediocre script (M Olley, Pam Hogg: Warrior Queen of the Catwalk)."
