= New York Drama Critics Award =

New York Drama Critics' Award
- Awarded for: Excellence in Broadway Theatre
- Country: United States
- Presented by: Variety
- First award: 1943

The New York Drama Critics Awards (formed 1943) are awarded through the composite opinion of a sample of New York Drama Critics to recognize Excellence in Broadway Theater. Awards are given each season for Best Performance by an Actor, Best Performance by an Actress, Best Male Performance in a Musical, Best Femme Performance in a Musical, Best Performance by an Actor in a Supporting Role, Best Performance by an Actress in a Supporting Role, Most Promising Young Actor, Most Promising Young Actress, Best Directing Job, Best Scene-Designing Job, and Best Musical Score (further specified to Composer/Lyric Writer/Librettist). An award for Best Dance Director or Choreographer was added in the 1944–1945 season. Two new categories, most promising new playwright and best new director, were added for the 1946–1947 season.

== 1942-1943 season ==
Best Performance by an Actor:	Alfred Lunt (Pirate)
Best Performance by an Actress:	Tallulah Bankhead (The Skin of Our Teeth)
Best Male Performance in a Musical:	Alfred Drake (Oklahoma!)
Best Femme Performance in a Musical:	Ethel Merman (Something for the Boys)
Best Performance by an Actor in a Supporting Role:	Rhys Williams (Harriet)
Best Performance by an Actress in a Supporting Role:	Aline MacMahon (Eve of Saint Mark)
Most Promising Young Actor:	Skippy Homeier (Tomorrow The World)
Most Promising Young Actress:	Joan Caulfield (Kiss and Tell)
Best Direction:	Elia Kazan (The Skin of Our Teeth)
Best Scene-Designing Job:	Lem Ayres (Pirate and Oklahoma!)
Best Musical Score:	Richard Rodgers (Oklahoma!)

== 1943–1944 season ==
Best Performance by an Actor:	Elliott Nugent (Voice of the Turtle)
Best Performance by an Actress:	Margaret Sullavan (Voice of the Turtle)
Best Male Performance in a Musical:	Bobby Clark (Mexican Hayride)
Best Femme Performance in a Musical:	Mary Martin (One Touch of Venus)
Best Performance by an Actor in a Supporting Role:	José Ferrer (Othello)
Best Performance by an Actress in a Supporting Role:	Terry Holmes (Manhattan Nocturne)
Most Promising Young Actor:	Montgomery Clift (Searching Wind)
Most Promising Young Actress:	Terry Holmes (Manhattan Nocturne)
Best Direction:	Moss Hart (Winged Victory)
Best Scene-Designing Job:	Stewart Chaney (Voice of the Turtle)
Best Musical Score:	Kurt Weill (One Touch of Venus)

== 1944-1945 season ==
Best Performance by an Actor:	Frank Fay (Harvey)
Best Performance by an Actress:	Laurette Taylor (The Glass Menagerie)
Best Male Performance in a Musical:	John Raitt (Carousel)
Best Femme Performance in a Musical:	Beatrice Lillie (Seven Lively Arts)
Best Performance by an Actor in a Supporting Role:	Frederick O'Neal (Anna Lucasta)
Best Performance by an Actress in a Supporting Role:	Josephine Hull (Harvey)
Most Promising Young Actor:	Richard Basehart (Hasty)
Most Promising Young Actress:	Joan Tetzel (I Remember Mama)
Best Direction:	John Van Druten (I Remember Mama)
Best Scene-Designing Job:	George Jenkins (Moon, I Remember Mama, Ground)
Best Musical Score:	Richard Rodgers and Oscar Hammerstein II (Carousel)

== 1945-1946 season ==
Best Performance by an Actor:	Laurence Olivier (Old Vic)
Best Performance by an Actress:	Betty Field (Dream Girl)
Best Male Performance in a Musical:	Ray Bolger (Three to Make Ready)
Best Femme Performance in a Musical:	Ethel Merman (Annie Get Your Gun)
Best Performance by an Actor in a Supporting Role:	Marlon Brando (Truckline Cafe)
Best Performance by an Actress in a Supporting Role:	Barbara Bel Geddes (Deep are the Roots)
Most Promising Young Actor:	Marlon Brando (Truckline Cafe)
Most Promising Young Actress:	Barbara Bel Geddes (Deep are the Roots)/Joyce Redman (Henry VII part II)/Mildred Natwick (Candida) tie
Best Direction:	Michael Gordon (Home of the Brave)/ Alfred Lunt (O Mistress Mine)/ Bretaigne Windust (State of the Union) tie
Best Dance-Director or Choreographer:	Helen Tamiris (Show Boat, Annie Get Your Gun)
Best Scene-Designing Job:	Joe Mielziner (Annie Get Your Gun, Dream Girl)/ Robert Edmond Jones (Lute Song) tie
Best Composer:	Irving Berlin (Annie Get Your Gun)
Best Lyric Writer:	Harold Rome (Call Me Mister)
Best Librettist:	Herbert and Dorothy Fields (Annie Get Your Gun)

== 1946-1947 season ==
Best Performance by an Actor:	Dudley Digges (The Iceman Cometh)/Fredric March (Years Ago) tie
Best Performance by an Actress:	Ingrid Bergman (Joan of Lorraine)
Best Male Performance in a Musical:	Bobby Clark (Sweethearts)
Best Femme Performance in a Musical:	Marion Bell (Brigadoon)
Best Performance by an Actor in a Supporting Role:	Tom Ewell (John Loves Mary)/David Wayne (Finian's Rainbow) tie
Best Performance by an Actress in a Supporting Role:	Margaret Phillips (Another Part of the Forest)
Most Promising Young Actor:	Arthur Kennedy (All my Sons)
Most Promising Young Actress:	Patricia Neal (Another Part of the Forest)
Best Direction:	John Gielgud) (The Importance of Being Earnest)/ Elia Kazan (All my Sons) tie
Best Dance-Director or Choreographer:	Agnes De Mille (Brigadoon)/Michael Kidd (Finian's Rainbow) tie
Best Scene-Designing Job:	Joe Mielziner (Another Part of the Forest)
Best Composer:	Frederick Loewe (Brigadoon)
Best Lyric Writer:	E. Y. Harburg (Finian's Rainbow)
Best Librettist:	Alan Jay Lerner (Brigadoon)
Most Promising New Playwright:	Arthur Miller (All my Sons)
Most Promising New Director:	Lillian Hellman (Another Part of the Forest)

== 1947-1948 season ==
Best Performance by an Actor:	Paul Kelly (Command Decision)
Best Performance by an Actress:	Judith Anderson (Medea)
Best Male Performance in a Musical:	Bobby Clark (Sweethearts)
Best Femme Performance in a Musical:	Beatrice Lillie (Inside U.S.A.)
Best Performance by an Actor in a Supporting Role:	Karl Malden (A Streetcar Named Desire)
Best Performance by an Actress in a Supporting Role:	Kim Hunter (A Streetcar Named Desire)
Most Promising Young Actor:	Marlon Brando (A Streetcar Named Desire)
Most Promising Young Actress:	Meg Mundy (Respectful Prostitute)
Best Direction:	Joshua Logan (Mister Roberts)
Best Dance-Director or Choreographer:	Jerome Robbins (High Button Shoes)
Best Scene-Designing Job:	Joe Mielziner (A Streetcar Named Desire)
Best Composer:	Jerome Moross (Ballads)
Best Lyric Writer:	John Latouche (Ballads)
Best Librettist:	John Latouche (Ballads)
Most Promising New Playwright:	William W. Haines (Command Decision)
Most Promising New Director:	Mary Hunter (Respectful Prostitute)
