= MUSYCA Children's Choir =

US vocal ensemble

- Origin: Los Angeles, California
- Years active: 2010–
- Website: Official Website

MUSYCA Children's Choir is a vocal ensemble located in Los Angeles, California. It was founded in 2010 by Anna Krendel and Mikhail Shtangrud. MUSYCA (pronounced MUSIC-ah) is an acronym for Musical Youth of California.

== History ==
MUSYCA is a 501(c)(3) nonprofit organization, founded by Anna Krendel and Mikhail Shtangrud in 2010. It holds several community concerts every season, typically at the end of the Fall and Spring semesters. The choir has appeared in major concert halls, performed on live TV, worked with symphony orchestras, and recorded music for film and television. It has gained recognition for its notable collaborations with film composers and popular music artists.

MUSYCA has six divisions: Kinderchoir (ages 4–6), Junior Chorus (ages 7–10), Melody Choir (ages 10–13), Harmony Ensemble (ages 13–18), Young Men’s Chorus (ages 13–18), and the Chamber Singers (SATB, ages 16–21).

The music faculty includes Dr. Anna Krendel, Dr. Mikhail Shtangrud, Grace Doyle, Vanessa Palomino, and Cheryll Desberg.

== Film soundtracks ==
2013 Black Friday Orphans: The Musical

2016 Wonders of the Sea 3D

2017 Valerian and the City of a Thousand Planets

2017 Enchanted Christmas

2018 Boy Erased

== Television shows ==
2014 Nickelodeon Kids’ Choice Awards

2015 Entourage-a-thon (Funny or Die)

2015 Home and Family Show (Hallmark Channel)

2017 Fresh off the Boat (S4 E9: Side Effect)

2018 The Voice (NBC) (S15 E23)

2019 The OA (Netflix) (S2 E4: SYZYGY)

2019 The Wonderful World of Disney: Magical Holiday Celebration (ABC)

2019 Disney Parks Magical Christmas Day Parade (ABC)

2020 Super Bowl LIV Halftime Show (Fox)

2026 Live From Roku City Celebrates Wicked: For Good

== Sound recordings ==
2015 “Kingdom Come” and “Friends” from All We Need by Raury

2016 “Heroes Inside” from Beyond by Multiverse

2016 “Family of God” from Love Riot by Newsboys

2016 “A Billion Souls” and “Drag Me Along” by Alpine Universe

2016 “Mr. Man” from Sincerely by Stephen

2016 “Today” from Atrocity Exhibition by Danny Brown

2017 “Be Easy” from To Dream by Timeflies

2018 “Easy” from Ella Mai by Ella Mai. Produced by DJ Mustard

2018 “These Are the Magic Days” by Princess Superstar (feat. Musyca Children's Choir)

2018 “Scary World" from Scary World by Night Club

2018 “C U When U Get There” by Alberto Ciccarini

2018 “Better Demons” and “Leech” from Generation Rx by Good Charlotte

2018 “Scary World“ from Scary World by Night Club

2019 “Rave Teacher” by Scooter and Xillions

2019 “Up All Night” by Yung Bae, feat. Paper Idol

2019 “Things Fall Apart” by Ayokay

2019 "Blessings" by Slick Naim (feat. MUSYCA)

2020 "It's Hard To Be Human" by Lawrence Rothman

2020 Hollywood Park by The Airborne Toxic Event

2020 Workshop Jams by Build-A-Bear Kids

2021 Donda by Kanye West

2023 "Hoboken" by Franklin Jonas

2026 “Miss This Christmas” by Olivia Rodrigo

== Performance tours ==
2015 France (Notre-Dame de Paris)

2018 Australia and New Zealand

2019 Japan and Singapore

2020 Spain
