= Colin Harrison (writer) =

American novelist and editor (born 1960)

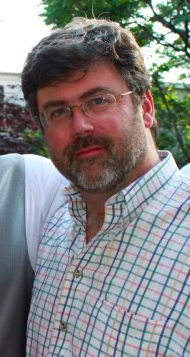
- Born: 1960 (age 65–66); New York City, U.S.
- Education: University of Iowa (MFA); Haverford College (BA)
- Occupations: Novelist, editor
- Years active: 1989–present
- Employer: Scribner
- Notable work: Manhattan Nocturne
- Spouse: Kathryn Harrison
- Children: 3

Colin Harrison (born 1960 in New York City) is an American novelist and editor.

== Early life ==
Harrison attended the University of Iowa Writers' Workshop (MFA, 1986), and studied for one year in the university's American Studies doctoral program before moving to New York. He is also a graduate of Haverford College (BA, 1982), and Westtown School (1978), a coeducational Quaker boarding school, where his father, Earl Harrison Jr., was headmaster.

== Career ==
=== As a writer ===
Harrison is the author of eight novels: Break and Enter (1990), Bodies Electric (1993), Manhattan Nocturne (1996), Afterburn (2000), The Havana Room (2004), The Finder (2008), Risk (2009), which was first published as a fifteen-part serial in The New York Times magazine in 2008, and You Belong to Me, published in June 2017.

His books have been published in a dozen countries and four have been selected as Notable Books by The New York Times Book Review. The Finder was a finalist for the 2009 Los Angeles Times Book Prize and the 2009 Dashiell Hammett Award.

His short nonfiction has appeared in The New York Times, New York Magazine, The Washington Post, the Chicago Tribune, Vogue, Salon, Worth, and other publications and anthologies, including Brooklyn Was Mine.

=== As an editor ===
He was an editor at Harper's Magazine from 1989 until 2001. In 2001 he was appointed senior editor at Scribner, an imprint of Simon & Schuster, where he edits both fiction and non-fiction. In 2013, he became Scribner's editor-in-chief and held that position until 2025, then becoming the imprint's editorial director.

== Adaptation ==
A movie version of Manhattan Nocturne, directed and written by Brian DeCubellis and titled Manhattan Night, was released by Lionsgate in May 2016. The movie stars Adrien Brody, Yvonne Strahovski, Campbell Scott, Jennifer Beals, and others.

== Personal life ==
He has lived since 1987 in the Park Slope neighborhood of Brooklyn and in recent years increasingly on the North Fork of Long Island where for twenty-five years he has maintained a private pear orchard. He has 3 children with his wife, writer Kathryn Harrison.
