= Manhattan Night =

- Theatrical release poster
- Directed by: Brian DeCubellis
- Written by: Brian DeCubellis
- Based on: Manhattan Nocturne by Colin Harrison
- Produced by: Adrien Brody; Brian DeCubellis; Steven Klinsky
- Starring: Adrien Brody; Yvonne Strahovski; Jennifer Beals; Campbell Scott; Linda Lavin; Steven Berkoff
- Cinematography: David Tumblety
- Edited by: Andy Keir
- Music by: Joel Douek
- Production companies: DeCubellis Films; Untravelled Worlds; Fable House; Nocturne Pictures; Big Indie Pictures
- Distributed by: Lionsgate Premiere
- Release date: May 20, 2016
- Running time: 113 minutes
- Country: United States
- Language: English

Manhattan Night is a 2016 American crime thriller film written and directed by Brian DeCubellis. It is based on the 1996 novel Manhattan Nocturne by Colin Harrison. The film stars Adrien Brody, Yvonne Strahovski, Jennifer Beals and Campbell Scott. The film was released on May 20, 2016, by Lionsgate Premiere.

== Plot ==
The story is narrated in first person by Porter Wren, a columnist and crime reporter for a New York City newspaper with a reputation as a good listener. One night, he attends an after work party hosted by publishing magnate Hobbs, who has just purchased the newspaper. Porter is approached by socialite Caroline Crowley, whom Porter recognizes from headlines regarding the death of her husband, Simon. Simon was a successful movie producer obsessed with capturing authentic life, often disappearing at night to film random things. His body was discovered in the rubble of a demolished building. No one could figure out how the body got there, as the site was fenced off and locked up.

Caroline invites Porter to her apartment where she shows him confidential police reports related to Simon's still-unsolved death. She asks Porter to investigate and, over a series of meetings, gradually seduces him. Porter, whose relationship with his wife Lisa and children has become stale, soon gives in.

Going through Simon's belongings, Porter forms an image of him as an eccentric and controlling man. He filmed his own life almost obsessively, sometimes with hidden cameras, and subjected Caroline to cruel pranks and mind games for the sake of capturing authentic reactions. She has a vault filled with thousands of memory cards containing footage of these incidents. None of it, however, gives Porter any insights into his death.

Hobbs learns of Porter's affair with Caroline, and forces him into an investigation on Hobbs' behalf by making threats against Porter's family. Hobbs is looking for a particular memory card he believes Caroline is using to blackmail him. When Porter questions her, Caroline admits she is also looking for the memory card. Simon, after beating her in a drinking game, dared her to have sex with a stranger and record the encounter with a hidden camera. She randomly crossed paths with Hobbs and decided to sleep with him. When Simon watched the video, something about it infuriated him and he hid the memory card; after his death, Hobbs began threatening her. Porter, forcing Caroline to admit she only seduced him to enlist his help, leaves in disgust. Outside his house, he is accosted by thugs working for Hobbs, who beat him up and promise to do worse until he finds the video.

Porter goes to see Simon's father, who is in a nursing home, but he is unresponsive. Porter discovers a video camera in a bedside table, but the memory card in it only has footage of Simon visiting his father. Meanwhile, Hobbs' men force their way into Porter's house and accidentally shoot and wound his son, causing a distraught Lisa to take the children and walk out on Porter. After attacking Hobbs' lawyer in revenge, Porter watches the nursing home video again and realizes Simon's father had regular visits from a lady named Mrs. Segal. He breaks into her house and finds financial records indicating that she has been billing Simon’s estate for the visits to Simon’s father but also for unknown services at $5000 per month. Before he can find the memory card, Mrs. Segal returns to find him there. After explaining himself, he learns that she is a friend of Simon's family, who became a surrogate mother to Simon after his own mother died when he was a child. Wanting to repay her kindness, he arranged a monthly allowance for her once he became rich. Mrs. Segal felt obligated to earn the money, and became a caretaker of sorts to Simon's father. Questioned by Porter about the charges to the estate, Mrs. Segal reveals she was asked by Simon before his death to send copies of a memory card to Hobbs every month. Never having seen what is on it, she gives her last remaining copy of the card to Porter. Watching it, he sees that Hobbs and Caroline had a long and intensely personal conversation before they had sex.

Porter returns the video to Hobbs, ending the threat against him and his family. In a show of good faith, Hobbs gives him a key his men found when searching Caroline's apartment for the video. Porter figures out the key is for the basement lock of the building where Simon was found. He goes there and discovers another hidden camera. The memory card in this one reveals Simon took Caroline to the building the night he died. Having watched the sex tape, he demands to know a dark secret about her stepfather that she revealed to Hobbs. Porter watches as Simon's violent interrogation of Caroline leads to his death.

The next morning, Porter meets Caroline and reveals the recording. He gives her a copy, with the original as insurance against her contacting his family (something she had previously done for her own enjoyment). She in turn reveals the secret she told to Hobbs but kept from Simon. Porter wishes her well and leaves.

In voiceover, Porter expresses guilt for all that happened, including his divorce, while admitting that the experience has both corrupted him and revealed an inner darkness that was always there. In the final scene, Porter drives by the house of a now-remarried Caroline and they look at each other one last time.

== Cast ==
- Adrien Brody as Porter Wren
- Yvonne Strahovski as Caroline Crowley
- Jennifer Beals as Lisa Wren
- Campbell Scott as Simon Crowley
- Linda Lavin as Norma Segal
- Steven Berkoff as Hobbs
- Kevin Breznahan as Ron
- Thomas Bair as Tommy

== Production ==
On January 29, 2014, Adrien Brody and Yvonne Strahovski joined the cast of the film.

== Release ==
The film was released on May 20, 2016, by Lionsgate Premiere.

=== Critical response ===
On review aggregator website Rotten Tomatoes, Manhattan Night has an approval rating of 36%, based on 22 reviews, with an average rating of 4.88/10. On Metacritic, the film has a score of 44 out of 100, based on 14 critics, indicating "mixed or average reviews".
