= Kathryn Harrison =

American author (born 1961)

- Born: March 20, 1961 (age 65); Los Angeles, California, U.S.
- Education: Stanford University (BA); University of Iowa (MFA)
- Occupation: Author
- Spouse: Colin Harrison
- Writing career
- Notable work: The Kiss (1997)
- Website: kathrynharrison.com

Kathryn Harrison (born March 20, 1961, in Los Angeles, California) is an American author. She has published seven novels, two memoirs, two collections of personal essays, a travelogue, two biographies, and a book of true crime. She reviews regularly for The New York Times Book Review. Her personal essays have been included in many anthologies and have appeared in Bookforum, Harper's Magazine, More Magazine, The New Yorker, O, The Oprah Magazine, and Vogue, Salon, and Nerve.

== Background and education ==
Harrison's maternal grandparents raised her in Los Angeles, California, after her teenage parents separated when she was a baby. She graduated from Stanford University in 1982 with a Bachelor of Arts degree in English and Art History; she received a Master of Fine Arts degree from the University of Iowa in 1987 after attending that school's Writers' Workshop.

Harrison emailed interviewer Robert Birnbaum: “My grandmother, the one who raised me, grew up in Shanghai. Her father’s name was Solomon Benjamin Sassoon, but he was too proud to use the name Sassoon to open doors for him, so he reversed the names and went as Solomon Sassoon Benjamin. He was born in Baghdad—one of the many descendants of Sheik David Sassoon — went from there to Bombay/Mumbai, and on to Hong Kong and then Shanghai. He had a small brokerage and made and lost and made again a small fortune, which paid for my education, among other things, before it was entirely frittered away.”

== Career ==
Harrison's debut novel, Thicker than Water (1992), was critically lauded by The New York Times Newsday and The Boston Globe. Publishers Weekly wrote: "Impressively in control of her material, she will be heralded as a promising new writer." Kirkus Reviews concluded: "A promising debut, distinguished in particular by the strength of its mesmerizing voice."

Exposure, published the following year, was similarly praised. Donna Tartt called the novel “Exquisite, exhilarating, and harrowing.”

Harrison's memoir The Kiss documented a love triangle that developed involving her young mother, her father, and herself. It described her father's seduction of her when she was twenty and their incestuous involvement, which persisted for four years and is reflected in the plots and themes of her first three novels, published before The Kiss. In The New York Times Book Review, Susan Cheever wrote, "The story of an intellectually powerful man and his consuming desire to ravish an innocent, almost preconscious, young woman (sometimes his daughter) has often been told—Zeus, Lewis Carroll and Humbert Humbert come to mind—but Kathryn Harrison turns up the volume, making this ancient immorality tale a struggle between good and evil, between life and death, between God and the Devil." In The New York Times critic Christopher Lehmann-Haupt called the memoir "appalling but beautifully written."

In The New Republic, by contrast, James Wolcott strongly criticized the work. He called it "the oddest piece of kitsch" with "airbrushed" sentences that "leave wistful little vapor trails of Valium." He pointed out that at the time of the affair, Harrison was not an innocent child victim but rather a consenting adult. He asked, "Did she call him 'Dad' in bed?" Wolcott dismissed much of the book's prose as "bad Sylvia Plath." Writing in The Washington Post, Jonathan Yardley called The Kiss "slimy, repellent, meretricious, cynical." Stephanie Zacherek of Salon called it "colorless," "arid," "boring" and "numbing." In The New York Times, Maureen Dowd wrote that the book constituted an example of "creepy people talking about creepy people." In Slate, Alex Beam called the book "a memoir of French-licking her father." After Michael Shnayerson published a critical account of the book in Vanity Fair, The New Yorker canceled an excerpt that it had scheduled.

In The Art of Memoir, Mary Karr dedicated a chapter, "The Public and Private Burning of Kathryn Harrison" to discussing The Kiss controversy. She suggests that the outrage was motivated by Harrison's gender.

While much of her body of work—the essays collected in Seeking Rapture: Scenes From a Life and in True Crimes: A Family Album; a second memoir, The Mother Knot; and The Kiss—documents her tortured relationship with her mother, who died in 1985, Harrison also has written extensively of her maternal grandparents, both in her personal essays and, in fictionalized form, in her novels. Her grandmother, of the Sephardi Sassoon family, was raised in Shanghai, where she lived until 1920, her experiences there inspiring Harrison's historical novel, The Binding Chair. The Seal Wife, set in Alaska during World War I, draws on the early life of her British grandfather, who spent his youth trapping animals to obtain their fur in the Northwest Territories and laying track into Anchorage for the Alaska Railroad.

Of her most recent book, True Crimes: A Family Album, The New York Times Book Review said, "These intimate essays, which probe the deepest parts of Harrison's psyche, wield a curious power."

== Personal life ==
She lives in New York with her husband, the novelist and book editor Colin Harrison, whom she met in 1985, when they were enrolled in the Iowa Writers' Workshop. They have three children.

== Teaching ==
Harrison teaches memoir writing at the City University of New York's Hunter College as part of the Master of Fine Arts Program in Creative Writing.

== Works ==
Fiction:

- Thicker Than Water (Random House, 1992)
- Exposure (Random House, 1993)
- A Thousand Orange Trees (Harper Collins, 1995)
- Poison (Random House, 1995)
- The Binding Chair (Random House, 2000)
- The Seal Wife (Random House, 2002)
- Envy (Random House, 2005)
- Enchantments (Random House, 2012)

Nonfiction:

- The Kiss: A Memoir (Random House, 1997)
- Seeking Rapture: Scenes From a Life (Random House, 2003)
- The Road to Santiago (National Geographic, 2003)
- Saint Therese of Lisieux: Penguin Lives Series (Penguin Books, 2003)
- The Mother Knot: A Memoir (Random House, 2004)
- While They Slept: An Inquiry into the Murder of a Family (Random House, 2008)
- Joan of Arc: A Life Transfigured (Doubleday, 2014)
- True Crimes: A Family Album (Random House 2016)
- On Sunset (Random House 2018) ISBN 9780385542678
