= Tiny Fuppets =

Animated Portuguese-language web cartoon

Tiny Fuppets is a 2009 animated Portuguese-language cartoon web series created by Scott Gairdner. The show is a parody of Jim Henson's Muppet Babies, and relies on irony and surrealism, as well as purposeful mistranslations for its humour. The show has been named "Most Bizarre Knockoff Ever" by The Huffington Post.

== Characters ==
- Kormit – The apparent leader of the tiny fuppets. He generally gets along fine with the rest of the fuppets but can sometimes be hostile and is somewhat abrasive overall. His greatest wish is to be approximately three feet tall. He seems to have somewhat of a relationship with Ms. Woman, as cemented in the episode "Party Pals". He resembles Kermit the Frog.
- Ms. Woman – The character that Kormit is in a "relationship" with. She is not very smart or headstrong, and usually just supports other characters. She resembles Miss Piggy.
- Gonzor – The least characteristic of the fuppets, he doesn't play much of a role. He resembles Gonzo.
- Tummi – Tummi plays the "unsung hero" character in the Halloween and Christmas episodes but doesn't talk at all and is often neglected by the other fuppets. He resembles Fozzie Bear.
- Animanuel – Animanuel only occasionally speaks and doesn't often make sense or play a part in the story. He resembles Animal.
