= Podcast: The Ride =

Podcast about theme parks

- Genre: Comedy
- Language: English

Cast and voices
- Hosted by: Scott Gairdner, Michael Carlson, Jason Sheridan

Production
- Length: 90-200 minutes

Publication
- Updates: Weekly

Related
- Website: https://foreverdogpodcasts.com/podcasts/podcast-the-ride/

Podcast: The Ride is an audio podcast hosted by Scott Gairdner, Mike Carlson, and Jason Sheridan, in which they discuss theme parks and themed entertainment. The podcast launched in October 2017 and is produced by the Forever Dog Podcast Network. In 2018 the show launched a Patreon called Second Gate.

== Reception ==
Podcast: The Ride has been listed as a top recommendation from Wired, GQ, Uproxx, Paste, and Vulture.

AV Club praised the podcast, stating that "the crew has dissected everything from entire defunct theme parks across the country to the inexplicably resilient “Waterworld” stunt show to the Tangled-themed bathrooms at Disney’s Magic Kingdom. In all cases, their enthusiasm is unwavering, and their dogged pursuit of the truth turns up more delightful discoveries than a family vacation ever could."

Chicago Reader highlighted the show as an example of the rise of bingeable podcasts.

Beyond the show itself, the creators have also been invited to comment on major news in the world of themed entertainment such as the opening of Casa Bonita in Denver and the enduring legacy of Jaws: The Ride. They have also been recognized for other efforts, such as the original song Jump, Jump Payakan, which concept artist Constantine Sekeris used to highlight the popularity of the creature following the release of Avatar: The Way of Water.
