= Requiem for Romance =

Studio album by Night Club
- Released: October 9, 2016
- Recorded: 2016
- Length: 29:01
- Label: Gato Blanco
- Producer: The 3 Kord Scissor King

Night Club chronology
Moonbeam City Official Soundtrack (2015)	Requiem for Romance (2016)	Scary World (2018)

Singles from Night Club
- 1. "Bad Girl" Released: September 8, 2016; 2. "Dear Enemy" Released: December 20, 2016; 3. "Show It 2 Me" Released: January 19, 2017

Requiem for Romance is the debut studio album by American electronic band Night Club. It was released on October 9, 2016, by Gato Blanco Records. The album's production was handled by Mark Brooks (a.k.a. 3 Kord Scissor King).

== Track listing ==
All lyrics are written by Emily Kavanaugh and Mark Brooks.

Requiem for Romance track listing
No.	Title	Length
1.	"Requiem"	1:38
2.	"Bad Girl"	2:57
3.	"Show It 2 Me"	4:08
4.	"Dear Enemy"	3:40
5.	"Psychosuperlover"	2:47
6.	"Freak Like Me"	3:04
7.	"Magnetic"	2:42
8.	"Dangerous Heart"	3:42
9.	"Pray"	3:22
10.	"Little Token"	2:29
Total length:		29:01
