= The Kiss (memoir) =

1997 memoir by Kathryn Harrison

- Author: Kathryn Harrison
- Language: English
- Genre: Memoir
- Published: 1997
- Publication place: USA

The Kiss is a memoir by American author Kathryn Harrison. First published in 1997, the memoir details her relationship with her estranged father, which culminated in a sexual affair when they finally met again when she was an adult.

Harrison made efforts to disguise her father's identity but nevertheless faced criticism for publishing the book while her father was alive.

== Summary ==
Harrison is a product of the short marriage between her parents, who met when they were both seventeen. Quickly marrying and having a child, they divorced due to pressure from Harrison's maternal grandparents, who convinced her mother to leave her father as he was incapable of financially supporting her and the child. They convinced Harrison's father to limit contact with both mother and child as they promised they would not come after him for child support.

Harrison's mother is extremely distant with her and moves out of her family home, abandoning Harrison to be raised by her maternal grandparents when she is 5. Harrison sees her father twice during her childhood, once when she is 5 and a second time when she is 10. Despite the fact that her father remarries and has children with his new wife and her mother has relationships with other men, Harrison suspects they continue to have an infrequent sexual affair during this time.

When Harrison is 20, she meets her father for the first time as an adult. The two are immediately attracted to one another and cannot stop staring at one another. When she drops her father off at the airport, he gives her a kiss on the mouth which quickly turns sexual. After the kiss, Harrison is disturbed and drops out of school. She tells herself that the kiss was chaste in nature. She and her father begin obsessively calling each other, planning to meet again.

Harrison's father becomes increasingly controlling of her and demands that they have sex as a means of expressing their love for one another. While Harrison repeatedly resists, she eventually acquiesces although she begins to black out as a means of coping with the sex. Harrison's mother and grandparents suspect that she is having sex with her father but she denies it.

Eventually, as Harrison has no job and no means of supporting herself, she goes to live with her father, his wife and their children. Her father continues having sex with her during this time and Harrison begins self-harming and contemplates suicide.

Harrison's maternal grandfather and mother both become sick at the same time. When her grandfather dies, Harrison goes to the hospital morgue to see his corpse. She gives him a final kiss on the cheek which she credits with helping to break her father's control over her. Her mother also dies of breast cancer and Harrison cuts off her long hair and gives it to her mother as a gesture of goodwill. Harrison finally leaves for graduate school. Before she goes she asks her father if they can try being a normal father and daughter and he refuses. She cuts off all contact with him.

In 1995, Harrison has a dream that her mother visits her and they are finally able to make peace with one another.

== Reception ==
The memoir received mixed reviews. The New York Times considered it "a powerful piece of writing, a testament to evil and hope."

The events in The Kiss are reflected in the plots and themes of her first three novels, published before The Kiss. In The New York Times Book Review, Susan Cheever wrote, "The story of an intellectually powerful man and his consuming desire to ravish an innocent, almost preconscious, young woman (sometimes his daughter) has often been told—Zeus, Lewis Carroll and Humbert Humbert come to mind—but Kathryn Harrison turns up the volume, making this ancient immorality tale a struggle between good and evil, between life and death, between God and the Devil." In The New York Times critic Christopher Lehmann-Haupt called the memoir "appalling but beautifully written."

In The New Republic, by contrast, James Wolcott strongly criticized the work. He called it "the oddest piece of kitsch" with "airbrushed" sentences that "leave wistful little vapor trails of Valium." He pointed out that at the time of the affair, Harrison was not an innocent child victim but rather a consenting adult. He asked, "Did she call him 'Dad' in bed?" Wolcott dismissed much of the book's prose as "bad Sylvia Plath." Writing in The Washington Post, Jonathan Yardley called The Kiss "slimy, repellent, meretricious, cynical." Stephanie Zacherek of Salon called it "colorless," "arid," "boring" and "numbing." In The New York Times, Maureen Dowd wrote that the book constituted an example of "creepy people talking about creepy people." In Slate, Alex Beam called the book "a memoir of French-licking her father." After Michael Shnayerson published a critical account of the book in Vanity Fair, The New Yorker canceled an excerpt that it had scheduled.

In The Art of Memoir, Mary Karr dedicated a chapter, "The Public and Private Burning of Kathryn Harrison" to discussing The Kiss controversy. She suggests that the outrage was motivated by Harrison's gender.
