= Moonbeam City =

2015–2016 American animated TV series by Scott Gairdner

- Genre: Comedy; Adult animation Mystery; Science fiction
- Created by: Scott Gairdner
- Directed by: Mark Brooks; Juno Lee
- Voices of: Rob Lowe; Elizabeth Banks; Kate Mara; Will Forte
- Theme music composer: Night Club
- Opening theme: "Another One" (Instrumental)
- Composer: Night Club
- Country of origin: United States
- Original language: English
- No. of seasons: 1
- No. of episodes: 10

Production
- Executive producers: Scott Gairdner; Will Gluck; Richard Schwartz; Tommy Blacha
- Producers: Rob Lowe; James Merrill
- Editors: Barry Kelly; Jeff Picarello
- Running time: 22 minutes
- Production companies: Olive Bridge Entertainment; Alphapanel Industries; Solis Animation; Titmouse, Inc.

Original release
- Network: Comedy Central
- Release: September 16 – December 9, 2015

Moonbeam City is an American adult animated sitcom created by Scott Gairdner starring the voices of Elizabeth Banks, Rob Lowe, Kate Mara and Will Forte. It premiered on Comedy Central on September 16, 2015. On March 30, 2016, the series was cancelled after one season.

== Characters ==
=== Main Characters ===
- Dazzle Novak (Rob Lowe): Protagonist and Moonbeam City P.D. detective, despite being especially unqualified for the job due to poor impulse control, horrendous reasoning skills, ridiculous libido, and ego, and (often) even worse aim. He gets sidetracked from assignments to tend to anything he finds far superior. Any success is normally due to luck or the assistance of others (usually his junior partner, Chrysalis). Has an odd talent for invention and design, and is the son of stuntman Razzle Novak. Dazzle's mother died from cancer when he was a child. He has personal animosity towards Rad in his attempts to outdo him as a cop, even embarrassing him on a personal level.
- Pizzaz Miller (Elizabeth Banks): Police chief, and Dazzle's irascible supervisor. Though she is sometimes at odds with Dazzle due to his shoddy police work and defiance of authority, she fails to harshly discipline him for even the most severe infractions due to an intense mutual attraction and affection between the two. It is later learned that Pizzaz is an heiress (and eventual sole inheritor) to Moonbeam City's founder, laser prospecting mega-millionaire, Vector Azimuth Miller. Pizzaz also has four abusive and conniving sisters: Charisma, Panache, Sophistica, and Accoutrement. When passionate or angry, Pizzaz narrows her eyes and a slanted window blind-like shadow appears over her face and body, regardless of the location and ambient lighting.
- Chrysalis Zirconia Tate (Kate Mara): Dazzle's rookie colleague. A former lab tech, Chrysalis is the polar opposite of Dazzle (competent, level-headed, responsible), and often the unintentional victim of his irresponsibility and poor impulse control. Chrysalis' job usually entails the detective work and technical aspects of the job, and she is often blamed by Pizzaz for Dazzle and Rad's inept behavior. Chrysalis is the daughter of eccentric Naval Commander Blade H. Tate.
- Radward "Rad" Cunningham (Will Forte): Dazzle's equally incompetent, yet even stupider childish rival/teammate from Canada in the Moonbeam PD. He fears authority more than Dazzle, and is prone to even greater lapses of judgment, usually when trying to outdo or outsmart Dazzle. While initially seeming fierce and threatening in the Pilot episode, Rad is eventually shown to be incredibly cowardly and immature, though not without moments of unexpected (and ill-timed) bravery. The series finale reveals (through Chrysalis' detective work) that Rad is the biological son of the billionaire computer founders of Canadian computer company Flamingo Computers, but was kidnapped as a toddler by the con artist couple who raised him (he later changes his name to "Radward Manning" to distance himself from them). He has a unique condition called "Mono-Toeism" which causes his right foot to have only one giant toe. He is shown to be very poor as well as perverted.

=== Recurring Characters ===
- Genesis Jones (Scott Gairdner): News anchor who appears in every episode. He often acts as more of a shameless announcer or sensationalist rather than a real journalist.
- Vex Mullery (John O'Hurley): The host of CrimeZappers, a crime reenactment TV show that the Moonbeam officers gather to watch weekly. He also appears in a later episode as the host of an initiation video at CopCon.

== Production ==
A parody of 1980s cop shows such as Miami Vice and City Hunter, the show was sponsored by the Canadian government and animated by Toronto-based studio Solis Animation using Adobe After Effects software. Moonbeam City features a distinctive 80s-influenced retro-futuristic visual style with heavy use of neon lighting, inspired by media such as Tron; character designs are similar to the style of the artist Patrick Nagel who famously designed the cover for Duran Duran's Rio. A synthwave soundtrack was performed by Night Club.

== Episodes ==
No.	Title	Directed by	Written by	Original release date	Prod. code	US viewers (millions)
1	"Mall Hath No Fury"	Mark Brooks	Scott Gairdner	September 16, 2015	101	0.61
An incompetent police detective named Dazzle Novak promotes a shopping mall singing sensation, while a petty thief Dazzle let slip through his fingers creates a cocaine empire and proceeds to overrun Moonbeam City, a crime-ridden beach city based on Miami in the 1980s. Guest starring Nick Corirossi and Cree Summer.
2	"Lights! Camera! Re-enaction!"	Mark Brooks	Ryan Perez	September 23, 2015	104	0.52
While DJing for a mandatory month underage rave, Dazzle becomes famous for stopping a juvenile bike thief and creates an over-the-top re-enactment segment for Crimezappers, Moonbeam City's premier crime show. Guest starring John O'Hurley and Allison Janney.
3	"The Strike Visualizer Strikes Again"	Juno Lee	Tommy Blacha	September 30, 2015	105	N/A
Dazzle, Chrysalis, and Rad track down the murderous "Moonbeam Maniac", while Dazzle confronts a childhood hero. Guest voices include Peter Serafinowicz and Cree Summer.
4	"Quest for Aquatica"	Mark Brooks	Scott Gairdner	October 14, 2015	102	0.53
Dazzle is tasked by Chrysalis' father with finding a missing dolphin, but falls in love with one named "Splasha". Guest starring Patrick Warburton.
5	"Glitzotrene: One Town’s Seduction"	Juno Lee	Andrew Weinberg	October 21, 2015	107	N/A
To prevent Mayor Eo Jaxxon from dismantling Moonbeam City's police department, the police hook the entire city on the synthetic drug "Glitzotrene", creating a drug epidemic. Guest starring Powers Boothe, Trace Adkins, and Carlos Alazraqui.
6	"Lasers and Liars"	Juno Lee	Andrew Weinberg	October 28, 2015	103	N/A
When the team gears up for the Laser Ball, Dazzle and Pizzaz become entangled with her hyper-wealthy (and despicable) family, while Rad's lies become increasingly ridiculous while trying to join a yacht club. Guest starring Kate McKinnon, Paget Brewster, and Kevin McDonald.
7	"Cop Con"	Mark Brooks	Ryan Perez	November 11, 2015	106	N/A
At the 3-day "Cop Con" event, Dazzle and Pizzaz enjoy their annual passionate tryst. Meanwhile, Chrysalis avoids an obsessed fan, a frustrated Rad starts "Rad Con", and a cop-free Moonbeam City undergoes a community renaissance. Guest starring John O'Hurley, Allison Janney, Cree Summer, and Nick Corirossi.
8	"Stuntstravaganza"	Mark Brooks	Scott Gairdner	November 18, 2015	108	N/A
Bitter in defeat from a racing challenge, Dazzle seeks out his estranged father to help him perfect a car stunt. Meanwhile, Rad faces the consequences of misplacing his parking validation card. Guest starring Adam West, Paul F. Tompkins, and Nick Mundy.
9	"The Legend Of Circuit Lake"	Juno Lee	Tommy Blacha & Ryan Perez	December 2, 2015	109	N/A
To get revenge, Rad attempts to dig up embarrassing footage of Dazzle from the police records room. But things go awry, rendering Rad trapped in its virtual reality computer system. Dazzle ends up being accused and convicted of Rad's presumed murder, gets sent to prison, and ends up having relations with its computerized artificially intelligent security system. Guest starring Tom Kenny, Susan Sarandon, and Molly Shannon.
10	"The Wedding of Rad (Lie)"	Mark Brooks	Scott Gairdner	December 9, 2015	110	N/A
In the series finale, Dazzle hooks up with the daughter of a crime lord. Meanwhile, Rad's family coerces him into a bizarre arranged marriage to con the entire Moonbeam City police department. Guest starring Kate McKinnon, Catherine O'Hara, and Andy Richter.

== Broadcast ==
Internationally, the series premiered in Australia on November 15, 2015, on The Comedy Channel.

== Reception ==
On December 1, 2015, Moonbeam City was nominated for an Annie Award for Best General Audience Animated TV/Broadcast Production, but lost to The Simpsons.

The first season holds a 29% on Rotten Tomatoes based on 14 reviews. Its consensus states: "Moonbeam City wildly overestimates the effectiveness of its attempts at over-the-top humor, leaving viewers with little more than a derivative disappointment". On Metacritic, the series holds a 52% indicating mixed or average reviews.

Mike Hale of The New York Times stated that "The look of 'Moonbeam City' may catch your eye, but after a while, you may be tempted to say, along with Ms. Banks, 'I will bury you so deep the world’s smartest worms couldn’t find you'". He also stated that the pop-culture references and satire were forced and the dialogue "tries so hard you can see it sweat". Daniel Fienberg of The Hollywood Reporter claimed that the show would be able to stand "in a world without Archer" and called it thin and with limited potential. Bob Sassone of The A.V. Club gave it a C+, calling it "more clever than funny with Archer vibes". Brian Lowry of Variety claims that the show settles more for being puerile than clever, making it "less than dazzling". Katy Waldman of Slate's review was scathing, stating that the series "is so willfully dumb that it might make you wonder if it is meta-dumb".
