= Courtenay Taylor =

American actress

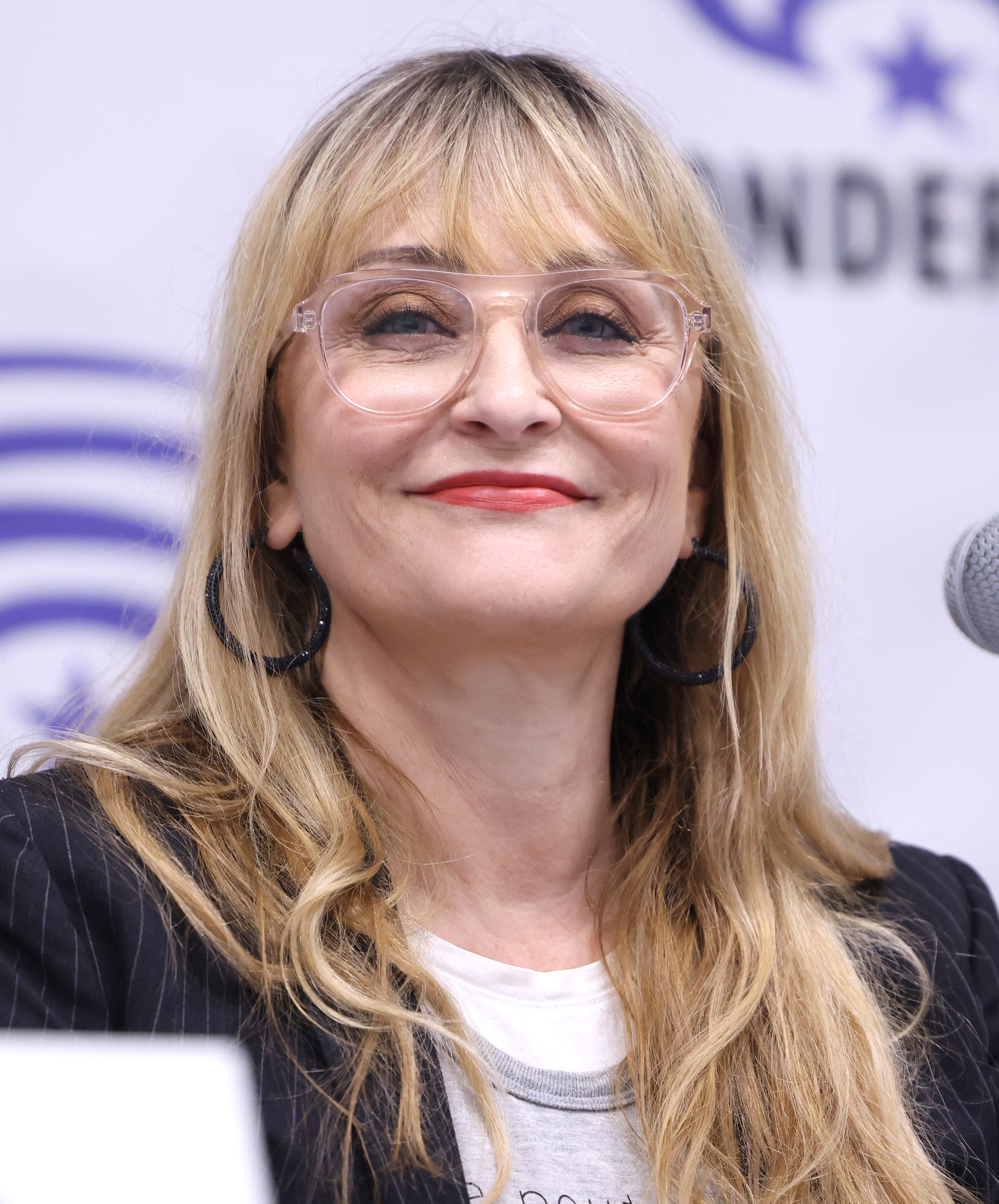
- Taylor in 2026
- Born: San Francisco, California, U.S.
- Occupation: Actress
- Years active: 1993–present

Courtenay Taylor is an American actress. She is best known for her video game voice roles as Jack in the Mass Effect series, Ada Wong in the Resident Evil series, the female sole Survivor in Fallout 4, Amanda Holliday and Empress Caiatl in Destiny and Destiny 2, and Scarlett Rhodes in Call of Duty: Black Ops 4. She is also known as the voice of Starla in the Cartoon Network animated sitcom, Regular Show and K.O. in OK K.O.! Let's Be Heroes.

== Career ==
Taylor has been named as one of the most prolific voice actors in the gaming industry, having been working in the genre since 2002 with American Idol. In 2010, she voiced Gloria Van Graff, Janet, Jas Wilkins, Morgan Blake, and other additional characters in Fallout: New Vegas. In 2015, she returned to the Fallout series to voice the female Sole Survivor in Fallout 4. As of 2017, she has worked on 83 separate titles in numerous franchises.

== Personal life ==
Taylor revealed in 2017 that she had suffered from a vocal cord hemorrhage after working on a game during a speech that included whispering, and was unable to work for three months afterwards.

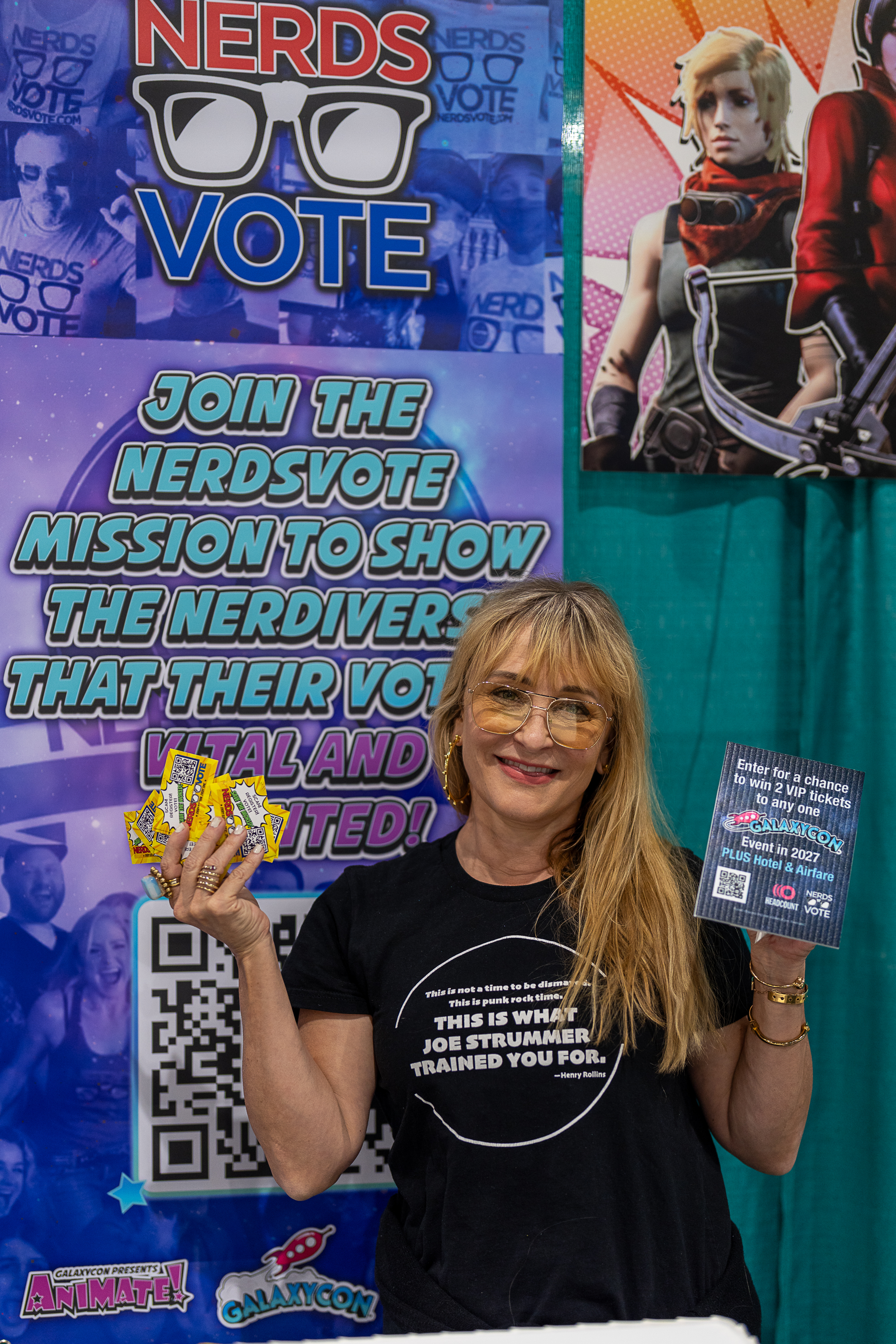
Taylor showing off NerdsVote swag

Taylor co-runs NerdsVote alongside JP Karliak. NerdsVote is a non-partisan organization dedicated to voter engagement within fandom spaces.

== Filmography ==
=== Voice over roles ===
==== Film ====
Year	Title	Role	Notes
2012	Resident Evil: Damnation	Ada Wong	English dub
2019	Wonder Woman: Bloodlines	Doctor Poison	Direct-to-video
2022	Mortal Kombat Legends: Snow Blind	Kira	Direct-to-video
2023	Merry Little Batman	Kid Shopper, Worried Woman	Direct-to-Streaming
2024	The Imaginary	Cruncher-of-Bones	English dub

==== Television ====
Year	Title	Role	Notes
2008	Avatar: The Last Airbender	Guard	2 episodes
2011–2016	Regular Show	Starla, Audrey, Additional Voices	45 episodes
2012	Oishi High School Battle	Dakota's Mom	Episode: "Sleepover"
2016	2 Broke Girls	Death Bitch	Episode: "And the Booth Babes"
2016	Skylanders Academy	Hex	7 episodes
2017–2019	OK K.O.! Let's Be Heroes	K.O., T.K.O., Blue Power, Whistle, Baby Shannon, Hon Dew, Slime	75 episodes
2019	Love, Death & Robots	Helen	Episode: "Suits"
2019	Momma Named Me Sheriff	Mrs. Gathimplewattir	Episode: "Smelly Glenn"
2019	American Dad!	Additional Voices	3 episodes
2020	Marvel Future Avengers	Diamondback, Mekara, Kaboom	English dub; 4 episodes
2021	Robot Chicken	Monopoly Mom, Linda, Restaurant Hostess	Episode: "May Cause Light Cannibalism"
2021	Family Guy	Rachel Goldman	Episode: "The Marrying Kind"
2023–present	The Legend of Vox Machina	The Matron of Ravens	2 episodes
2023	The Loud House	Frances, Kelly	Episode: "Waking History"
2024–2026	X-Men '97	Magik / Darkchylde, Callisto, Boy, Judge	4 episodes
2024–2025	Blood of Zeus	Hecate, Maenad, Potnia	8 episodes
2026	Invincible	Omni-Man's Mother	Episode: "I'll Give You the Grand Tour"

==== Video games ====
Year	Title	Role	Notes
2002	American Idol	Judge	
2002	Star Trek: Starfleet Command III	Additional Voices	
2003	Star Wars: Knights of the Old Republic	Juhani	
2004	Van Helsing	Villager	
2004	EverQuest II	Generic Female Half Elf Merchant, Generic Female Barbarian Merchant, Generic Female Dark Elf Merchant, Generic Female High Elf Merchant, Generic Female Erudite Merchant, Generic Female Wood Elf Merchant, Generic Female Froglok Merchant, Generic Female Ogre Merchant	
2004	Vampire: The Masquerade – Bloodlines	Damsel, Heather Poe, Rosa	
2005	God of War	Twins	
2005	Call of Duty 2	Russian Female Soldier	
2006	Night Watch	Tigra	
2006	Justice League Heroes	Wonder Woman	
2006	Destroy All Humans! 2	Natalya Ivanova	
2006	Downhill Jam	MacKenzie	
2006	The Sopranos: Road to Respect	Unique	
2006	Thrillville	Adult Female	
2007	Supreme Commander	Elite Commander Dostya	
2007	Command & Conquer 3: Tiberium Wars	Scrin A.I.	
2007	Spider-Man 3	Frances Louise Barrison / Shriek	
2007	Supreme Commander: Forged Alliance	Order Commander Vedelta, Elite Commander Ivanna Qostya	
2007	The Golden Compass	Disobedient Larry, Froederick, Tanner	
2008	Destroy All Humans! Big Willy Unleashed	Patty Wurst, Natalya Ivanova	
2008	Iron Man	Whitney Frost / Madame Masque	
2008	The Incredible Hulk	Summervox, Minerva Leader	
2008	WALL-E	Axiom Passenger	
2008	Saints Row 2	DJ CB DeCaro, FUNK DJ, Ronin, Additional Voices	
2008	Command & Conquer: Red Alert 3	A.I.	Also Uprising
2009	Halo Wars	Serina A.I., Additional Voices	
2009	Watchmen: The End Is Nigh	Twilight Lady	
2009	Stormrise	Sable	
2009	Infamous	Female Pedestrian	
2009	Brütal Legend	Battle Nuns, Dominatrices	
2009	Dragon Age: Origins	Various	
2009	Ben Drowned	Rosa	Archival footage (Vampire: The Masquerade – Bloodlines)
2010	Mass Effect 2	Jack, Kalara Tomi, Lilith, Eclipse Enemies	
2010	Dead to Rights: Retribution	Marla Bates	
2010	Alpha Protocol	Scarlet Lake	
2010	StarCraft II: Wings of Liberty	Lady Chaos, Lassara, Broodmother Niadara, Additional Voices	
2010	Ninety-Nine Nights II	Zazi	English dub
2010	Halo: Reach	Female Trooper #1	
2010	Fallout: New Vegas	Gloria Van Graff, Janet, Jas Wilkins, Morgan Blake, others	
2011	Infamous 2	Female Vampire	Festival of Blood DLC
2011	Driver: San Francisco	Leila Yassin, Jessica Adams	
2011	Gears of War 3	Female Former, Various Stranded	
2011	Ace Combat: Assault Horizon	Coast Guard 6595	English dub
2011	The Lord of the Rings: War in the North	Arwen, Saenathra	
2011	Saints Row: The Third	Pedestrians	
2011	Star Wars: The Old Republic	Sharack Breev, Lady Aitalla, Casey Rix, Ann'ya, Imani, Kalda Biss, others	
2011–15	Skylanders series	Hex, Fox, Yeti, Hijinx, Knight Mare	
2012	Kingdoms of Amalur: Reckoning	Athyll, Additional Voices	
2012	Mass Effect 3	Jack	
2012	Resident Evil: Operation Raccoon City	Ada Wong	English dub
2012	Diablo III	Asheara	Also Reaper of Souls
2012	Guild Wars 2	Mary, Inspector Ellen Kiel, Human, Centaur, Asura, Sylvari, Norn	
2012	Resident Evil 6	Ada Wong	
2012	XCOM: Enemy Unknown	XCOM A.I.	
2013	Gears of War: Judgement	Female Onyx Guard	
2013	The Last of Us	Hunter	
2013	Disney Infinity	Additional Voices	
2013	The Bureau: XCOM Declassified	Angela Weaver	
2013	Saints Row IV	The Voices of Virtual Steelport	
2013	Lightning Returns: Final Fantasy XIII	Priestess, Announcer	
2014	The Elder Scrolls Online	Female Breton #2, Female Khajit #2	
2014	Dawngate	Freia, Kindra	
2014	WildStar	Aviel the Weaver, Apprentice Laveka, Deadringer Shallos, Ayita Sinnatus, others	
2014	Murdered: Soul Suspect	Additional Voices	
2014	Destiny	Amanda Holliday, City Civilian, Ship Comm, City P.A.	
2015	Infinite Crisis	Atomic Poison Ivy	
2015	Heroes of the Storm	Sgt. Hammer	
2015	Batman: Arkham Knight	Sergeant Hanrahan	
2015	Mad Max	Hope	
2015	Lego Dimensions	Wicked Witch, Lois Lane, Janine Melnitz	
2015	Halo 5: Guardians	Spartan	
2015	Call of Duty: Black Ops III	Additional Voices	
2015	Fallout 4	Sole Survivor (Female)	
2015	StarCraft II: Legacy of the Void	Adept	
2016	XCOM 2	US Soldier	
2016	Headlander	Artemis-11, Female Patrol Shepard	
2016	Titanfall 2	Gates	
2016	Final Fantasy XV	Comrades	English dub
2017	For Honor	The Orochi (Female)	
2017	Halo Wars 2	Serina	
2017	Guardians of the Galaxy: The Telltale Series	Meredith Quill	
2017	LawBreakers	Additional Voices	
2017	Destiny 2	Amanda Holliday, Empress Caiatl, Female Extras	Also Forsaken
2018	Call of Duty: Black Ops 4	Scarlett Rhodes	
2018	OK K.O.! Let's Play Heroes	K.O., T.K.O.	
2019	Rage 2	Loosum, Wellspring Civilian, Gunbarrel Guard, Vineland Wallrat, Vineland PA	
2019	The Outer Worlds	ADA, Lilya Hagen, Additional Voices	
2019	Death Stranding	The Evo-Devo Biologist, Operator, Nurse	
2020	The Last of Us Part II	Seraphites	
2020	Bugsnax	Cheepoof	
2020	Twin Mirror	Kathy	
2021	Teppen	Ada Wong	
2021	Ratchet & Clank: Rift Apart	Ms. Zurkon	
2021	Cookie Run: Kingdom	Avocado Cookie	
2021	Legends of Runeterra	Camphor, the Doubt	
2021	Marvel's Midnight Suns	Agatha Harkness	
2022	Tactics Ogre: Reborn	Cistina Phoraena	
2022	Return to Monkey Island	Iron Rose, Chuckie	
2023	Diablo IV	Druid (Female)	
2023	Mortal Kombat 1	Khameleon, Orin, Janet Cage, The Kalima	
2023	Cookie Run: The Darkest Night	Avocado Cookie, Rider Mage	
2024	The Legend of Heroes: Trails Through Daybreak	Aida, citizens	
2025	The Legend of Heroes: Trails Through Daybreak II	Dominique Lanster, Aida, citizens	
2025	Date Everything!	Dasha	
2026	Star Wars: Zero Company	The Mentor	

=== Live action roles ===
==== Film ====
Year	Title	Role	Notes
2007	Because I Said So	Computer Girl	Uncredited
2010	Rubber	Deputy Denise	
2013	3 Geezers!	Lisa	

==== Television ====
Year	Title	Role	Notes
2005	Close to Home	Lisa	Episode: "Suburban Prostitution"
2006	Everybody Hates Chris	Ticket Seller	Episode: "Everybody Hates Drew"
2006	CSI: NY	Nurse Yvette	Episode: "And Here's to You, Mrs. Azrael"
2007	Cold Case	Hooker	Episode: "Thrill Kill"
2009	iCarly	Judge Marla	Episode: "iCook"
2009	Strong Medicine	Brandi	Episode: "Feeling No Pain"
2010	Wizards of Waverly Place	News Reporter	Episode: "Alex Saves Mason (Wizards Unleashed)"
2011	Person of Interest	Mrs. Kovach	Uncredited; Episode: "Pilot"
2013	Franklin & Bash	Kelli	Episode: "Coffee and Cream"
2013	Criminal Minds	Melody Grimes	Episode: "Route 66"
2017	Orphan Black	Michael	Episode: "Let the Children and the Childbearers Toil"
2017	No Activity	Officer Eastman	Episode: "The Raid"
2018	S.W.A.T.	ER Nurse Violet	Episode: "K-Town"
