= Scott Gairdner =

American comedy writer and director

Scott Gairdner (born 1985) is an American comedy writer, director, and podcaster, known for creating the viral YouTube video "Sex Offender Shuffle", the animated parody Tiny Fuppets, the Comedy Central animated series Moonbeam City, and Netflix's Saturday Morning All Star Hits!. He also co-created and has co-hosted the theme park podcast Podcast: The Ride since 2017.

== Career ==
While studying film production at Loyola Marymount University in 2003, Scott Gairdner, alongside fellow filmmaker Michael Rousselet, were among the first to promote The Room as a cult film.

Gairdner began his career by creating comedy videos for his YouTube channel, which he started in 2006. He uploaded the viral video "Sex Offender Shuffle", a parody of "The Super Bowl Shuffle", on his channel in 2009.

In 2009, Gairdner created Tiny Fuppets, an animated parody of Jim Henson's Muppet Babies. The show was named as "Most Bizarre Knockoff Ever" by Huffington Post.

For two years (2010–2012) he worked at Funny or Die as a staff writer and director.

In 2012, he was hired to work for the TBS show Conan as a writer and director. During his time working for Conan, he shot dozens of sketches for the show.

He created and served as the executive producer of Moonbeam City, an animated series on Comedy Central that debuted on September 16, 2015. Gairdner credits the videos he posted on his YouTube channel for gaining the attention of Funny or Die, and later, Conan, which in turn served as the "springboard" that led to him being able to create Moonbeam City.

In 2017, as part of promoting the latest installment in his Clip Cup series, Gairdner helped launch the fictitious OTT platform Vioobu, which managed to dupe several publications, as well as viewers, due to its expansive library of content.

Since 2017, Gairdner has co-hosted a theme park podcast, Podcast: The Ride, alongside fellow comedians and theme park fans Mike Carlson and Jason Sheridan.

In 2021, Gairdner executive-produced and co-wrote 8 episodes of Saturday Morning All Star Hits!, a Netflix series created by Kyle Mooney and Ben Jones that pays tribute to Saturday morning cartoon blocks from the 1980s and 1990s.

In 2025, Gairdner was the segment director for the 97th Academy Awards, reuniting him with Conan O'Brien, who was hosting that year's ceremony. Gairdner discussed the experience in an episode of his podcast, in which he credited his skill at "cinematic cold opens" as the reason he was brought back. The ceremony began with a sequence, directed by Gairdner, in which O'Brien climbed out of the body of Demi Moore, referencing that year's best picture nominee The Substance. O'Brien returned as host in 2026 for the 98th Academy Awards, with Gairdner once again directing the ceremonies pre-filmed segments. This included an opening sequence where O'Brien, dressed as Aunt Gladys from the film Weapons, ran through many of the nominated films.

== Personal life ==
He is married to Erin Pade and has two sons with her.
