= Jack (Mass Effect) =

Fictional character in the space opera video game series

- Mass Effect character
- Jack as she appears in Mass Effect 3 (2012)
- First game: Mass Effect 2 (2010)
- Voiced by: Courtenay Taylor

In-universe information
- Skill: Biotics

Jack is a character in the role-playing video game series Mass Effect by BioWare. Jack appears as a squadmate in Mass Effect 2, and may appear in Mass Effect 3 as a supporting character provided she survives the events of the previous game. Jack is voiced by Courtenay Taylor. Within the series, Jack was orphaned at an early age and was kidnapped by the anthropocentric paramilitary group Cerberus to be exploited as a test subject. Designated Subject Zero by Cerberus, she is considered to be one of the most powerful human biotics in existence in the Mass Effect trilogy as the result of unethical experiments conducted by Cerberus to enhance human biotic ability, though her traumatic experiences have molded her into an antisocial and psychopathic individual.

Although Jack was nominated for a video game character award in 2010, and is a popular subject for fan art and cosplay, she proved to be divisive among video game journalists; the character's depiction in Mass Effect 2 in particular faced criticism for filling out the "edgy" archetype of a villain with a vulnerable side, whereas her appearance in Mass Effect 3 was better received.

== Character overview ==
Jack is born with the ability to "manipulate dark energy and create mass effect fields" called biotics, allowing for telekinesis and various other abilities. When initially encountered by Shepard in Mass Effect 2, Jack wears nothing from the waist up except for a few strategically placed leather straps, and carries a belligerent, foul-mouthed and violent temperament; the result of the accumulated psychological abuse inflicted on her while she was imprisoned at a remote Cerberus scientific research outpost throughout her childhood and adolescent years.

Jack is available as a romantic option for male Shepard. The player could approach her in two ways: she could either be treated as a one-night stand that will leave her resentful of Shepard, or Shepard could gain her trust slowly, which eventually reveals a more vulnerable side to her personality.

If Liara T'Soni is present during the mission to evacuate Grissom Academy in Mass Effect 3, she claims that Jack's real first name is Jennifer.

== Creation and development ==
An illustration of Jack's tattoos from The Art of the Mass Effect Universe

Jack was designed as a punk, and her backstory is illustrated through the various tattoos all over her body, which cover her physical scars in a deliberate attempt by Jack to erase her past and author her own story. At some point in her past she escaped the Cerberus research facility she was held in; she became involved in criminal activities like piracy, kidnapping, vandalism, and murder, and even joined a religious cult; all in an attempt to find some meaning for the horrible treatment she was forced to endure. Her pants, which were part of her prison uniform, were pulled down to reflect her unique sense of style in Mass Effect 2. The character artist team tried their best to showcase her tattoos while attempting to covering her chest to some degree due to concerns about how exposed her body was. Her face is modeled after an unidentified actress' head scans, while her head is shaved bald to evoke an authentic punk feel instead of a "supermodel with ink". The character was redesigned for Mass Effect 3, although her concept had been finalized before it was decided that she would be teaching biotic students at Grissom Academy's Ascension Project as part of the narrative. She wears more clothing and grows her hair out to reflect her ongoing maturation, while still retaining the rebellious aspect of her character as she does not wear the standard regulation uniform of a classroom teacher.

Jack's voice actress Courtenay Taylor said she was excited to play Jack when she first read the part, noting that it was "refreshing to see someone who looked different, had a different perspective on things, and had a different way of dealing with people". She disclosed that she drew a lot from her own past experiences to prepare for the role, as she had also shaved her head bald and listened to punk rock music during her youth. She remarked that Jack's character was fleshed out better in the sequel, as her anger management skills have improved and that she has both tough and soft aspects to her personality. Taylor considered Jack to be a "role model", noting that some fans have personally conveyed to her their compliments for her acting performance and expressed appreciation of Jack's characterization as a life changing experience for them, and that they could relate to her social misfit persona on a personal level.

Brian Kindregan wrote Jack in Mass Effect 2. In 2021 he revealed that Jack was originally supposed to be pansexual in Mass Effect 2, but BioWare made her available as a romantic option only for male Shepard after the first game in the series was criticized by mainstream media, especially Fox News.

== Appearances ==
=== Video games ===
Shepard may recruit Jack, referred to as Subject Zero in her dossier issued by Cerberus, from a prison facility operated by the Blue Suns mercenary company called Purgatory, to join the suicide mission against the Collectors. She is considered so dangerous that she was confined in cryogenic stasis after she was caught. She may be convinced to join Shepard's mission after her release, in exchange for Shepard's cooperation handing over Cerberus' files about the science facility where Cerberus tortured and abused her, which the organization's loyalist senior officer Miranda Lawson would object to.

Jack's loyalty mission involves her finding some closure from her past; after perusing the files she acquired from Shepard, she requests to be taken to the facility where she was raised so that she could destroy it. Shepard and Jack travel to the abandoned facility, disrupt mercenary activity there, and destroy the facility. If both Jack and Miranda's loyalty missions have been completed, a fight will ensue between Jack and Miranda on board the Normandy. If the player has a high enough Paragon or Renegade score, Shepard can stop the fight. Otherwise, Shepard is forced to side with either Jack or Miranda, causing the other to become disloyal unless Shepard makes an effort to follow up in a subsequent conversation. If Shepard is in a stable romantic relationship with Jack prior to the final mission, Jack comes to Shepard's cabin and spends quality time with him, culminating with her smiling peacefully while they lie together on his bed.

Jack appears in Mass Effect 3 if the player imports a save game where she survives the suicide mission in Mass Effect 2, with the option to continue their relationship from 2 if she was Shepard's paramour. After defeating the Collectors, she is approached by the Systems Alliance and was offered a teaching position at the Jon Grissom Academy's Ascension Project to train biotic students. She accepted and officially joined the staff under the alias "Jacqueline Nought", though she was forced to tone down her behavior and profanity. She is present during the Cerberus attack on the station, attempting to defend her students from being captured. With Shepard's help, she, Kahlee Sanders, and the students managed to escape. Shepard can then decide to have the students support the Alliance's 103rd Marine Division, or send the students to war as an artillery unit. Regardless of the player's choice to allocate her students' roles, Jack is included as a "War Asset" in the galactic war effort. If Shepard does not travel to Grissom Academy in time, Jack and the remaining students will be abducted by Cerberus. During the raid on Cerberus' Cronos Station headquarters, video footage of Jack being subjected to Cerberus surgery can be seen on one console, and in the room following that, she will appear as an enemy unit known as a Phantom and taunt Shepard with her signature battle cries from Mass Effect 2.

In Mass Effect 3 Jack may be listed on the Normandy SR-2's memorial wall at the Crew Deck if at any point she does not survive the events of Mass Effect 2 and/or 3; her name will be engraved as Jacqueline Nought.

Like other past and present surviving squad members, Jack makes an appearance in the Mass Effect 3: Citadel downloadable content pack, which adds character moments which will vary in content depending on dialogue and event choices or whether Shepard is in a romance with her. Jack is also available as a temporary squadmate in the Armax Arsenal Arena combat simulator.

=== In other media ===
Jack is the central character of issue #7 of the comic series Mass Effect: Foundation, where she was pursued by Blue Suns mercenaries as well as Cerberus operatives prior to her incarceration at Purgatory in Mass Effect 2.

== Critical reception ==
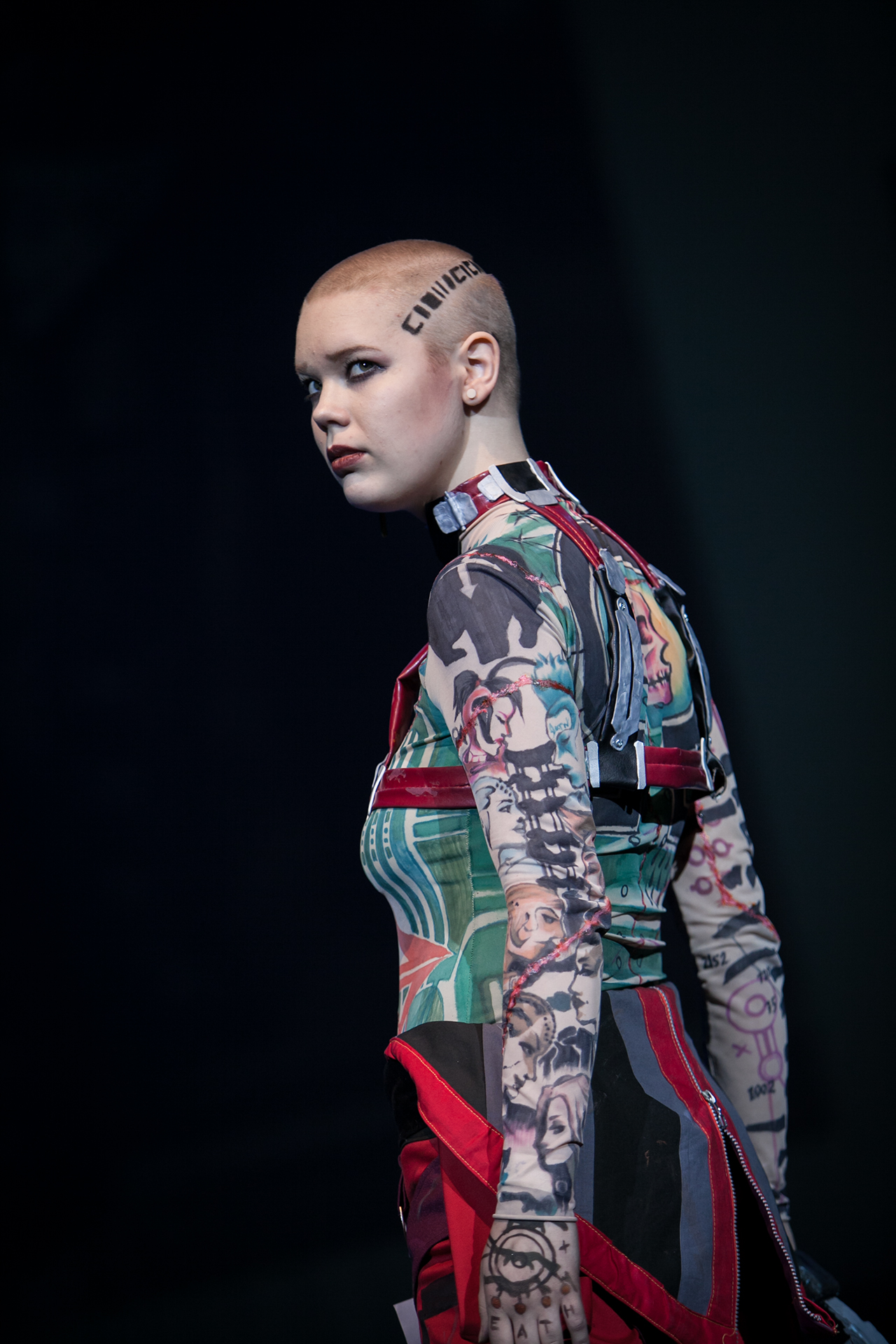
A cosplayer reproducing Jack's appearance from Mass Effect 2

In August 2012, Kotaku and Polygon reported that Jack was intended to be the protagonist of an upcoming Mass Effect point-and-click adventure fangame. The character continues to be referenced by fans of the series in popular culture, such as fan art and cosplay, due to her unique appearance. Jasmin Mohamed from Screen Rant noted the numerous similarities between Jack and Eleven from Stranger Things, drawing attention to their backstories as well as the fact that both characters go through the same character arc, which involves them learning how to interact and work with people that actually want to help them instead of using them for their own personal gain.

Prior to Mass Effect 2's release, there were concerns about the character's scantily dressed look as well as her characterization in preview trailers. Alec Meer from Rock, Paper, Shotgun described his first impression of the character from her initial trailer released in late 2009 to be a foul-mouthed "Big Brother contestant with guns and tattoos" who seethes with "cartoon anger".

Jack has received mixed reviews for her appearances in the Mass Effect series. Parish from 1Up.com considered Jack the "poster girl for ME2's journey over the edge". He observed that "ME2 was more often guilty of taking its edginess cartoonishly far and venturing into the realm of the ridiculous", citing her lack of practical and sensible clothing, as well as surly behavior akin to an immature teenager as examples of the game's overcompensation for a darker tone. Ryan Winterhalter, also from 1Up.com, criticized Jack's character progression in Mass Effect 2 as a sexist trope and alleged that the only way to help Jack reach some sort of closure following her loyalty mission is for a male Shepard to sleep with her. He described the limitations that he perceived of her character development as "a male power fantasy, and it's excruciatingly poor writing". Tyler Wilde from PC Gamer criticized the character as banal, noting her "grisly past means she doesn't have any interesting space culture to talk about", and that her conflict with Shepard consists of repetitive assertions from her about how "Cerberus is bad and we shouldn't like them". With regards to her edgy persona, another PC Gamer staff member commented that "Jack would have been bad in a mid-'90s THQ game". GamesRadar's Jordan Baughman identified Jack as an example of "The Recalcitrant Shrew", a minimally dressed and needlessly combative female companion character archetype found in other BioWare titles. Her sex scene with Shepard in Mass Effect 2 has been labelled by GameSpot as one of the worst in video game history.

Nevertheless, the character has received some positive reception, particularly for her appearance in Mass Effect 3. Jack was nominated for Most Compelling Character at the second Annual Inside Gaming Awards in 2010, but lost to John Marston from the Red Dead video game series. Dutch theologian Frank Bosman cited Jack as a good example of Mass Effect 2's morally complex cast of characters, and that her character arc represents the effective use of loyalty missions to represent the game's morality system due to their tendency to present the player with difficult moral decisions. PC Gamer ranked her the overall 9th best Mass Effect companion; other staff members sympathized with the character, citing her tragic backstory of "knowing only pain and isolation and with little recourse beyond using her potent biotic powers to kill anyone who have hurt her", and highlighting that Jack finds a new sense of purpose in the sequel by channeling her trauma into activism and training young biotic students. Gamesradar included Jack in their list of beloved mentally damaged characters, and her tattoos one of the "sickest" (Note: Slang term for very good, excellent, awesome, badass.) in gaming. Steven Hopper from IGN placed Jack at eighth place on his 2012 list of best Mass Effect teammates. IGN also included the evolution of Jack's character arc in their later article listing of 13 Best Mass Effect Moments, noting that her becoming a teacher was a nice way to show that she has put her broken old life behind her and has moved on to a purposeful new life. Entertainment Weekly included Jack in their lists of "15 Kick-Ass Women in Videogames" and "25 Coolest Videogame Characters". Matt Cronn from Geeks Under Grace praised Jack as an example of an excellent, well-written character by BioWare. He cited a tender romantic scene between Jack and Shepard during the Citadel DLC pack as one of his favorite scenes in all of gaming, and said her evolving character proves "just how powerful video game storytelling can be when player choice can influence so much".
