= Natalie Richard =

Canadian television personality

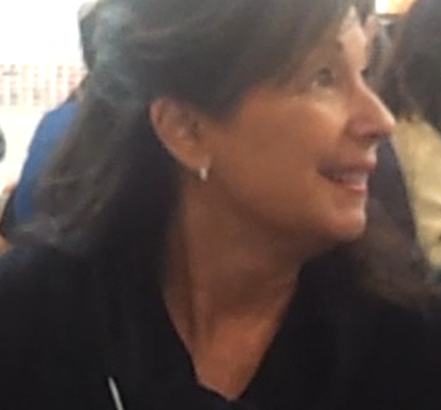
Natalie Richard photographed at the Salon du livre de Montréal in 2019

Natalie Richard is a Canadian television personality, formerly a VJ on both the English-language MuchMusic and French-language MusiquePlus networks. On MuchMusic she hosted French Kiss for several years, which aired French language music videos. She also took the occasional acting role for television and film. She was most recently based in Montreal working on various television projects.
