= Voice of the Turtle =

Voice of the Turtle is a musical group specializing in Sephardic music. Voice of the Turtle is unique in its emphasis on doing original historical research before making recordings. The band members travel the world looking for documents of Sephardic songs, and also interview community members who may remember particular musical arrangements. Their work is of both musical and historical import. An article in Rootsworld says:

"Based in Boston, Voice of the Turtle is one of the best-known groups performing Sephardic music in America. Theirs is an unusual marriage of artists who see the power of music more than just a presentation to a concert audience. 'We are all galvanized by the idea that it is critically important to preserve oral traditions in any culture. It's not so much about preserving Sephardic music but encouraging people to look at their own culture. Take from the people around you the treasures that are often missed. Learn to value the treasures that the elders have brought with them,' says Wachs."

The group members are:

- Derek Burrows
- Lisle Kulbach
- Jay Rosenberg
- Judith Wachs
- Ian Pomerantz (Starting 2011)

Wachs died in October 2008. A memorial concert was held at the Somerville Theatre in Somerville, MA on October 19, 2009. After a several year hiatus, Voice of the Turtle original members Lisle Kulbach and Jay Rosenberg have reformed the group with the addition of Sephardic singer and instrumentalist Ian Pomerantz. The group continues to perform their signature arrangements of traditional Sephardic songs.

== History and recordings ==
The group was established in 1978, and has twelve full-length recordings. Nine recordings were published by Titanic Records, a leading publisher of early music. The book "Sacred Song in America" by Stephen Marini contains a detailed history of the group, including the story of how Wachs (who comes from an Ashkenazic Jewish background) first came to be interested in Sephardic music.

Music by Voice of the Turtle is often described as unusual. The recording "A Different Night, a Passover Musical Anthology," contains 23 versions of the song Chad Gadya. The New York Times comments (regarding the album "From the Shores of the Golden Horn': Music of the Spanish Jews of Turkey,") that "far from being esoteric, this powerfully expressive repertory will leave no one unmoved."

Voice of the Turtle has a notably extensive repertoire of Sephardic music. Ethnomusicologist Joel Bresler notes that their music is noteworthy for the extensive archival research behind it.

== Languages and instruments ==
Voice of the Turtle sings in a variety of languages typical of Sephardic music, including not only Spanish, Hebrew, and English, but also Judeo-Spanish (Ladino), Aramaic, Yiddish, Judeo-Italian, Judeo-Provencal, and Judeo-Arabic.

Instruments played by the group include bagpipes, kamanja, cornettino, chalumeau, dumbek, riqq, shawm, bombard, 'ud, saz, and ney.
