= Manhattan Nocturne =

1996 novel by Colin Harrison

- First edition
- Author: Colin Harrison
- Language: English
- Genre: Crime
- Publisher: Crown Publishing Group
- Publication date: September 1996
- Publication place: United States
- Media type: Print (hardcover)
- Pages: 355 pp.
- ISBN: 0-517-58492-1
- OCLC: 34799099
- Dewey Decimal: 813/.54 21
- LC Class: PS3558.A6655 M36 1996

Manhattan Nocturne is a crime novel by Colin Harrison set in Manhattan, first published in 1996. The novel was published in America in hardcover by Crown and remains in print by Picador in trade paperback. Fifteen foreign, paperback, and bookclub editions were published and the book was selected a New York Times Notable Book.

== Plot ==
Porter Wren is a columnist and crime reporter for a New York City newspaper. He is a popular journalist. He acts as a listening ear for people. He attends an after-work party hosted by the publishing magnate, where he meets Caroline Crowley.

Mrs. Crowley was recently widowed by the mysterious murder of her husband Simon Crowley. Crowley was a movie director who would often disappear at night to record things. Crowley's body was inexplicably discovered in a sealed building that was about to be demolished.

Caroline invites him to her apartment where she shows him confidential police reports related to the death of her husband. She wants Porter to investigate the murder and as an incentive seduces him even though he is married with children.

He meets with Hobbs, the owner of the newspaper he works for, who wants him to find the voyeuristic recording Simon Crowley took of Caroline and Hobbs's strange sexual encounter. His life becomes rather violent and he is beaten, his life is threatened, his home is invaded, and his son is shot. During his investigation into the first videotape, he discovers another recording displaying the aftermath of the sexual encounter and explaining the death of Simon Crowley.

Wren realizes over the events of the story that the subjects he writes his newspaper stories about are not just stories.

== Film ==
A movie adaptation retitled Manhattan Night was filmed in New York in late 2014, directed by Brian DeCubellis and starring Adrien Brody, Yvonne Strahovski, Campbell Scott and Jennifer Beals. On May 20, 2016 the film was released worldwide by Lionsgate Premiere.
