= Miranda Lawson =

Fictional character in the Mass Effect video game series

- Mass Effect character
- Miranda Lawson in Mass Effect 2 (2010)
- First appearance: Mass Effect Galaxy (2009)
- Voiced by: Yvonne Strahovski

In-universe information
- Class: Cerberus Officer
- Skill: Biotics; Technology

Miranda Lawson is a fictional character in the role-playing video game series Mass Effect by BioWare. In it, Miranda is an officer of the pro-human group Cerberus, first appearing in the 2009 iOS game Mass Effect Galaxy, and then serving as a squad mate in Mass Effect 2. In addition to these, the character also makes an appearance in the Mass Effect: Redemption comic series, in Mass Effect 3 if she survived the events of the suicide mission in Mass Effect 2, and in issues 5, 6, 8 and 9 of the Mass Effect: Foundation comic series. She is revealed to have been genetically designed by her father, Henry Lawson, to be perfect, and ran away from home to join Cerberus.

Miranda was modelled after Yvonne Strahovski, who also provided the voice for Miranda. Like Strahovski, Miranda was originally blonde but the character was changed to have black hair to complement her "femme fatale" look. Camera angles and shots were employed to emphasise her sexuality. David Kates composed her theme for Mass Effect 2. Miranda was featured prominently in promotional art, demo footage, trailers and advertisements for Mass Effect 2.

The character has received a generally positive reception, though several commentators have discussed the numerous camera shots of her buttocks in Mass Effect 2, a creative decision then-marketing director of Bioware, David Silverman, has defended as an integral part of her character.

== Character overview ==
In Mass Effect 2, Miranda Lawson is revealed to be a high-ranking operative of the pro-human organization Cerberus, and has been genetically designed for superior intelligence and physical traits. She is sterile and unable to have children due to genetic manipulation and resulting damage from a benign neoplasm. She is shown to be a capable leader, exemplified with her being one of the few members of the squad who can successfully lead a fireteam in the final mission without anyone dying, despite feeling she does not command respect like Shepard does. Lawson is leader of Cerberus' Lazarus Cell, tasked with reviving Commander Shepard. Aboard the Normandy, the player's spaceship, she is Shepard's second-in-command and Executive Officer, and files mission reports directly to the Illusive Man.

Miranda was the artificially created daughter of Henry Lawson, a rich and powerful businessman from Earth. Rather than give her a human mother to randomize her genetic code, Henry took his own DNA and doubled his X chromosome, hoping to create a dynasty. Unhappy with his attempts to exert control over her life, Miranda joined Cerberus and secretly sent her sister, who was created in the same way she was, into hiding to protect her from their father. Provided the player completes a mission to prevent her sister's abduction, she ultimately becomes loyal to Shepard. In one of the story's possible endings, she proves her loyalty when the Illusive Man gives her an order to prevent Shepard from destroying the Collectors' Space Station by refusing and announcing her resignation before ending the communication abruptly.

== Creation and development ==
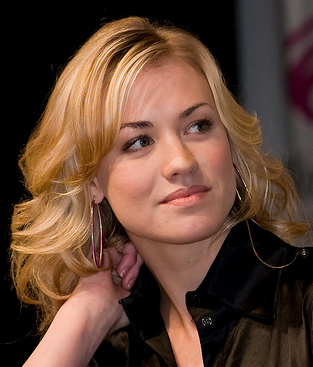
Yvonne Strahovski at WonderCon 2009.

Early concept art for Miranda focused on balancing her sex appeal with a uniform suitable for her position as a Cerberus officer. Originally conceived as blonde, after her uniform was designed, it was decided black hair would fit better with her "femme fatale" look. Casey Hudson has said her uniform was made tight due to her being designed to be "perfect" and "beautiful". For her role as Miranda Lawson, Yvonne Strahovski spoke in her natural speaking voice and native Australian accent.

Miranda is an example of a character who is defined by the quality of physical attractiveness. In Mass Effect 2, camera angles and shots such as a close-up of her buttocks were employed to focus on "her curves and sexuality", identified as key parts of her character, her being someone genetically engineered to be "perfect". David Kates composed Miranda's musical theme, intending to "demonstrate her strength, but also her vulnerable side, and a sadness that is deep inside her". Mac Walters and Patrick Weekes wrote her character for Mass Effect 2. Jay Watamaniuk wrote her for Mass Effect 3.

== Appearances ==
=== Mass Effect 2 ===
Miranda is one of Shepard's squad members in Mass Effect 2. She's one of the top agents of the pro-human organization Cerberus, assigned to supervise the "Lazarus Project", which was the project that brought Shepard back to life. When Shepard's sent by Cerberus' leader, the Illusive Man, to stop the main antagonists, the Collectors, Miranda joins as the new Normandy's executive officer, giving mission reports to the Illusive Man. Through conversations with her, Shepard learns of Miranda's background. She tells Shepard that she was genetically "created" by her father, Henry Lawson, who is one of the wealthiest humans in the galaxy. She tells Shepard that she was created to be the genetically "perfect" human, able to heal from injuries more quickly, and with more powerful biotic abilities, as well as exceptional schooling, all as part of her father's desire to have a "dynasty" to follow him. Her father's persistence in making Miranda as "perfect" as possible resulted in her not having a normal childhood, forbidden from having any friends or relations with anybody else, and forced to enhance her abilities constantly. At an old enough age, Miranda was able to escape from her father, hinting that "shots were fired", and fled to Cerberus, who she had learned her father was an investor to. Cerberus gave her asylum, and her father cut off his support of Cerberus.

Later on in the game, Miranda asks Shepard for help to save her sister. She reveals that her father, after Miranda had escaped from him, created another daughter, Miranda's genetic twin sister, Oriana. Miranda was able to rescue Oriana, taking her from her father and giving her to another family to have a normal life. She tells Shepard that her father has been able to track Oriana down and has hired mercenaries to apprehend her. Miranda has arranged for Cerberus to safely move Oriana and her family away but needs Shepard's help. If Shepard helps, Miranda learns that the only friend she ever had or trusted, Niket, had betrayed her and is working with the mercenaries to take Oriana away. The following confrontation leaves the captain of the mercenaries dead as well as Niket, who, depending on Shepard's actions, is killed either by Miranda herself or by the mercenary captain. Afterward, Miranda sees Oriana with her family, and if Shepard convinces her, goes and meets Oriana, introducing herself to her.

Afterward, if Shepard converses with Miranda more, she admits to Shepard that even though she's supposed to be perfect, she feels that everything she had done is the result of her father genetic tailoring of her, not because of her actions. Shepard can convince her that she gives her father too much credit, saying that while he did give Miranda her abilities and gifts, everything she has accomplished is the result of her using those abilities that she had been given. This seems to reassure Miranda and she thanks Shepard for it.

During the "Suicide Mission", Miranda can survive or die depending on the player's choices in the mission and also if they do Miranda's loyalty mission. If the player uses a male Shepard character, they can pursue Miranda as a possible romance.

=== Mass Effect 3 ===
Miranda returns in Mass Effect 3, provided the player does not import a save where she dies. After defeating the Collectors, she has left Cerberus. Given she was a high-ranking Cerberus officer, she indicated the Illusive Man ordered a hit on her, causing her to go on the run. Shepard meets Miranda on the Citadel, where she expresses her concerns that Oriana was found by her father. After a brief contact with Miranda, where she expresses concern that her father is working with the Illusive Man, she asks Shepard to meet her on the Citadel, where she asks Shepard for access to Alliance resources, though she won't say why even if Shepard presses her. If Shepard refuses her access, she accepts Shepard's choice and leaves. If Shepard grants her access, she then confesses that when she had headed the Lazarus Project to revive Shepard, she wanted to put a control chip in Shepard's brain, to ensure Shepard wouldn't go rogue, but the Illusive Man, not wanting to take away who Shepard was, ordered her not to. Miranda admits that she was hypocritical in this since she had been doing everything she could to keep her father from controlling her life and Oriana's. Shepard can forgive her, saying that the main point is that she brought him/her back.

Later, Shepard finds Miranda in a Cerberus lab disguised as a refugee camp, Sanctuary, where her father had been running experiments on the refugees, as well as her father and Oriana. If Shepard is able to negotiate with Henry to let Oriana go, Miranda then kills him with a biotic attack. If Shepard is unable to negotiate, Miranda will still attack her father to save Oriana, and while she will kill him, he will fatally shoot her in the process. Miranda's fate also depends on if Shepard had warned her earlier on about the Cerberus assassin Kai Leng, who Miranda encounters on Sanctuary. If Shepard didn't warn her, or refused her access to Alliance resources, or didn't do her loyalty mission in Mass Effect 2, Miranda will die. She'll also die if she was romanced by a male Shepard in Mass Effect 2, but then breaks up with her in Mass Effect 3. If Shepard had completed Miranda's loyalty mission, as well as warned her of Kai Leng, Miranda survives and, after taking Oriana to safety, assists in the war effort.

Like other past and present surviving squad members, Miranda makes an appearance in the Mass Effect 3: Citadel downloadable content pack, which adds character moments which will vary in content depending on dialogue and event choices or whether Shepard is in a romance with her. Miranda is also available as a temporary squadmate in the Armax Arsenal Arena combat simulator.

=== In other media ===
Miranda first appeared in the iOS game Mass Effect Galaxy, released in 2009. In Galaxy, Miranda communicates with Jacob Taylor as a hologram and is his main informant on how to stop the batarian threat

Miranda returns in the 2009 comic book series Mass Effect: Redemption, where she first encounters Liara T'Soni and Feron on Omega, offering to help them recover the lost Commander Shepard. After meeting Liara with the Illusive Man, she then takes Liara and Feron back to Omega, telling them that Shepard's body is still on the station and instructs them to recover it, with Cerberus reimbursing them for their efforts. Later, when the Shadow Broker's agent Tazzik makes off with Shepard's body to sell to the Collectors, Miranda asks the Illusive Man for permission to stop him, but the Illusive Man tells her to wait, saying that they need to find out why the Collectors are interested in Shepard. Miranda then notices Feron and Liara giving pursuit and asks to follow them, but the Illusive Man once again tells her to wait. At the end of the series, when Liara rescues Shepard's body and brings it to a Cerberus facility, Miranda tells Liara that she has doubts on whether or not Shepard can be revived, but assures her that if it's possible to bring Shepard back, Cerberus will do all they can.

Miranda is also a major supporting character in the Mass Effect: Foundation comic series, a prequel to the original Mass Effect trilogy and stars the main antagonist of the Mass Effect 3: Citadel DLC Maya Brooks as a point of view character.

== Reception ==
An example shot when Commander Shepard (right) talks to Miranda, which has been subject to sustained commentary since the original release of Mass Effect 2. Marketing director David Silverman defended the shots, believing "her curves and sexuality" to be key aspects of her character.

Miranda received a mostly positive reception, and is a popular subject for fan art and cosplay. BioWare revealed that Miranda's loyalty mission, which had a more "a touchy-feely" plot, was completed more than Grunt's on PC, but in the case of Xbox 360 players it was the opposite. Strahovski was nominated for "Best Performance by a Human Female" in the Spike Video Game Awards. Upon hearing news for a potential Mass Effect film, Dan Ryckert of Game Informer looked at the different characters and felt Strahovski should reprise the role, calling her the "obvious choice". A reader's poll published by PC Gamer in 2015 revealed that Miranda is the second most popular love interest for Shepard after Liara T'Soni in the Mass Effect series. In a 2016 article, PC Gamer ranked Miranda the eighth best companion of the Mass Effect series. On the character's story arc, PC Gamer staff member provided the following comments: "Miranda's experience of genetic enhancements links back to her complicated relationship with her father, which is more closely and brutally examined in Mass Effect 3. This personal crisis makes her one of the series' more complex characters, in my opinion, offering some clear motivations for why she is the way she is".

Attention was given to her looks. Complex listed her buttocks as one of the best in gaming, commenting "Miranda is lethal, brilliant and looks just as hot running into battle as she does walking away from it". Complex also included her at number 40 in a list of the 50 hottest video game characters, and included her as one of 25 "best-looking sideline chicks in games". UGO.com similarly listed the character as the "ninth-hottest fictional woman of 2012", calling her a "sultry brunette". MSN listed Miranda as one of the hottest women in video game history, commenting "Genetically designed to be 'perfect', Miranda Lawson knows she's hot, intelligent, and is not afraid to tell anyone about it.".

However, 1UP.com's Ryan Winterhalter called Miranda one of three areas where Mass Effect 2 was sexist, finding not fault with her concept as a genetically perfect woman, but mainly with the camera's focus on her buttocks. Michael Graff from Screenrant was in agreement, ranking it one of the Mass Effect series' most cringe-inducing moments. Soha Kareem, in her essay "Mashing Our Buttons: On Romance And Sex In Video Games" published in The Secret Loves of Geek Girls: Expanded Edition, criticized Miranda as a "boring femme fatale type whose screen time includes opportunistic angles on her ass" and who mistreats other female characters like Jack. She further alleged that the character is "pretentious", "a product of wealth and masculine power structures", and that Miranda "would write the space version of Sheryl Sandberg's Lean In." Luke Plunkett from Kotaku criticized her romance subplot arc in Mass Effect 3, noting that "The pathetic way in which the relationship, such a cornerstone of the second game, was given such short shrift was in hindsight a blessing" in response to Miranda's change of characterization. Evan Lahti from PC Gamer compared Miranda to furniture and commented, "What do we remember about her, other than her skintight bodysuit and the way Mass Effect 2's camera suggestively frames her hips?"

Paul Tamburro from Game Revolution commented that BioWare's decision to remove what he described as "gratuitous butt shots" for the 2021 Mass Effect: Legendary Edition compilation has prompted allegations of censorship from certain players.
