= Mass Effect Galaxy =

2009 video game

- Developer: BioWare
- Publisher: Microsoft Game Studios
- Producer: Casey Hudson
- Designer: Kevin Barrett
- Series: Mass Effect
- Engine: Torque
- Platform: iOS
- Release: June 23, 2009
- Genre: Action role-playing
- Mode: Single-player

Mass Effect Galaxy was a mobile game for iOS developed by BioWare and published by Microsoft Game Studios. Galaxy follows former Systems Alliance soldier Jacob Taylor as he works with his colleague Miranda Lawson and other allies to foil a terrorist conspiracy against the Citadel Council, an executive committee consisting of several politically dominant species who hold great sway in the galaxy and are recognized as an authority by most of explored space. Both Jacob and Miranda would later appear as recurring characters in the science fiction action role-playing video game series Mass Effect, most notably as companion characters in Mass Effect 2, where they are revealed to be members of the anthropocentric paramilitary organization, Cerberus.

A spin-off tie-in prequel to Mass Effect 2, Galaxy was released on June 22, 2009. It received mediocre reviews from video game journalists, who criticized the controls and uninspired gameplay. The game had been removed from the Apple Store and is no longer available for purchase.

== Gameplay ==
Mass Effect Galaxy has been described as a "top-down shooter" and contained about two hours of gameplay. Players assume direct control of Jacob Taylor by tilting the iPod Touch or iPhone, and firing is done automatically. The game is played from a top-down perspective and the levels become more maze-like as the player progresses. Enemies can be locked on to, and additional moves can be performed by pressing buttons on the heads-up-display. It is possible to use Jacob's Biotic stasis ability to freeze enemies in place, or use an omni-tool to Sabotage enemy shields. Finally, Jacob can fire a missile that can take out multiple enemies within its blast radius. Conversations are depicted in comic book style panels and there are some opportunities for multiple-choice dialogue. Cutscenes are shown via animated comic book panels.

According to BioWare, it is not necessary to play Galaxy in order to understand or enjoy Mass Effect 2, much like the companion novels released as part the expanded media of Mass Effect.

Galaxy was removed from the iOS App Store as of 2012 and is no longer available for purchase.

== Plot ==
Jacob Taylor is on vacation aboard a cruise ship when it is suddenly boarded by batarians, a four-eyed humanoid species who are often hostile to humanity. Jacob fights off the batarian pirates and travels to the Citadel to meet his former commanding officer, Major Derek Izunami. Taylor's trip coincides with the arrival of an ambassador from the Batarian Hegemony, Jath'Amon, who is due to meet the Citadel Council for peace talks. Izunami asks Jacob to investigate the batarians in the Terminus Systems.

When Jacob arrives at the Nemean Abyss to meet an informant named Miranda Lawson, he is forced to deal with human pirates who have taken over a local space station. Once he has dealt with the pirate leader "Black Eye" Clint Darragh, Miranda offers to cooperate with Jacob and gives him three leads to investigate: a turian arms smuggler named Illo Nazario who is hiding on Tortuga; the raising of a batarian army on the planet Bekke, which is a departure from their conventional tactics of forming small terrorist cells; and reports of human doctors and scientists being kidnapped by the batarians and being taken to the Ahn'Kedar Orbital Platform.

Jacob discovers a large stash of Element Zero on Bekke, rescues the asari scientist Batha with the help of a krogan mercenary named Nax at Ahn'Kedar, and infiltrates Illo's base using a passcode given by Ish, a salarian contact of Miranda's. After confronting Illo and learning of his illness, Jacob deduce that the batarians are working on a biologically engineered disease and Illo was used by the batarians as a test subject. Batha synthesizes a vaccine which could neutralize the biological weapon; after being cured of the disease, Illo reveals that the batarians intend to unleash it on the Citadel Council through Jath'Amon, who has the vaccine.

Jacob and Miranda hurry to the Citadel where they foil the batarian plot and save the Council. Jath'Amon swears vengeance against Jacob and the human race and is escorted out by Citadel Security. Jacob goes on another vacation and is surprised when Miranda brings a bottle of champagne along to join him.

== Reception ==
Reception

Review scores
Publication	Score
IGN	5/10
Pocket Gamer	2.5/5
VideoGamer.com	5/10

IGN scored Mass Effect Galaxy 5.0/10, calling the game rushed, with "clumsy controls and repetitive action." The different art style of the game was noted as one of the game's positive points, but the animations were "weak," and layout of the game was criticized as "uninteresting." The reviewer concluded by advising readers to "Avoid this uninspired, un-fun game."

Tracy Erickson from Pocketgamer thought the title was an "uninspired spin off" which was "light years from enjoyable". Their review concluded: "Like a black hole, inferior tilt-based action and forfeiture of the series' role-playing legacy devour expectations of a worthy extension to this lauded galactic epic." It was given a 2.5/5 rating.

Chris Holt from MacWorld compared Mass Effect Galaxy to the unpopular Star Wars Holiday Special. Holt described it as "rushed, flawed, and pretty much just a poorly realized imitation" of one of publisher Electronic Arts' most well regarded intellectual properties.
