= Sherrie Inness =

American academic writer

Sherrie A. Inness (March 16, 1965 - August 11, 2014) was an American professor, literary scholar, and author. Her academic works focused on gender roles in American culture, specifically women in pop culture and literature.

== Early life and education ==
Inness grew up in California. She earned her PhD at the University of California, San Diego.

== Career ==
Inness was an assistant professor of English at Miami University of Ohio, where she began her tenure in 1993. She had authored or edited eleven books. Many of her books are about gender and American culture.

In 1998, Inness's book The Lesbian Menace was a finalist for the Judy Grahn Award, a non-fiction award celebrating books relevant ot the lesbian community.

== Bibliography ==
=== Authored ===
- Intimate Communities: Representation and Social Transformation in Women's College Fiction, 1895-1910 (1995)Bowling Green State University Popular Press
- The Lesbian Menace: Ideology, Identity, and the Representation of Lesbian Life (1997) University of Massachusetts Press
- Tough Girls: Women, Popular Culture, and the Gendering of Toughness (1999) University of Pennsylvania Press
- Secret Ingredients: Race, Gender, and Class at the Dinner Table (2006) Palgrave Macmillan

=== Edited ===
- Nancy Drew And Company: Culture, Gender, And Girls Series (1997) Bowling Green State University Popular Press
- Breaking Boundaries: New Perspectives On Women's Regional Writing (1997) University of Iowa Press
- Delinquents & Debutantes: Twentieth-Centurry American Girls' Cultures (1998) New York University Press
- Millennium Girls: Today's Girls Around The World (1998) Rowman & Littlefield
- Running For Their Lives: Girls, Cultural Identity, And Stories Of Survival. (2000) Rowman & Littlefield
- Dinner Roles: American Women and Culinary Culture (2001) University of Iowa Press
- Disco Divas: Women and Popular Culture in the 1970s (2003) University of Pennsylvania Press

== Personal life ==
Inness was a fan of Xena.

She died on August 11, 2014, after a long battle with Huntington's Disease.
