= Yvonne Strahovski =

Australian actress (born 1982)

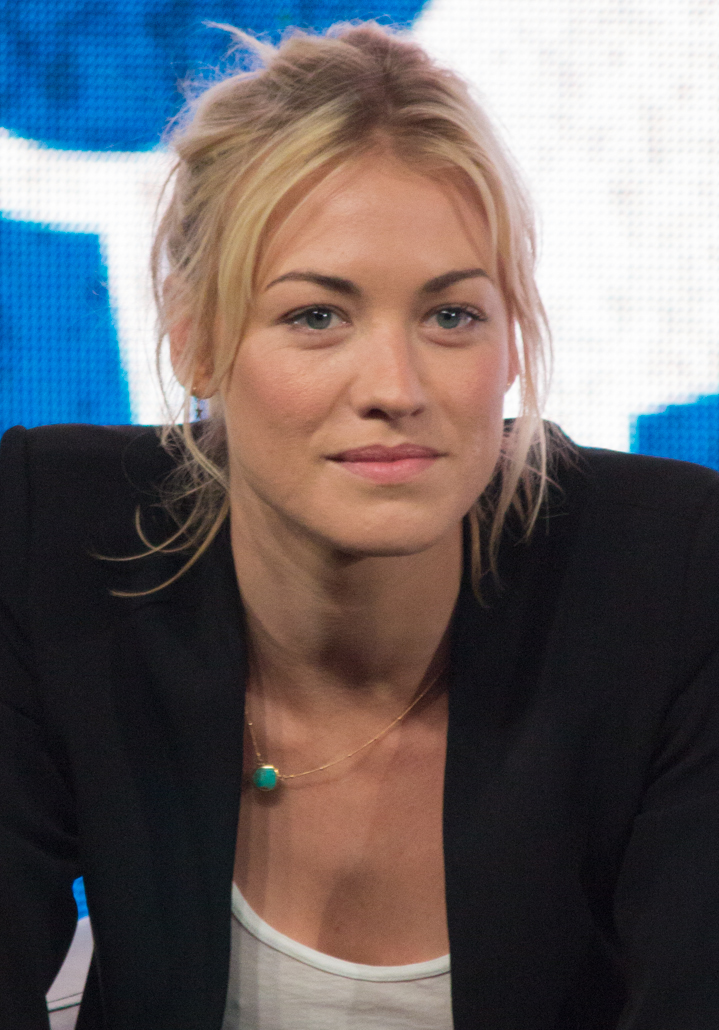
- Strahovski in 2014
- Born: Yvonne Jaqueline Strzechowski; 30 July 1982 (age 44); Sydney, Australia
- Education: University of Western Sydney (BA)
- Occupation: Actress
- Years active: 2004–present
- Spouse: Tim Loden (m. 2017)
- Children: 3

Yvonne Jaqueline Strzechowski (Note: Polish pronunciation: [iˈvɔn ˈdʐaklin stʂɛˈxɔfskʲi]; Polish: Strzechowska [stʂɛˈxɔfska]) (born 30 July 1982), known professionally as Yvonne Strahovski (/strəˈhɒvski/), is an Australian actress. She is known for her roles as Sarah Walker in the spy series Chuck (2007–2012), Hannah McKay in the crime series Dexter (2012–2013), and Kate Morgan in the event series 24: Live Another Day (2014). She earned critical acclaim for her performance in the dystopian series The Handmaid's Tale (2017–2025), for which she was nominated for a Golden Globe Award, two Primetime Emmy Awards, and three Screen Actors Guild Awards.

Her other notable works include Lego: The Adventures of Clutch Powers (2010), The Guilt Trip (2012), Killer Elite (2011), I, Frankenstein (2014), The Astronaut Wives Club (2015), Manhattan Night (2016), All I See Is You (2016), He's Out There (2018), The Predator (2018), and The Tomorrow War (2021). She voiced Miranda Lawson in the Mass Effect video game series and Batwoman in the animated superhero film Batman: Bad Blood (2016).

== Early life and education ==
Strahovski was born Yvonne Jaqueline Strzechowski on 30 July 1982 in Werrington Downs, a suburb of Sydney, New South Wales, Australia. She is the only child of Bożena, a lab technician, and Peter Strzechowski, an electronics engineer. Her parents are Polish emigrants from Tomaszów Mazowiecki.

The family moved to the suburb of Bass Hill when Strahovski was five years old; later, they moved to the coastal suburb of Maroubra. Strahovski began acting lessons at the age of 12. Straight after high school, she went to the University of Western Sydney's Theatre Nepean, where she graduated with a Bachelor of Arts degree in performance in 2003. Strahovski then worked professionally in theatre in Australia for three years before landing a role in the American television series Chuck.

== Career ==
Strahovski about the beginning of her acting career

Strahovski started acting at school when she played Viola in the school production of Twelfth Night. She appeared in film and television roles in Australia, including a turn on satirical show Double the Fist and as Freya Lewis in the Australian drama series headLand. She has also appeared in Channel Nine's Sea Patrol.

Strahovski sent in her audition tape for the TV series Chuck while in the United States auditioning for roles in other shows, namely NBC's 2007 series Bionic Woman. She was cast as Sarah Walker after running lines with Zachary Levi. She relocated to the United States six months later. Strahovski adopted the more phonetic spelling of Strahovski as her stage name in place of Strzechowski at this time.

In addition to English, Strahovski is fluent in Polish, and employed it in a brief exchange with a colleague in the Chuck episode "Chuck Versus the Wookiee" and again in the episodes "Chuck Versus the Three Words" and "Chuck Versus the Honeymooners". Although she portrays an American in the series, she briefly spoke in a "Hollywood" Australian accent in the episode "Chuck Versus the Ex".

Strahovski appears in Mass Effect Galaxy, Mass Effect 2, and Mass Effect 3 as the voice of Miranda Lawson. She had her face scanned and animated so she could portray Lawson in Mass Effect 2.

Strahovski voices Aya Brea in the English version of the Parasite Eve spinoff, The 3rd Birthday. She appeared in a CollegeHumor sketch in April 2011, parodying the music styles of Katy Perry, Ke$ha, Lady Gaga, and Justin Bieber.

Strahovski appeared in the 2011 film Killer Elite, alongside Jason Statham, Clive Owen, and Robert De Niro. She appeared in the 2012 comedy The Guilt Trip, opposite Seth Rogen and Barbra Streisand.

In 2010, Strahovski received the Teen Choice Award for Choice Action TV Actress for Chuck, as well as a nomination for Spike Video Game Awards for Best Performance by a Human Female for Mass Effect 2. In 2011, Strahovski was nominated again for the Teen Choice Awards for Choice Action TV Actress. In 2011, Cosmopolitan Magazine (Australia) named Strahovski the Fun Fearless Female of the Year, along with Favorite TV Actress.

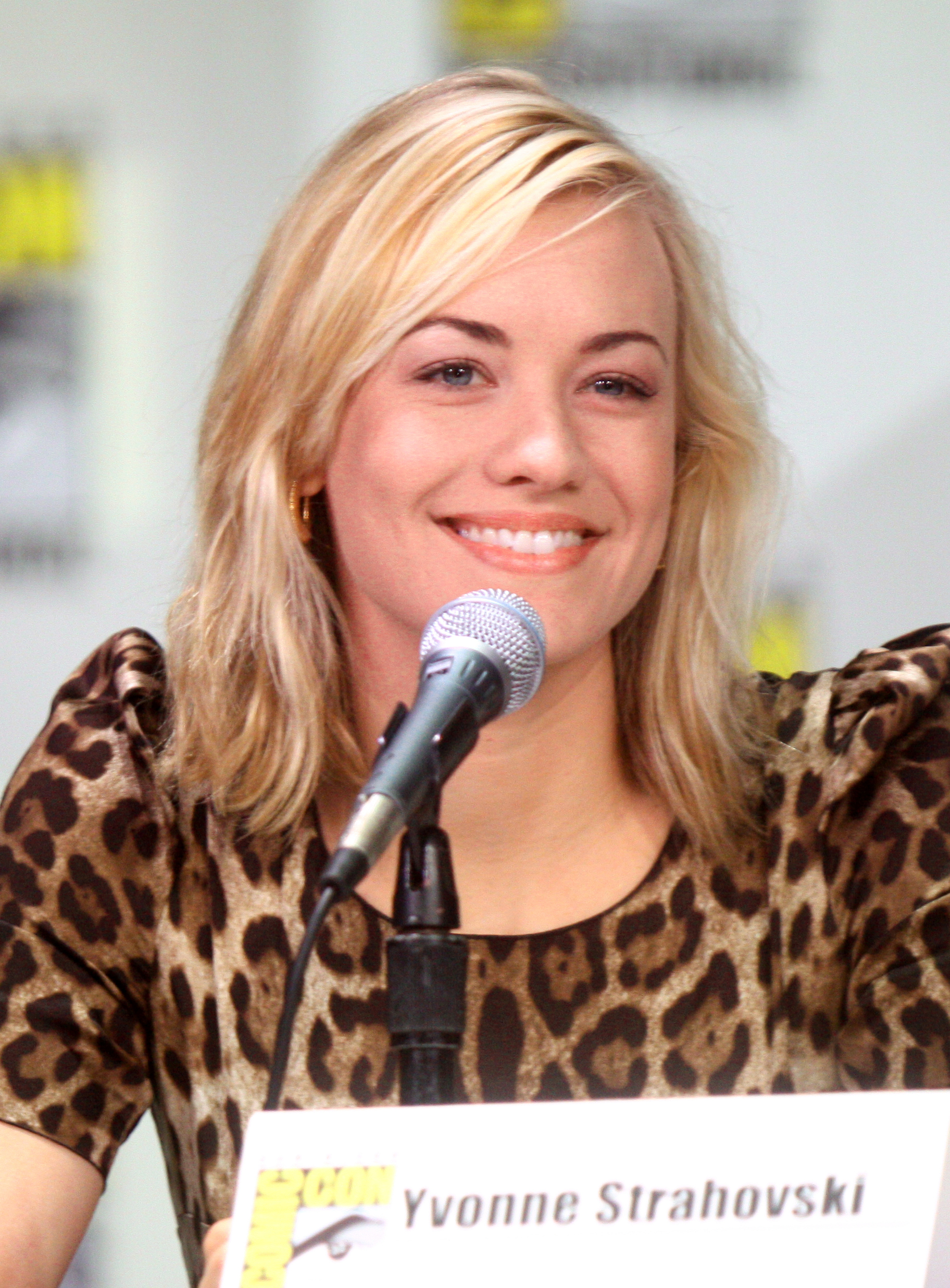
Strahovski at the 2011 San Diego Comic-Con

In November 2011, Strahovski was cast as the female lead in I, Frankenstein (2014). In March 2012, she featured in a new SoBe Life commercial. In May 2012, Strahovski ranked No. 35 in Maxim Hot 100. In June 2012, Showtime announced Strahovski had joined the cast for the seventh season of Dexter portraying Hannah McKay, a woman involved with an investigation following the death of her former lover, a spree killer whom she accompanied when she was a teenager. She reprised the role in the eighth season of Dexter.

In December 2012, she made her Broadway debut in a revival of Clifford Odets' Golden Boy, for which she won a Theatre World Award. Strahovski was honored along with Liam Hemsworth for their work in international roles with the 2012 Australians in Film Breakthrough Award.

In 2014, Strahovski joined Fox's TV series 24: Live Another Day cast as Kate Morgan, CIA agent. Later that year, she was cast as Rene Carpenter on the ABC limited series The Astronaut Wives Club. In 2016, she starred, along with Adrien Brody, as Caroline Crowley in the film noir Manhattan Night. She was featured in Maxim Hot 100 from 2009 to 2013.

Strahovski starred as Serena Joy Waterford in all six seasons of the acclaimed Hulu drama series The Handmaid's Tale, which ran from 2017 to 2025. For her performance, she earned Primetime Emmy Award nominations for Outstanding Supporting Actress in a Drama Series in 2018 and 2021. She also starred as Sofie Werner in the limited series Stateless (2020).

In 2025, Strahovski joined the cast of the The Legend of Zelda live-action film.

== Personal life ==
At the 69th Primetime Emmy Awards in 2017, Strahovski revealed that she had married Tim Loden, her partner of six years. The couple have three sons, born in 2018, 2021 and 2023.

== Filmography ==
=== Film ===
Year	Title	Role	Notes
2007	Gone	Sondra	
2008	The Plex	Sarah	
2009	Persons of Interest	Lara	Short film
2009	The Canyon	Lori Conway	
2010	I Love You Too	Alice	
2010	Matching Jack	Veronica	
2010	Lego: The Adventures of Clutch Powers	Peg Mooring	Voice
2011	Killer Elite	Anne Frazier	
2012	Koala Kid	Miranda	Voice
2012	The Guilt Trip	Jessica	
2014	I, Frankenstein	Dr. Terra Wade	
2016	Batman: Bad Blood	Kate Kane / Batwoman	Voice
2016	Manhattan Night	Caroline Crowley	
2016	All I See Is You	Karen	
2018	He's Out There	Laura	
2018	The Predator	Emily McKenna	
2019	Angel of Mine	Claire	
2021	The Tomorrow War	Colonel Muri Forester	
2023	Scrambled	Sara	
2027	The Legend of Zelda	TBA	Post-production

=== Television ===
Year	Title	Role	Notes
2004	Double the Fist	Suzie	Episode: "Fear Factory"
2005–2006	headLand	Freya Lewis	33 episodes
2006	BlackJack: Dead Memory	Belinda	Television movie
2007	Sea Patrol	Martina Royce	Episode: "Cometh the Hour"
2007–2012	Chuck	CIA Agent Sarah Walker	Main role (91 episodes)
2012–2013	Dexter	Hannah McKay	Recurring role (17 episodes)
2014	Louie	Blake	Episode: "Model"
2014	24: Live Another Day	CIA Agent Kate Morgan	Main role (12 episodes)
2015	The Astronaut Wives Club	Rene Carpenter	Main role (10 episodes)
2015	Edge	Beth	Pilot
2017–2025	The Handmaid's Tale	Serena Joy Waterford / Wharton	Main role (56 episodes)
2018	Rapunzel's Tangled Adventure	Stalyan (voice)	2 episodes
2020	Stateless	Sofie Werner	6 episodes
2024	Teacup	Maggie Chenoweth	Main role (8 episodes)
2026	Bad Monkey		

=== Theatre ===
Year	Title	Role	Venue
2005	Kieslowski's Neck	Ivanka	Courthouse Hotel Theatre
2006	Finn City		Darlinghurst Theatre
2012	Golden Boy	Lorna Moon	Belasco Theatre, Broadway
2027	Three Days of Rain	Nan/Lina	Broadway

=== Video games ===
Year	Title	Voice role	Notes
2009	Mass Effect Galaxy	Miranda Lawson	
2010	Mass Effect 2	Miranda Lawson	Also likeness
2011	The 3rd Birthday	Aya Brea	English dub
2012	Mass Effect 3	Miranda Lawson	Also likeness

=== Web ===
Year	Title	Role	Notes
2011	Three Pop Stars, One Song	Katy Perry, Lady Gaga, Ke$ha and Justin Bieber	CollegeHumor YouTube video
2015	Princess Rap Battle	Daenerys Targaryen	YouTube video series; 1 episode

== Awards and nominations ==
Year	Award	Category	Work	Result	Ref.
2010	Teen Choice Awards	Teen Choice Award for Choice TV Actress – Action	Chuck	Won	
2011	TV Guide Awards	TV Guide Award for Favorite Actress	Chuck	Won	
2011	TV Guide Awards	TV Guide Award for Favorite Couple Who Have (Shared with Zachary Levi)	Chuck	Won	
2011	Teen Choice Awards	Teen Choice Award for Choice TV Actress – Action	Chuck	Nominated	
2012	Teen Choice Awards	Teen Choice Award for Choice TV Actress – Action	Chuck	Nominated	
2013	Saturn Award	Saturn Award for Best Guest Starring Role on Television	Dexter	Won	
2018	Screen Actors Guild Awards	Outstanding Performance by an Ensemble in a Drama Series	The Handmaid's Tale	Nominated	
2018	Primetime Emmy Awards	Outstanding Supporting Actress in a Drama Series	The Handmaid's Tale	Nominated	
2019	Golden Globe Awards	Best Supporting Actress – Series, Miniseries or Television Film	The Handmaid's Tale	Nominated	
2019	Critics' Choice Awards	Best Supporting Actress in a Drama Series	The Handmaid's Tale	Nominated	
2019	Screen Actors Guild Awards	Outstanding Performance by an Ensemble in a Drama Series	The Handmaid's Tale	Nominated	
2020	Screen Actors Guild Awards	Outstanding Performance by an Ensemble in a Drama Series	The Handmaid's Tale	Nominated	
2020	AACTA Awards	Best Lead Actress in a Television Drama	Stateless	Won	
2021	Primetime Emmy Awards	Outstanding Supporting Actress in a Drama Series	The Handmaid's Tale	Nominated	

== See also ==
- List of Australian film actors
