= Scary World =

Studio album by Night Club
- Released: August 24, 2018
- Recorded: 2018
- Length: 30:32
- Label: Gato Blanco
- Producer: The 3 Kord Scissor King

Night Club chronology
Requiem for Romance (2016)	Scary World (2018)	Die Die Lullaby (2021)

Singles from Night Club
- 1. "Candy Coated Suicide" Released: May 18, 2018; 2. "Schizophrenic" Released: October 31, 2018; 3. "Your Addiction" Released: June 17, 2019

Scary World is the second studio album by American electronic band Night Club. It was released on August 24, 2018, by Gato Blanco Records and produced by Mark Brooks under the moniker The 3 Kord Scissor King. The LP debuted at #4 US, #8 UK and #11 Sweden on the iTunes electronic charts upon release. Electrozombies named "Scary World" #2 on their best albums of 2018. The song "Scary World" was included in The Electricity Club's 30 Songs of 2018.

== Track listing ==
All lyrics are written by Mark Brooks and Emily Kavanaugh.

Scary World track listing
No.	Title	Length
1.	"Beware!"	1:24
2.	"Scary World"	3:10
3.	"Schizophrenic"	3:07
4.	"Your Addiction"	3:31
5.	"Blood on Your Blade"	3:07
6.	"Candy Coated Suicide"	3:30
7.	"Therapy (Get High)"	2:48
8.	"Imaginary Friend"	3:10
9.	"Vampires"	3:33
10.	"Survive"	4:32
Total length:		30:32
