= Night Club (band) =

American electronic band from Los Angeles

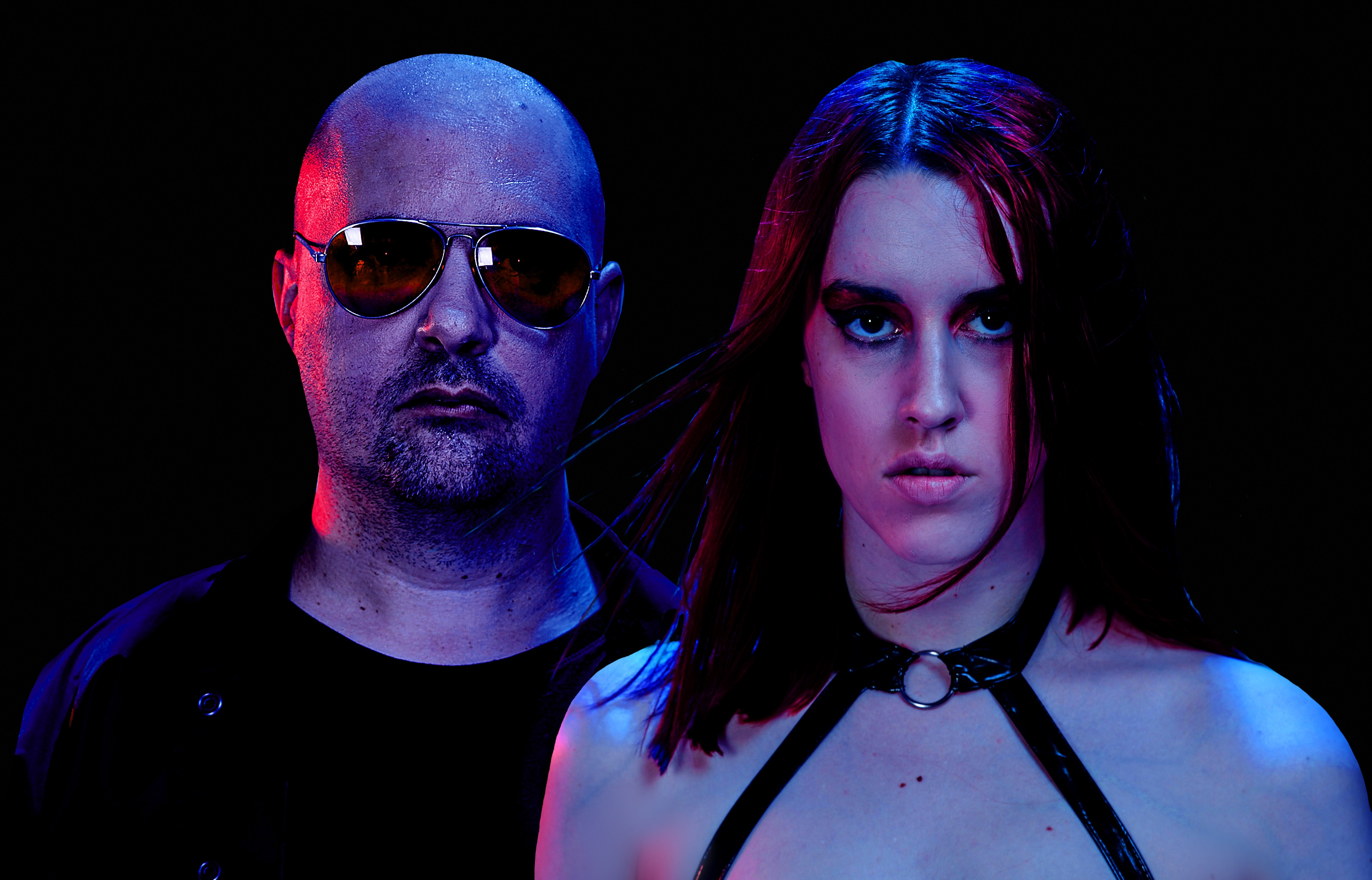
- Mark Brooks and Emily Kavanaugh

Background information
- Origin: Los Angeles, California, United States
- Genres: Synth-pop; electropop; darkwave; synthwave
- Years active: 2012–present
- Label: Gato Blanco / AWAL
- Members: Mark Brooks; Emily Kavanaugh
- Website: www.nightclubband.com

Night Club is an American electronic band, formed by keyboardist Mark Brooks (a.k.a. 3 Kord Scissor King) and singer Emily Kavanaugh in 2012. The band is from Los Angeles, California.

== Career ==
Night Club released their first single "Lovestruck" in July 2012 and their self-titled debut EP in September 2012. A video for "Lovestruck" was released in September 2012 in conjunction with the release of the EP. Night Club's radio debut occurred on KROQ DJ Rodney Bingenheimer's Rodney on the Roq program on October 22, 2012. Night Club released a video for their second single "Control" in February 2013.

Night Club released their second EP Love Casualty in June 2013. In conjunction with the EP release, the band released three videos: "Poisonous", "Strobe Light" and "Give Yourself Up".

Night Club released their third EP Black Leather Heart in September 2014. In conjunction with the EP release, the band released three videos: "Need You Tonight", "She Wants To Play With Fire" and "Not In Love".

In 2013, Night Club composed the music for the Comedy Central television pilot Moonbeam City featuring Rob Lowe. The show was picked up for a first season in 2014 and the band composed the music for all ten episodes. "Moonbeam City" aired in late 2015. Milan Records released the official soundtrack for Moonbeam City in November 2015.

In 2015, Night Club composed the music for the feature film Nerdland which was directed by Chris Prynoski and written by Andrew Kevin Walker. The film features Paul Rudd, Patton Oswalt, Kate Micucci, Riki Lindhome, Hannibal Buress, Mike Judge and Paul Scheer. The film was released theatrically on December 6, 2016. The official soundtrack was released by Gato Blanco on the same day.

The band released their first LP, Requiem for Romance, in October 2016. The videos for "Bad Girl", "Dear Enemy" and "Show It 2 Me" were released in conjunction with the album. The LP reached #2 on the CMJ RPM chart and was voted best non-metal album by Metal Injection in 2016.

The band's second LP, Scary World, was released in August 2018. The videos for "Candy Coated Suicide", "Schizophrenic" and "Your Addiction" were released in conjunction with the album. The LP debuted at #4 US, #8 UK and #11 Sweden on the iTunes electronic charts upon release. Electrozombies named "Scary World" #2 on their best albums of 2018. The song "Scary World" was included in The Electricity Club's 30 Songs of 2018. MXDWN named Night Club "Best New Artist of 2018".

The band's third LP, Die Die Lullaby, was released in October 2020 and was co-mixed by Dave "Rave" Ogilvie. The first single "Miss Negativity" was accompanied by a music video featuring Kavanaugh as a pageant performer, with references to the film Carrie. The videos for "Gossip" and "Die in the Disco" were released in conjunction with the album. The LP debuted at #1 on the US iTunes electronic chart upon release.

The band's fourth LP, Masochist, was released on March 15, 2024. It opens with "Gone" featuring Maynard James Keenan of Tool, A Perfect Circle, and Puscifer, the latter two Night Club opened for on their 2018 and 2023 tours, respectively. The album includes a cover of Fun Boy Three's "The Lunatics (Have Taken Over the Asylum)". This is the second album co-mixed by Dave Ogilvie. The videos for "Crime Scene" and "Barbwire Kiss" were released in conjunction with the album. The LP also debuted at #1 on the US iTunes electronic chart upon release.

== Discography ==
=== Studio albums ===
- Requiem for Romance (2016)
- Scary World (2018)
- Die Die Lullaby (2020)
- Masochist (2024)

=== Soundtrack albums ===
- Moonbeam City Official Soundtrack (2015)

=== EPs ===
- Night Club (2012)
- Love Casualty (2013)
- Black Leather Heart (2014)

=== Singles ===
- Lovestruck (2012)
- Poisonous (2013)
- Need You Tonight (2014)
- Bad Girl (2016)
- Candy Coated Suicide (2018)
- Your Addiction (2018)
- Miss Negativity (2020)
- Gossip (2020)
- Crime Scene (2024)
- Barbwire Kiss (2024)

=== Music videos ===
- "Lovestruck" (2012)
- "Control" (2013)
- "Poisonous" (2013)
- "Strobe Light" (2013)
- "Need You Tonight" (2014)
- "She Wants To Play With Fire" (2014)
- "Not In Love" (2014)
- "Give Yourself Up" (2015)
- "Bad Girl" (2016)
- "Dear Enemy" (2016)
- "Show It 2 Me" (2017)
- "Candy Coated Suicide" (2018)
- "Schizophrenic" (2018)
- "Your Addiction" (2019)
- "Miss Negativity" (2020)
- "Gossip" (2020)
- "Die in the Disco" (2022)
- "Crime Scene" (2024)
- "Barbwire Kiss" (2024)
