= B in the Mix: The Remixes Vol. 2 =

2011 remix album by Britney Spears

Remix album by Britney Spears
- Released: October 7, 2011
- Recorded: 2004–2011
- Genres: Dance-pop; disco; electro; house; techno
- Length: 56:11
- Labels: RCA; Jive
- Producers: Max Martin; Danja; Dr. Luke; Tiësto; Bloodshy & Avant; Shellback; Benny Benassi; The Clutch; Billboard; Kaskade; Chris Smith; Philip Larsen; Gareth Emery; Linus Loves; K. Briscoe

Britney Spears chronology
Femme Fatale (2011)	B in the Mix: The Remixes Vol. 2 (2011)	Oops! I Did It Again: The Best of Britney Spears (2012)

B in the Mix: The Remixes Vol. 2 is the second remix album by American singer Britney Spears. The follow-up to B in the Mix: The Remixes (2005), it was released on October 7, 2011 by Jive Records. On September 9, 2011, Spears announced the release by posting the cover artwork and track listing on her Tumblr account. The album includes remixes of various tracks from her studio albums Blackout (2007), Circus (2008) and Femme Fatale (2011), as well as a remix of "3" and, exclusively in Japan, a remix of "My Prerogative". The remixes were done by disc jockeys such as Kaskade, Tiësto and Benny Benassi. The music was influenced by various subgenres of pop music, such as disco and house. The album was released the same day RCA absorbed Jive Records.

B in the Mix: The Remixes Vol. 2 received generally favorable reviews from music critics. Some reviewers considered the album more creative when compared to studio albums Blackout and Circus and praised several remixes, despite noting that most of the songs lost their "magic" in a remixed form. B in the Mix: The Remixes Vol. 2 achieved moderate success worldwide, reaching top-ten positions in Argentina and South Korea, while peaking at number four on the US Dance/Electronic Albums and number nine on the UK Dance Albums, also peaking at number forty-seven on the US Billboard 200.

== Music ==
"Womanizer (Benny Benassi Extended)"
A 30-second sample of the remix, where Spears' vocals contrasts with the trance influenced background.

The album opens with the radio mix of "Criminal", a guitar-driven mid tempo song, which incorporates a folk-style flute melody. Erin Thompson of the Seattle Weekly said the song "takes a breather from aggressive, wall-to-wall synths, driven instead by a steady guitar rhythm and an oddly Asian folky-sounding flute melody." The beat was compared by Keith Caufield of Billboard to Madonna's "Don't Tell Me" (2000). The Kaskade remix of "Gimme More" follows as the second track; the record producer said that it was a challenge to make the song good in his house musical style, commenting: "I wanted to make sure that it would be something that would eventually fit into my live set. That is the true test for me: Taking a huge pop vocal and making it work with my music can be a little tricky, but I find the challenge fun." The Tiësto remix of "Piece of Me" was described as "timeless". He said: "the melody, the atmosphere [of the remix] is totally different than the original. For me, it's always been a special remix. I'm glad they added that on the album." Kaskade also commented that the remix album "shines a new light on the EDM scene and how far it can reach." Cobra Starship's Alex Suarez remixed "Till the World Ends". Suarez commented that he didn't want to distant the remix structure from the original version, and noted, "the thing with a Britney Spears remix is people like to sing along." "Womanizer" was remixed in a techno form by Benny Benassi, while U-Tern's "If U Seek Amy" remix is influenced by disco music.

== Artwork ==
On September 2, 2011, Sony Japan posted the cover artwork of B in the Mix: The Remixes 2, along with the announcement that it would feature unreleased tracks. The cover art for the album features Spears smirking with hair in her face behind a butterfly, while wearing a silk outfit. Amy Sciarretto of PopCrush said that although the cover resembled that of B in the Mix: The Remixes, it is "a somewhat unflattering shot of the normally gorgeous star." On September 9, 2011, Spears posted the official cover artwork and track listing for B in the Mix: The Remixes Vol. 2 on her Tumblr account.

== Release ==
In November 2005, Spears released her first remix album, B in the Mix: The Remixes. During the next six years, she released three studio albums: Blackout (2007), Circus (2008) and Femme Fatale (2011). Website Fragrantica.com reported that Spears' new fragrance Cosmic Radiance could "be expected with launch of new remix album" by Spears in August 2011. On September 9, 2011, Spears posted the official cover artwork and track listing for B in the Mix: The Remixes Vol. 2 on her Tumblr account. The track listing included remixes of three tracks from each of her last three studio albums, as well as a remix of "3" from The Singles Collection (2009). However, the Varsity Team remix of "Criminal" was removed from most editions before the album's release and replaced with the radio mix.

== Critical reception ==
Professional ratings
Review scores
Source	Rating
Allmusic	3/5 stars

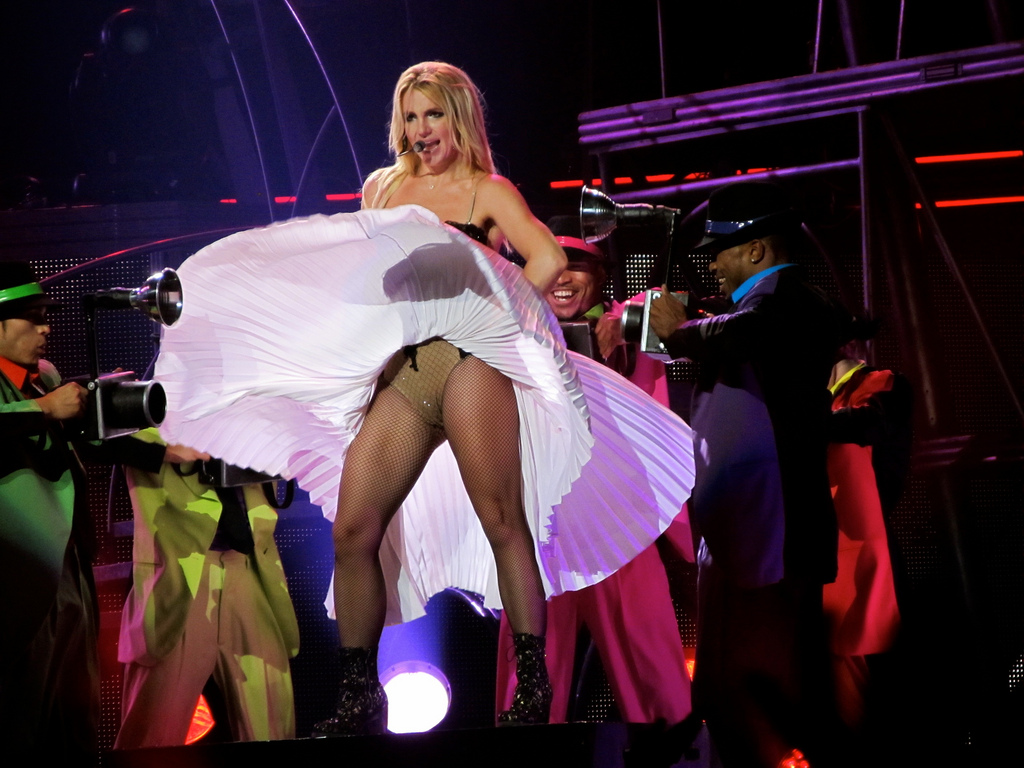
Spears performing "If U Seek Amy" at the Femme Fatale Tour, 2011

After its release, B in the Mix: The Remixes Vol. 2 received generally favorable reviews from contemporary music critics. Stephen Thomas Erlewine of AllMusic commented that a "clutch of DJs and remixers, primarily European, have been hired and they’ve run wild, taking the original versions as merely suggestions, something that's entirely appropriate in this case." He also noted that "the variations are quite far removed from the original — U-Tern's spangly disco spin on "If U Seek Amy" is a decided improvement — and while nothing can save a lousy song (see "Criminal"), this collection has as much imagination and energy as either Circus or Femme Fatale." Jocelyn Vena of MTV said that, after being "chopped, screwed and broken down, the songs reach[ed] new extremes" in the remix album.

Entertainment Wise writer Shaun Kitchener gave the remix album a mixed review, saying that, with most of the remixes: "a great deal of the magic is lost", when compared to original productions, citing "Till the World Ends" and "If U Seek Amy" as the most notable examples. Jason Lipshutz of Billboard said that "among the album highlights are Manhattan Clique's club remix of "3", Gareth Emery's take on "I Wanna Go", Tiësto's club mix of "Piece of Me", and Alex Suarez's reworking of "Till the World Ends"."

== Commercial performance ==
The remix album achieved moderate success worldwide. In the United States, B in the Mix: The Remixes Vol. 2 entered the Billboard 200 at number 47, with sales of 9,000 copies, for the issue dated October 19, 2011. It also reached number four on the Dance/Electronic Albums component chart. As of 2020, it sold 30,000 units.

In the United Kingdom, the album peaked outside the top hundred, at number 171, while debuting at number nine on the Dance Albums Chart. In Canada, the remix album debuted at number 53, and peaked within the top thirty in Italy. B in the Mix: The Remixes Vol. 2 reached the top ten on South Korean Gaon Albums Chart, where it reached number seven, and on Argentine Albums Chart, where it reached number five.

== Track listing ==
B in the Mix: The Remixes Vol. 2 – Standard edition
No.	Title	Writer(s)	Producer(s)	Length
1.	"Criminal" (Radio Mix)	Shellback; Max Martin; Tiffany Amber	Max Martin; Shellback	3:45
2.	"Gimme More" (Kaskade Club Mix)	Nathaniel Hills; James Washington; Keri Hilson; Marcella Araica	Danja; Jim Beanz^{[a]}; Hilson^{[a]}; Kaskade^{[b]}	6:08
3.	"Piece of Me" (Tiësto Club Mix)	Christian Karlsson; Pontus Winnberg; Klas Åhlund	Bloodshy & Avant; Tiësto^{[b]}	7:53
4.	"Radar" (Tonal Club Remix)	Karlsson; Winnberg; Henrik Jonback; Balewa Muhammad; Candice Nelson; Ezekiel Lewis; Patrick "J. Que" Smith	Bloodshy & Avant; The Clutch^{[c]}; Alexander Lasarenko^{[b]}; Matt Pendergast^{[b]}	4:55
5.	"Womanizer" (Benny Benassi Extended)	Nikesha Briscoe; Rafael Akinyemi	K. Briscoe/The Outsyders; Benny Benassi^{[b]}	6:17
6.	"Circus" (Linus Loves Remix)	Lukasz Gottwald; Claude Kelly; Benjamin Levin	Dr. Luke; Benny Blanco; John Clark^{[b]}; Linus Loves^{[b]}	4:39
7.	"If U Seek Amy" (U-Tern Remix)	Max Martin; Shellback; Savan Kotecha; Alexander Kronlund	Max Martin; U-Tern^{[b]}	6:10
8.	"3" (Manhattan Clique Club Remix)	Max Martin; Shellback; Amber	Max Martin; Shellback; Philip Larsen^{[b]}; Chris Smith^{[b]}	5:42
9.	"Till the World Ends" (Alex Suarez Club Remix)	Gottwald; Kronlund; Max Martin; Kesha Sebert	Dr. Luke; Max Martin; Billboard; Alex Suarez^{[b]}	5:18
10.	"I Wanna Go" (Gareth Emery Remix)	Shellback; Martin; Kotecha	Max Martin; Shellback; Gareth Emery^{[b]}	5:26
Total length:				56:11

B in the Mix: The Remixes Vol. 2 – Japanese edition
No.	Title	Writer(s)	Producer(s)	Length
1.	"Gimme More" (Kaskade Club Mix)	Hills; Washington; Hilson; Araica	Danja; Beanz^{[a]}; Hilson^{[a]}; Kaskade^{[b]}	6:08
2.	"Piece of Me" (Tiësto Club Mix)	Karlsson; Winnberg; Åhlund	Bloodshy & Avant; Tiësto^{[b]}	7:53
3.	"Radar" (Tonal Club Remix)	Karlsson; Winnberg; Jonback; Muhammad; Nelson; Lewis; J. Smith	Bloodshy & Avant; The Clutch^{[c]}; Lasarenko^{[b]}; Pendergast^{[b]}	4:55
4.	"Womanizer" (Benny Benassi Extended)	Briscoe; Akinyemi	K. Briscoe/The Outsyders; Benassi^{[b]}	6:17
5.	"Circus" (Linus Loves Remix)	Gottwald; Kelly; Levin	Dr. Luke; Blanco; Clark^{[b]}; Loves^{[b]}	4:39
6.	"If U Seek Amy" (U-Tern Remix)	Martin; Shellback; Kotecha; Kronlund	Martin; U-Tern^{[b]}	6:10
7.	"3" (Manhattan Clique Club Remix)	Martin; Shellback; Amber	Martin; Shellback; Philip Larsen^{[b]}; C. Smith^{[b]}	5:42
8.	"Till the World Ends" (Alex Suarez Club Remix)	Gottwald; Kronlund; Max Martin; Sebert	Dr. Luke; Martin; Billboard; Suarez^{[b]}	5:18
9.	"I Wanna Go" (Gareth Emery Remix)	Shellback; Martin; Kotecha	Martin; Shellback; Emery^{[b]}	5:26
10.	"Criminal" (Varsity Team Extended Remix)	Shellback; Martin; Amber	Martin; Shellback; Tommy Diz^{[b]}; Adriano Clemente^{[b]}	6:34
11.	"Break the Ice" (Tonal Remix)	Hills; Washington; Hilson; Araica	Danja; Beanz^{[a]}; Lasarenko^{[b]}	4:52
12.	"Hold It Against Me" (Funk Generation Club Remix)	Martin; Gottwald; Mathieu Jomphe; Bonnie McKee	Dr. Luke; Martin; Billboard^{[c]}; Mike Rizzo^{[b]}	6:48
13.	"My Prerogative" (X-Press 2 Radio Edit)	Bobby Brown; Gene Griffin; Edward Teddy Riley	Bloodshy & Avant; X-Press 2^{[b]}	4:17
14.	"Criminal" (Tom Piper & Riddler Remix Radio Edit)	Shellback; Martin; Amber	Martin; Shellback; Rich "DJ Riddler" Pangilinan^{[b]}; Tom Piper^{[b]}	3:38
Total length:				78:52

Notes

- ^{^a} signifies a vocal producer
- ^{^b} signifies a remixer and additional producer
- ^{^c} signifies a co-producer

== Personnel ==
Credits adapted from the album's liner notes.

- Tom Coyne – mastering
- Adam Leber – management
- Larry Rudolph – management
- Jackie Murphy – art direction
- Randee St. Nicholas – photography

== Charts ==
=== Weekly charts ===
Chart (2011)	Peak position
Argentine Albums (CAPIF)	5
Belgian Albums (Ultratop Wallonia)	69
Canadian Albums (Billboard)	53
Czech Albums (ČNS IFPI)	47
French Albums (SNEP)	57
French Compilation Albums (SNEP)	15
Italian Albums (FIMI)	29
Japanese Albums (Oricon)	83
Japanese Top Albums Sales (Billboard Japan)	72
Mexican Albums (Top 100 Mexico)	27
South Korean International Albums (Gaon)	7
Spanish Albums (Promusicae)	39
UK Albums (OCC)	171
UK Dance Albums (Official Charts)	9
US Billboard 200	47
US Top Dance Albums (Billboard)	4
Venezuelan Albums (Recordland)	9

== Release history ==
Release history
Region	Date	Format(s)	Label(s)	Ref.
Austria	October 7, 2011	CD; digital download	Sony Music	
United States	October 11, 2011	CD; digital download	RCA	
Australia	October 14, 2011	CD; digital download	Sony Music	
Brazil	October 19, 2011	CD; digital download	Sony Music	
Thailand	October 19, 2011	CD; digital download	Sony Music	
Japan	November 30, 2011	CD; digital download	Sony Music	
