= Selfish (Britney Spears song) =

2011 song by Britney Spears

Song by Britney Spears

from the album Femme Fatale (deluxe edition)
- Released: March 25, 2011
- Studio: Roc The Mic Studios (New York City); Westlake Recording Studios (Los Angeles); The Bunker Studios (Paris)
- Genre: Dance-pop
- Length: 3:43
- Label: Jive
- Songwriters: Ester Dean; Mikkel S. Eriksen; Tor E. Hermansen; Sandy Wilhelm; Traci Hale
- Producers: Stargate; Sandy Vee

Audio video
- "Selfish" on YouTube

"Selfish" is a song by American singer Britney Spears from the deluxe edition of her seventh studio album, Femme Fatale (2011). It was written by Ester Dean, Traci Hale, Sandy Vee, and the production duo Stargate. The latter two also produced the song with vocal production handled by Kuk Harrell. The song received renewed interest in popularity in 2024, thirteen years after its original release, due to a campaign by fans of Spears as a response to the release of former boyfriend Justin Timberlake's identically titled single "Selfish". These efforts resulted in her song reentering the charts, charting at number five on Billboard's Digital Song Sales chart and number 12 on the Dance/Electronic Songs chart.

== Background ==
Spears released her seventh studio album Femme Fatale on March 25, 2011. The album received generally positive reviews from music critics, who praised its dance-pop style and production. "Selfish" appears as the 15th track of its parent album's deluxe edition.

Spears announced her retirement from the music industry in January 2024, three months after the release of her best-selling memoir The Woman in Me in October 2023. Spears was in a high-profile relationship with singer Justin Timberlake from 1999 to 2002. Timberlake received criticism for his treatment of Spears during and after their relationship following the release of Spears's memoir and earlier that of the 2021 documentary Framing Britney Spears.

Timberlake released a single titled "Selfish" on January 25, 2024, his first solo release since "SoulMate" in July 2018. "Selfish by Britney Spears" began trending on Twitter the day of the release of Timberlake's single, and fans of Spears posted jokingly about her song, claiming it was a "new" single release. They began a social media campaign encouraging purchasing her song on iTunes, streaming it on music streaming platforms, and urging radio stations to play it.

== Composition and reception ==
Billboard synopisized the lyrics of "Selfish" as "Spears' boy-turned-man conquest for the evening [being] virtually tied up by the diva and ordered to do her bidding" and opined the song could have appeared on the standard release of its parent album. Writing for The Times of India, Sumedha Tripathi described the song as a "sassy dance-pop anthem".

== Commercial performance ==
"Selfish" was never released as a single and failed to appear on most charts when Femme Fatale was originally released in 2011. It initially debuted at number 32 on Billboard's Dance/Electronic Digital Song Sales chart for the chart dated April 16, 2011.

On January 25, 2024, after the release of Timberlake's song, Spears' "Selfish" saw a commercial resurgence and reached number one on the iTunes chart in the United States, surpassing his song. With only one day of renewed activity following the release of his song, Spears' song re-entered the Dance/Electronic Digital Song Sales chart at number nine for the chart dated February 3, 2024. The following week, Billboard reported that Spears' song topped Timberlake's in sales during the latter's first full week of tracking. Between January 29–31, her song garnered over 397,000 official on-demand streams in the US, marking an 14,978% increase from only 2,600 streams earned between January 22–24. It also sold under 10,000 digital copies in the US between January 29–31, a drastic increase from the negligible number of copies the song sold between January 22–24. The song rose to number one on the Dance/Electronic Digital Song Sales chart dated February 10, 2024, selling just under 9,700 copies during the tracking week. It marked the singer's fifth number-one hit, 13th top-ten hit, and 24th song to appear on the chart. The song also debuted at number five on the all-genre Digital Song Sales chart and number 12 on the main Dance/Electronic Songs chart, which factors digital sales as well as streams and audience impressions.

== Personnel ==
Credits are adapted from the liner notes of Femme Fatale (deluxe edition).

- Britney Spears – lead vocals
- Mikkel S. Eriksen – all instruments, songwriter, producer, recording engineer
- Tor Erik Hermansen – all instruments, songwriter, producer, recording engineer
- Ester Dean – songwriter
- Sandy Wilhelm – all instruments, songwriter, producer, recording engineer
- Jeanette Olsson – background vocals
- Kuk Harrell – background vocals, vocal producer, vocal recording engineer
- Miles Walker – recording engineer
- Josh Gudwin – vocal recording engineer
- Serban Ghenea – mixing engineer
- Tim Roberts – assistant mixing engineer
- John Hanes – mixing engineer
- Dr. Luke – executive producer
- Max Martin – executive producer
- Tom Coyne – mastering engineer

== Charts ==
Weekly chart performance for "Selfish"
Chart (2024)	Peak position
Canadian Digital Song Sales (Billboard)	11
Germany Digital Song Sales (Official German Charts)	43
UK Singles Downloads (Official Charts)	12
UK Singles Sales (OCC)	13
US Digital Song Sales (Billboard)	5
US Hot Dance/Electronic Songs (Billboard)	12
