= Femme Fatale (Britney Spears album) =

- Standard cover (Note: Deluxe edition cover features the writing in a gold typeface.)

Studio album by Britney Spears
- Released: March 25, 2011
- Recorded: July 12, 2009 – February 8, 2011
- Studios: 2nd Floor (Los Angeles); The Bunker (Paris); Conway (Los Angeles); Downtown (New York); Dr. Luke's (Los Angeles); Ethernet (Los Angeles); Germano (New York); Lotzah Matzah (New York); Maratone (Stockholm); MyAuditonic (London); Record Plant (Los Angeles); Robotberget (Stockholm); Roc the Mic (New York); Westlake (Los Angeles)
- Genre: Dance-pop
- Length: 44:00
- Label: Jive
- Producers: Ammo; Billboard; Benny Blanco; Bloodshy; Cirkut; Dr. Luke; Rodney "Darkchild" Jerkins; JMike; Henrik Jonback; Magnus; Max Martin; Oligee; Fraser T. Smith; Sandy Vee; Shellback; Stargate; will.i.am

Britney Spears chronology
The Singles Collection (2009)	Femme Fatale (2011)	B in the Mix: The Remixes Vol. 2 (2011)

Singles from Femme Fatale
- 1. "Hold It Against Me" Released: January 10, 2011; 2. "Till the World Ends" Released: March 4, 2011; 3. "I Wanna Go" Released: June 14, 2011; 4. "Criminal" Released: September 30, 2011

Femme Fatale is the seventh studio album by American singer Britney Spears. It was released on March 25, 2011, by Jive Records, and was her last album with the label before they dissolved in October of the same year, and she was moved to RCA Records. Musically, Spears wanted to make a "fresh-sounding" and "fierce dance album", thus incorporating dance-pop, electropop, EDM and synth-pop styles with elements of dubstep, techno and electro in its sound. Spears began working on the album during the second leg of her tour The Circus Starring Britney Spears (2009), while also contributing to her second greatest hits album The Singles Collection (2009). Spears collaborated with various producers including Max Martin, Dr. Luke, Fraser T. Smith, Rodney Jerkins, Bloodshy, will.i.am, Stargate, and Travis Barker.

Upon its release, the album received generally favorable reviews from music critics, who complimented its production and dance-pop style. The album charted at number one in Australia, Canada, Mexico, Russia, South Korea and the United States, and peaked inside the top ten in 24 countries. It was certified platinum by the Recording Industry Association of America (RIAA), and as of February 2014, has sold 2.4 million copies worldwide.

Femme Fatale became Spears's most successful era on the US song charts, being her first album to score three top ten singles on the US Billboard Hot 100, with "Hold It Against Me", "Till the World Ends" and "I Wanna Go" peaking at numbers one, three and seven, respectively. The fourth and final single, "Criminal", peaked at number one in Brazil and within the top 20 in five countries. A resurgence in popularity for "Criminal" occurred when it went viral on TikTok in 2020, becoming one of her most streamed songs and fourth most liked music video on YouTube. To promote the album, Spears gave various television performances and embarked on her eighth concert tour, the Femme Fatale Tour.

== Background and development ==
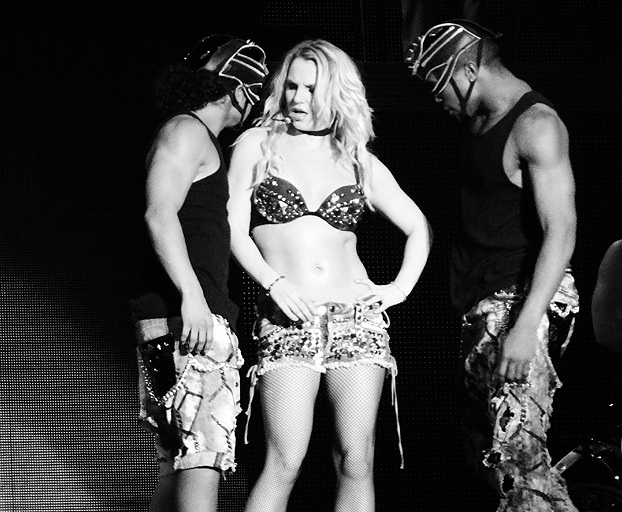
Spears performing "S&M" during the Femme Fatale Tour, 2011

On July 12, 2009, Spears confirmed through her Twitter account that she had begun recording new material, stating she was going into the studio with Swedish songwriter and producer Max Martin, while she was in Stockholm during the European leg of The Circus Starring Britney Spears. The recording sessions resulted in several album cuts as well as the song "3", which would be released as a single from Spears's second greatest hits album The Singles Collection (2009).

In June 2010, during an interview with Rap-Up, Danja commented that he was working with Spears in the pre-production of Femme Fatale. Darkchild, who was also reportedly working with her, said during a Ustream session in August 2010, "Britney fans are gonna be so happy in a few weeks", hinting about the release of new music. However, this was denied by Spears's manager Adam Leber, who stated, "No new music news right now....Wish people wouldn't mislead you guys with info. Not cool! PS- The guys that ARE working on Brit's next album ARE NOT talking about it..." Leber later spoke with Entertainment Weekly, calling the sound of the record "progressive" and "a departure from what you've heard." In November 2010, Dr. Luke announced that he would be the executive producer of the album, along with Max Martin. Spears explained in an interview with Rolling Stone that she had worked with Luke during the production of Blackout (2007), stating that he was "incredible" during that time and that his skills have improved. She also said that Martin was with her since the beginning of her career and that there is "nobody [she] feel[s] more comfortable collaborating with in the studio". On December 2, 2010, the day of her 29th birthday, Spears thanked her fans for the birthday wishes and announced, "I'm almost done with my new album and it will be coming out this March."

== Recording and production ==
In July 2009, Spears had begun recording new material with longtime collaborator Max Martin. Spears stated her desire to make the album "fresh-sounding [...] for the clubs or something that you play in your car when you're going out at night that gets you excited, but I wanted it to sound different from everything else out right now." Spears also stated that she wanted to make sure Femme Fatale was completely different from her previous studio album Circus (2008). After "Hold It Against Me" was written, originally, Luke and Martin wanted to give the track to Katy Perry, but they later decided that it wasn't the right fit for her. They continued to work on the song with Billboard, and Luke commented that before giving the song to Spears he wanted to make sure it sounded different from his previous recordings. Darkchild stated that while working with him, Spears was very "hands-on" and "had a lot of ideas for [him]." He later commented he had produced two songs for the album, with one of them featuring Travis Barker. Darkchild added that the song "[has] this rock feel which is out of the box, out of my norm, and I think it's out of her norm as well." Executive producer Dr. Luke stated that "[I feel like] Britney kind of has her own genre: If you look at songs like "Toxic" and "Piece of Me" and "Oops!... I Did It Again", they all were sort of influential and led the way [...] She wanted to keep on with that and do stuff that was 'forward-thinking', So we put some dubstep stuff in there, in bridges; snuck it in different places."

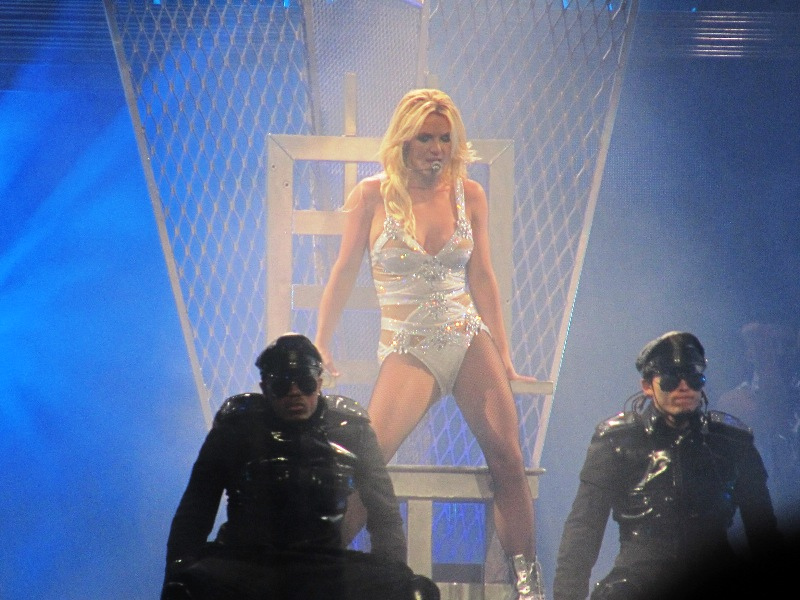
Spears performing "Hold It Against Me" during the Femme Fatale Tour, 2011

Dr. Luke revealed in February 2011 that a final track listing had not yet been chosen. Later that month, Spears worked with will.i.am. Spears later commented that she is a fan of the Black Eyed Peas, and would love to work with will.i.am again the future. She also said that she discovered Sabi through a friend recommendation, and had always wanted to feature a new artist in one of her albums, hence they recorded "(Drop Dead) Beautiful". British producer Fraser T Smith worked with Spears on three tracks and complimented her work ethic, saying that her voice was powerful and that she focused on the music. William Orbit confirmed he had co-written a track for Spears with Klas Åhlund, but it was left off the final track listing. Orbit stated that he was displeased with the decision, and commented, "[T]he Britney thing. Look, I went to a writing camp at Teresa's. Had lovely time. Word got out. Assumptions were made. Dr Luke is exec[utive] prod[ucer] and he locks in locks out whoever he likes. And (do [I] hear [you] ask) where B's at in all this? I surely don't know. [D]id a song [with] Klas Ahlund, who wrote 'Piece of Me'. And is killa. But not on [Femme Fatale] apparently. But a good song is a good song regardless."

== Music and lyrics ==
Music writers noted electropop, dance-pop, EDM, and synth-pop styles on Femme Fatale. Music journalist Jody Rosen wrote of the album, "Conceptually it's straightforward: a party record packed with sex and sadness". The album was compared to Spears's previous albums, In the Zone (2003), Blackout (2007) and Circus (2008). Although Spears was criticized for her lack of involvement from the album's production and writing, she wrote the song "Scary", produced by Fraser T Smith, which was included on the Japanese deluxe edition of the album. The album opens with "Till the World Ends", co-written by Kesha, was described as an uptempo dance-pop and electropop song, with an electro beat and elements of techno and Eurodance. The song opens with sirens and a "sizzling" bassline. Critics complimented the song's "anthemic nature" and "chant-like chorus". The second track and lead single "Hold It Against Me" is a dance-pop song which features industrial beats, a dubstep-influenced breakdown and employing elements of grime and a final chorus with elements of rave. The lyrics portray the singer seducing someone on the dancefloor, while the chorus revolves around pick-up lines, with Spears singing: "If I said I want your body now, would you hold it against me?" "Hold It Against Me" and Spears were complimented by Rick Florino of Artistdirect for "stepping into new territory and pushing the boundaries of dance-pop once more." The third track "Inside Out" is an electropop song. It features themes of dubstep and R&B, complemented with "earth-shattering synths". The song was praised for its intricate production and has been compared to her earlier work on albums In the Zone and Circus, and also to Janet Jackson and Madonna's album Ray of Light (1998) and song Music (2000). Spears crescendos: "Baby shut your mouth and turn me inside out" during the chorus section, and then goes on to "Hit me one more time it's so amazing" and "You're the only one who's ever drove me crazy", referencing her songs "...Baby One More Time" and "(You Drive Me) Crazy". "I Wanna Go", the fourth track, is a dance-pop and Hi-NRG song, that includes elements of techno and a heavy bassline. The song contains a whistled melody. In the chorus, she stutters: "I-I-I wanna go-o-o / All the wa-a-ay / Taking out my freak tonight". The "builds and breaks" were compared to her album Blackout.

"How I Roll" is the fifth track, produced by Bloodshy, Henrik Jonback and Magnus, where Spears "pirouettes from a gulping in-and-out breath effect", and was described as a "bubbly, playful pop song". Spears's voice is heavily altered, with her voice being put through many distorters, filters, and blenders. The song uses constant rushed handclaps, with elements which were compared to Janet Jackson's "Strawberry Bounce". The sixth and seventh tracks "(Drop Dead) Beautiful" and "Seal It With a Kiss" were commented as "fillers" by Christopher Kostakis of Samesame.com.au. However, Keith Caulfield of Billboard states that "with giggly lyrical couplings like 'your body looks so sick, I think I caught the flu' and 'you must be B.I.G. because you got me hypnotized' -- '[Drop Dead] Beautiful' doesn't take itself too seriously." "Big Fat Bass" is Femme Fatale's eighth track, and it was said that it "sticks to dancefloor essentials". "Trouble for Me", the ninth song on the album, features a pre-chorus filled with "melting, wheezing synths" likened to a "Wiley grime wobble," segueing into a "Janet Jackson vocal." Spears's voice had been Auto-Tuned, but her voice was described as "raw" and the tones and wines as "sexy" and "one of a kind". "Criminal", the last track on the album's standard edition, is a guitar-driven midtempo song, which incorporates a folk-style flute melody. Erin Thompson of the Seattle Weekly said the song "takes a breather from aggressive, wall-to-wall synths, driven instead by a steady guitar rhythm and an oddly Asian folky-sounding flute melody." In the verses, Spears sings about being in love with a bad boy and outlaw, in lyrics such as "He is a hustler / He's no good at all / He is a loser, he's a bum, bum, bum, bum" and "He is a bad boy with a tainted heart / And even I know this ain't smart". During the chorus, she pleads to her mother not to worry in lines such as "But mama I'm in love with a criminal" and "Mama please don't cry / I will be alright."

According to Billboard, "Up n' Down" "heads back to the dance floor, where we find ourselves picturing an aggressive Spears going 'Up N' Down.'" The fourteenth track, "He About to Lose Me" is a pop rock-influenced ballad stated as "[packing] a serious emotional punch. Spears sings about being at the club, entranced by a new man she's made contact with -- all the while thinking of her current beau, who's at home. Will she leave the club with the new guy? Or will she go home to her man -- a guy she's not even all that sure loves her anymore?" The final track on the deluxe version, "Don't Keep Me Waiting", has been described as "a new wavey rock moment for Spears, where fuzzzed-out guitars are paired with what sound like live drums on the ready-for-the-arena track."

== Title and artwork ==
On February 2, 2011, Spears announced the album's title through her Twitter account, and also posted an image of the album cover. Spears stated:

I've poured my heart and soul into this album over the last 2 years. I've put everything I have into it. This album is for you, my fans, who have always supported me and have stuck by me every step of the way! I love you all! Sexy and Strong. Dangerous yet mysterious. Cool yet confident! FEMME FATALE.

Following the announcement, the title became a trending topic on Twitter, and then went on to become the tenth longest-running trend on the site, as well as the first music related trend to break the top ten.

The cover artwork was shot by Randee St. Nicholas and features a close-up shot of Spears, wearing a white dress with white fur on her shoulders.

In a retrospective article about "the sexist, empowering history of the femme fatale", Scott Meslow wrote from The Week, "And as the femme fatale archetype shifted toward female empowerment, some women [like Britney] began owning it outright."

== Release and promotion ==
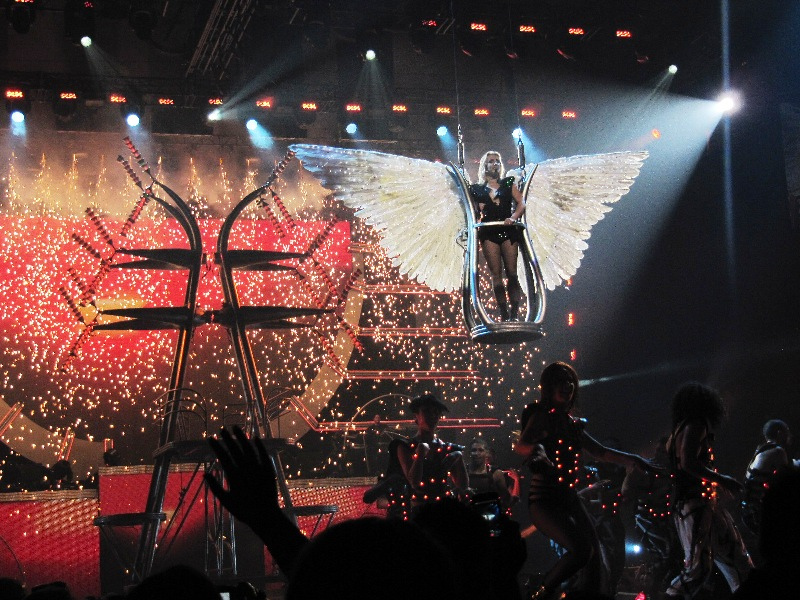
Spears performing "Till the World Ends" during the Femme Fatale Tour, 2011

Femme Fatale was released on March 25, 2011 in Europe and Oceania and four days later in the United States through Jive Records; both standard and deluxe editions were released. The first set of promotion included an interview from Ryan Seacrest, then promotion for the album began on March 25, 2011, in a performance that included "Hold It Against Me", "Till the World Ends" and "Big Fat Bass". The performance was filmed at Rain Nightclub inside the Palms Casino Resort and was included in a MTV special titled Britney Spears: I Am the Femme Fatale, which aired on April 3, 2011. Spears manager Larry Rudolph explained the choice of the location for the performances in an interview with MTV, saying, "we chose the Palms because the Palms is where Britney has so much history. We performed here with the Britney album, we did a similar thing. We're doing this eight years later now and we're doing it for the fans." Rudolph also explained that the singer's main goal was to entertain her fans in the Femme Fatale era, and added, "I want them to know — when the fans watch this — I want them to know that Britney is back and better than ever, not that she's ever gone anywhere. But she's back and she's better than ever." The original airing of the special in the United States was viewed by 0.665 million viewers and received a Nielsen rating of 0.3/1 in the key adults 18–49 demographic.

On March 27, Spears performed the same set of songs in the Bill Graham Civic Auditorium to a crowd of 5,000 people for a special episode of Good Morning America that aired on March 29. The singer also performed the same three-song set and participated in two skits on Jimmy Kimmel Live! on March 29. She was scheduled to make several appearances on The Ellen DeGeneres Show on the week of the album's release, but these were later canceled. In April 2011, Spears appeared in a remix to the song "S&M" by Rihanna, after Rihanna asked her fans via Twitter who they wanted her to collaborate with. The song reached number one in the US in mid-April 2011, giving Spears her fifth number one on the chart. She also served as a guest host at the 2011 Wango Tango concert series alongside Ryan Seacrest on May 14, 2011. Spears made a brief appearance at the 2011 Billboard Music Awards, performing the "S&M" remix with Rihanna and a short version of "Till the World Ends" alongside Femme Fatale tourmate Nicki Minaj. "(Drop Dead) Beautiful" was available for free download on the Freeform website until the premiere of their made-for-television film Teen Spirit on August 5, 2011. "Trouble for Me" was also featured on the main page of BMG's website. Spears also appeared at the 2011 MTV Video Music Awards, where she was awarded the Michael Jackson Video Vanguard Award. "Gasoline" was used in a November 2012 commercial for Spears's perfume Fantasy Twist.

=== Tour ===
On June 16, 2011, Spears embarked on her eight concert tour to further promote Femme Fatale. It was announced on March 29, 2011, and included forty-five shows in North America and twenty-six in Europe. In an interview on Ryan Seacrest's radio show on March 4, 2011, Spears stated she would tour the United States in the "early summer" in support of Femme Fatale. On March 29, 2011, following her performances on Good Morning America, she announced a co-headlining tour with Enrique Iglesias, starting in June 2011. Hours after the announcement, it was reported by Billboard that Iglesias had pulled out of the tour. Ray Wedell of Billboard speculated that the reason may have been that Spears was deemed by news outlets as the headliner, while Iglesias was considered the opening act. The first twenty-six North American dates were also announced on March 29, 2011. The opening acts were announced on April 12, 2011. Spears stated: "This is the Femme Fatale tour and I'm thrilled to have Nicki Minaj, Jessie and the Toy Boys, and Nervo join me and get everyone on the dance floor. Can't wait to take the Femme Fatales on the road." Tickets for select markets go on sale beginning April 30 at Ticketmaster and Live Nation's websites. In March 2011, Spears's manager Larry Rudolph told MTV News that the tour would have a "post-apocalyptic vibe", while commenting that "Till the World Ends" keeps becoming a theme for us." He also announced Jamie King as the tour director. The tour opened to positive reviews, with some calling it her best tour in her entire career.

== Singles ==
"Hold It Against Me" was released as the album's lead single on January 10, 2011. The music video for the song premiered on February 17, 2011 on MTV following a two-week teaser campaign and featured Spears as an alien who finds fame on Earth but becomes overwhelmed with her celebrity and breaks down. "Hold It Against Me" became Spears's fourth number-one single on the US Billboard Hot 100 and second to debut at that position, making Spears the second artist in the chart's history to have multiple singles debut at number one. The song also went to number one in Belgium (Wallonia), Canada, Denmark, Finland, New Zealand and South Korea.

"Till the World Ends" was released as the second single, making its premiere on Ryan Seacrest's radio show On Air with Ryan Seacrest. The song received positive reviews from critics, complimenting its catchy appeal and anthemic nature. The music video for "Till the World Ends" was released on April 6, 2011, on Vevo and showcased Spears in an underground dance party. A remix featuring Minaj and Kesha was also released. "Till the World Ends" was commercially successful worldwide, peaking at number three in the United States and topped the charts in Poland, Russia, Slovakia and South Korea, reaching the top ten in Australia, Belgium (Wallonia), Canada, Czech Republic, Denmark, Finland, France, Ireland, Israel, Italy, Mexico, New Zealand, Norway, Scotland, Sweden and Switzerland. The song also became Spears' biggest radio hit in the United States at the time, reaching a radio audience of ninety-eight million, the highest weekly audience of her career before "I Wanna Go" was released.

"I Wanna Go" was announced as the third single on May 13, 2011. It was officially released to radio in the United States on June 14, 2011. The song received positive reviews from critics who praised the song's hook. The music video for "I Wanna Go" was released on June 22, 2011, and featured Spears daydreaming about different scenarios during a press conference. After the video premiere, the song reached number twenty-nine on the Billboard Hot 100. After "I Wanna Go" reached number seven in the United States, Femme Fatale became Spears's first album to produce three top ten hits on the chart.

"Criminal" was announced as the album's fourth and final single following the 2011 MTV Video Music Awards on August 28, 2011. Earlier that month, a poll on Spears's official Facebook page appeared, asking the fans to vote for the fourth official single from Femme Fatale, the choices being "Criminal", "(Drop Dead) Beautiful" and "Inside Out". "Criminal" was later released on September 30, 2011, as the final single from the album. The accompanying music video was filmed in Stoke Newington, a district of London, England. It peaked at number fifty-five in the United States.

Despite not being released as a single, the deluxe edition track "Selfish" peaked at number five and 12 on the Billboard component charts, Digital Song Sales and Dance/Electronic Songs, respectively, in February 2024, following a fan campaign aimed to overtake Justin Timberlake's single of the same name.

== Critical reception ==
Professional ratings
Aggregate scores
Source	Rating
AnyDecentMusic?	6.1/10
Metacritic	67/100
Review scores
Source	Rating
AllMusic	3.5/5 stars
Entertainment Weekly	B+
The Guardian	3/5 stars
The Independent	2/5 stars
MSN Music (Expert Witness)	B+
NME	7/10
The Observer	4/5 stars
Rolling Stone	4/5 stars
Slant Magazine	3/5 stars
Spin	7/10

Femme Fatale received generally positive reviews from most critics. At Metacritic, Femme Fatale holds an average score of 67 out of 100 (indicating "generally favorable reviews") based on 25 reviews from mainstream music critics. Jody Rosen of Rolling Stone commented that it "may be Britney's best album; certainly it's her strangest". AllMusic editor Stephen Thomas Erlewine viewed that Spears's presence on the album is overshadowed by its "high-class" production, calling the album "essentially a cleaner, classier remake of the gaudily dark Blackout [...] a producer's paradise". Robert Everett-Green of The Globe and Mail gave the album three-and-a-half out of four stars and complimented its "grainy, glistening electronic sound", calling it "one of the major guilty pleasures in pop this year". Kitty Empire of The Observer commented that Spears "has turned out the "fierce dance record" she promised". Ailbhe Malone of NME viewed it as her "best work" and wrote that it "brims with the laidback confidence of someone who knows she's back on top."

MSN Music's Robert Christgau gave the album a B+ rating, indicating "remarkable one way or another, yet also flirts with the humdrum or the half-assed". Slant Magazine's Sal Cinquemani commented that Spears's lack of involvement makes "the success of a Britney song rest almost entirely on the quality of other people's songwriting and production, and almost every track on Femme Fatale succeeds or fails on that basis". Los Angeles Times writer Carl Wilson felt that the album "finds unity of subject, style and sound by imagining scenarios in which vanishing into anonymity can be comfort and liberation". Tom Gockelen-Kozlowski of The Daily Telegraph felt that, "despite her weak voice and empty lyrics, [Spears] has placed herself at the avant-garde of pop with this masterful mixture of über-cool dubstep and sugary pop". The A.V. Club's Genevieve Koski wrote that Spears "settles into [the production], game for whatever and confident in the hands of trusted professionals who know how to best utilize her".

In a mixed review, Andy Gill of The Independent criticized its "single-minded dedication to dancefloor utility" and observed "only the tiniest of rhythmic variants or differences in electronic tones distinguishing one producer's work from another's". Jon Caramanica of The New York Times commented that "much of the music on this album feels flat and redundant, no more invigorating than the average European dance-pop album of five years ago". The Guardian's Alexis Petridis wrote that Spears's "voice is as anonymous as ever, a state of affairs amplified by the lavishing of Auto-Tune". Evan Sawdey of PopMatters wrote that "Spears' worldview is completely self-contained" and described Femme Fatale as "just a big dumb club album". Rich Juzwiak of The Village Voice wrote that her "voice doesn't add much to the conversation", writing that her lack of presence is "problematic for an album whose subject matter is hedonism and how being hot facilitates it".

Music critics, despite giving favorable reviews, noted Spears's apparent lack of creative input and songwriting credits on Femme Fatale. Other critics complained about the album not staying from dance-pop songs. Singer-songwriter Ryan Tedder defended her, stating that "[Frank] Sinatra didn't write a song, Garth Brooks barely wrote anything, George Strait has had I think 51 No. 1's and he has yet to write a song. Rascal Flatts are one of the biggest country acts in the world, and all of their hits are written by other people." Spears responded to further criticism of her performing abilities, "I don’t really have anything to prove at this point. I just do it for fun and see what happens."

Jocelyn Vena of MTV noted that "for the first time in a while, she seemed comfortable being the pop megastar that she is." Spin named Femme Fatale the 50th best album of 2011 and also placed it at number 3 in their "20 Best Pop Albums of 2011" list. Digital Spy ranked the album at number 11 at their year ends list. "Till the World Ends" was named the third best song of 2011 by Rolling Stone and the third best single of 2011 by Billboard, who described it as "Britney's most immediate single since 'Toxic'." Digital Spy also considered the track as the best song of 2011, naming it "Britney's best track since 'Toxic'" and "her most underrated hit."

== Awards and nominations ==
Awards and nominations
Year	Category	Award	Result	Ref.
2011	Favorite Billboard 200 No. 1 Album	Billboard's Mid-Year Music Award	Won	
2012	Favorite Album	People's Choice Award	Nominated	

== Commercial performance ==
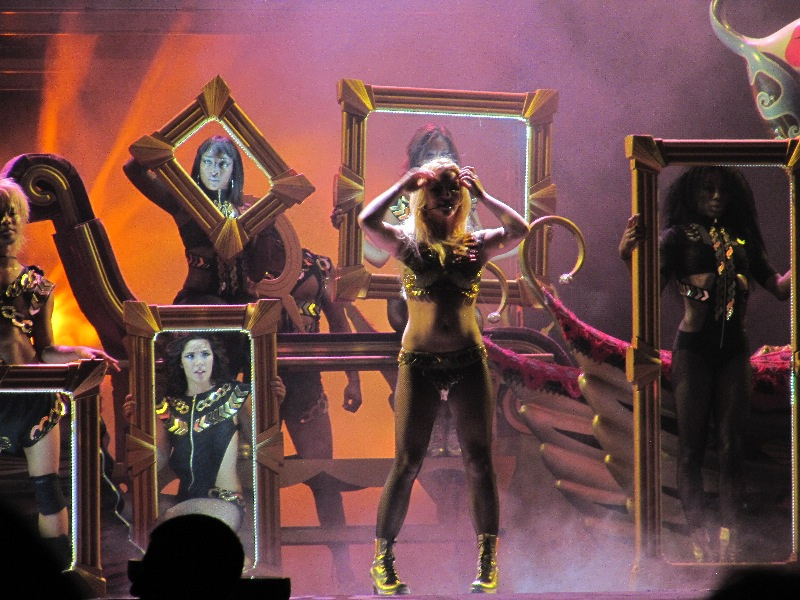
Spears performing "(Drop Dead) Beautiful" during the Femme Fatale Tour, 2011

Femme Fatale debuted at number one on the US Billboard 200, with first-week sales of 276,000 copies. This gave Spears her sixth debut at the top of the chart and leaves her in a four-way tie for third most number-one albums for a female artist, along with Mariah Carey, Janet Jackson and Beyoncé. In its second week, the album fell one slot to number two, with sales of 75,000 units, giving it a two-week total of 351,000 sold in the United States. The album spent five consecutive weeks within the Billboard 200 top ten. The album was certified platinum in April 2011 by the Recording Industry Association of America (RIAA), and has sold 805,000 copies in the country as of May 2020. In Mexico, the album debuted at number one upon its release, spending three weeks inside the top ten before falling to number thirteen. Asociación Mexicana de Productores de Fonogramas y Videogramas (AMPROFON) has certified the album gold and according to Sony Music México, the album has gone on to sell over 40,000 copies in the country.

The album debuted at number eight on the UK Albums Chart, selling 31,650 copies in its first week, becoming her lowest-charting studio album in the United Kingdom since In the Zone (2003), which peaked at number thirteen in July 2004. In Germany, the album debuted at number ten, making it her seventh consecutive top-ten studio album, and her eighth top-ten album with the inclusion of the greatest hits album Greatest Hits: My Prerogative (2004), which peaked at number four. Femme Fatale debuted at number eight in Denmark, selling 1,009 copies in its first week. On April 4, 2011, Femme Fatale debuted at number one in Australia, making it Spears's first number-one album in the country. It was also certified gold by the Australian Recording Industry Association (ARIA) during its debut week for shipments over 35,000 copies.

On 2011 Billboard's mid-year sales list, Spears appeared twice: Femme Fatale reached number twelve with 590,000 sold units and its second single "Till the World Ends" number eighteen with 1,989,000 sold units. As of February 2014, the album had sold 2.4 million copies worldwide.

== Track listing ==
Femme Fatale
No.	Title	Writer(s)	Producer(s)	Length
1.	"Till the World Ends"	Lukasz Gottwald; Alexander Kronlund; Max Martin; Kesha Sebert	Dr. Luke; Martin; Billboard; Wright^{[a]}	3:57
2.	"Hold It Against Me"	Martin; Gottwald; Mathieu Jomphe; Bonnie McKee	Dr. Luke; Martin; Billboard^{[b]}	3:48
3.	"Inside Out"	Gottwald; Jacob Kasher Hindlin; Jomphe; Martin; McKee	Dr. Luke; Martin; Billboard; Wright^{[a]}	3:38
4.	"I Wanna Go"	Shellback; Martin; Savan Kotecha	Martin; Shellback	3:30
5.	"How I Roll"	Christian Karlsson; Henrik Jonback; Magnus Lidehäll; Pontus Winnberg; McKee; Nicole Morier	Bloodshy; Jonback; Magnus; Wright^{[a]}	3:36
6.	"(Drop Dead) Beautiful" (featuring Sabi)	Jeremy Coleman; Joshua Coleman; Ester Dean; Jomphe; Benjamin Levin	Benny Blanco; Ammo; JMike; Billboard; Wright^{[a]}	3:36
7.	"Seal It with a Kiss"	Gottwald; Martin; McKee; Henry Walter	Dr. Luke; Martin; Cirkut; Wright^{[a]}	3:26
8.	"Big Fat Bass" (featuring will.i.am)	William Adams	will.i.am	4:44
9.	"Trouble for Me"	Fraser T Smith; Heather Bright; Olivia Waithe	Smith	3:19
10.	"Trip to Your Heart"	Karlsson; Jonback; Lidehäll; Winnberg; Morier; Sophie Stern	Bloodshy; Jonback; Magnus; Wright^{[a]}	3:33
11.	"Gasoline"	Gottwald; Claude Kelly; Levin; McKee; Emily Wright	Dr. Luke; Blanco; Wright^{[a]}	3:08
12.	"Criminal"	Shellback; Martin; Tiffany Amber	Martin; Shellback	3:45
Total length:				44:00

Revised deluxe edition
No.	Title	Writer(s)	Producer(s)	Length
13.	"Up n' Down"	Shellback; Martin; Kotecha	Martin; Shellback; Oligee	3:42
14.	"He About to Lose Me"	Rodney Jerkins; Ina Wroldsen	Jerkins	3:48
15.	"Selfish"	Dean; Mikkel S. Eriksen; Tor Erik Hermansen; Sandy Wilhelm; Traci Hale	Stargate; Sandy Vee; Kuk Harrell^{[a]}	3:43
16.	"Don't Keep Me Waiting"	Jerkins; Michaela Shiloh; Thomas Lumpkins	Jerkins	3:21
17.	"Scary"	Britney Spears; Smith; Kasia Livingston	Smith	3:39
Total length:				62:13

=== Notes ===
- ^{^[a]} signifies a vocal producer
- ^{^[b]} signifies a co-producer
- Original deluxe edition excludes track 17.
- Japanese standard edition pressings use the same track listing as the revised deluxe edition.
- Premium fan edition pressings use the same track listing as the revised deluxe edition, and include a bonus 7-inch single for "Hold It Against Me", containing its main and instrumental versions.

== Personnel ==
Credits for Femme Fatale adapted from AllMusic.

- Ammo – instrumentation, producer, programming, background vocals
- Beatriz Artola – engineer
- Stacey Barnett – background vocals
- Billboard – instrumentation, producer, programming
- Benny Blanco – instrumentation, producer, programming, background vocals
- Sophia Black – background vocals
- Christian Karlsson – instrumentation, producer, programming, vocal producer
- Heather Bright – background vocals
- Tom Coyne – mastering
- Ester Dean – background vocals
- Megan Dennis – production coordination
- DJ Ammo – drum programming, synthesizer
- Dr. Luke – executive producer, instrumentation, producer, programming, background vocals
- Dream Machine – instrumentation, producer, programming
- Dylan Dresdow – mixing
- Eric Eylands – assistant engineer
- Ashton Foster – background vocals
- Livvi Franc – background vocals
- Fraser T Smith – drum programming, keyboards, producer
- Clint Gibbs – production coordination
- Aniela Gottwald – assistant
- Tatiana Gottwald – assistant
- Venza Gottwald – assistant
- John Hanes – engineer, mixing
- Jeri Heiden – art direction
- Jacob Kasher Hindlin
- Sam Holland – engineer, background vocals
- J-MIKE – instrumentation, producer, programming, background vocals
- Cristyle Johnson – background vocals
- Henrik Jonback – instrumentation, producer, programming, vocal producer
- Claude Kelly – background vocals
- Padraic Kerin – engineer
- Alexander Kronlund – instrumentation, programming
- Adam Leber – A&R
- Jeremy "J Boogs" Levin – assistant
- Magnus – instrumentation, producer, programming, vocal producer
- Myah Marie – background vocals
- Max Martin – engineer, executive producer, instrumentation, keyboards, producer, programming, background vocals
- Bonnie McKee – background vocals, guest vocals
- Nicole Morier – background vocals
- Jackie Murphy – creative director
- Rob Murray – assistant
- Chris "Tek" O'Ryan – engineer
- Chau Phan – background vocals
- Irene Richter – production coordination
- Tim Roberts – assistant engineer, mixing assistant
- Patrizia Rogosch – background vocals
- Larry Rudolph – A&R
- Britney Spears – lead vocals, concept, background vocals
- Shellback – bass, engineer, guitar, keyboards, producer
- Nick Steinhardt – art direction, design
- Ryan Supple – photo production
- Peter Thea – A&R
- Dave Thomas – stylist
- will.i.am – drum programming, engineer, piano, producer, synthesizer, guest vocals
- Emily Wright – engineer, vocal producer
- Randee St. Nicholas – photography
- Şerban Ghenea – mixing

== Charts ==
=== Weekly charts ===
Weekly chart performance
Chart (2011)	Peak position
Australian Albums (ARIA)	1
Austrian Albums (Ö3 Austria)	10
Belgian Albums (Ultratop Flanders)	8
Belgian Albums (Ultratop Wallonia)	5
Brazilian Albums (Pro-Música Brasil)	6
Canadian Albums (Billboard)	1
Croatian International Albums (HDU)	8
Czech Albums (ČNS IFPI)	5
Danish Albums (Hitlisten)	8
Dutch Albums (Album Top 100)	7
Finnish Albums (Suomen virallinen lista)	7
French Albums (SNEP)	4
German Albums (Offizielle Top 100)	10
Greek Albums (IFPI)	6
Hungarian Albums (MAHASZ)	6
Irish Albums (IRMA)	4
Italian Albums (FIMI)	4
Japanese Albums (Oricon)	8
Mexican Albums (Top 100 Mexico)	1
New Zealand Albums (RMNZ)	3
Norwegian Albums (VG-lista)	3
Polish Albums (ZPAV)	17
Portuguese Albums (AFP)	4
Russian Albums (2М)	1
Scottish Albums (Official Charts)	10
South Korean Albums (Circle) Deluxe edition	8
South Korean Albums (Circle)	12
South Korean International Albums (Circle) Deluxe edition	3
South Korean International Albums (Circle)	5
Spanish Albums (Promusicae)	4
Spanish Albums (PROMUSICAE) Till The World Ends The Remixes	40
Swedish Albums (Sverigetopplistan)	5
Swiss Albums (Schweizer Hitparade)	2
Taiwan International Albums (G-Music)	2
UK Albums (Official Charts)	8
US Billboard 200	1
Uruguayan Albums (CUD)	4

=== Monthly charts ===
Chart (2011)	Peak position
South Korea Foreign Albums (Circle)	70

=== Year-end charts ===
Year-end chart performance
Chart (2011)	Position
Australian Albums (ARIA)	86
Belgian Albums (Ultratop Flanders)	89
Belgian Albums (Ultratop Wallonia)	45
Canadian Albums (Billboard)	41
Danish Albums (Hitlisten)	88
French Albums (SNEP)	60
French Digital Albums (SNEP)	38
Hungarian Albums (MAHASZ)	75
Mexican Albums (AMPROFON)	64
Russian Albums (2M)	16
Swedish Albums (Sverigetopplistan)	86
Swiss Albums (Schweizer Hitparade)	79
UK Albums (OCC)	139
US Billboard 200	31
US Digital Albums (Billboard)	20
Worldwide Albums (IFPI)	24

== Certifications and sales ==
Certifications and sales
Region	Certification	Certified units/sales
Australia (ARIA)	Gold	35,000^{^}
Brazil	—	80,000
Canada (Music Canada)	2× Platinum	160,000^{‡}
Denmark (IFPI Danmark)	Gold	10,000^{‡}
France (SNEP)	Gold	80,000
Ireland (IRMA)	Gold	7,500^{^}
Japan	—	28,704
Mexico (AMPROFON)	Gold	40,000
New Zealand (RMNZ)	Gold	7,500^{‡}
Poland (ZPAV)	Gold	10,000^{‡}
Russia (NFPF)	Platinum	10,000^{*}
Spain	—	4,621 (Note: Spanish sales as of March 2011 according to PROMUSICAE.)
Sweden (GLF)	Gold	20,000^{‡}
United Kingdom (BPI)	Gold	100,000^{‡}
United States (RIAA)	Platinum	1,000,000^{^}
Summaries
Worldwide	—	2,400,000
^{*} Sales figures based on certification alone.^{^} Shipments figures based on certification alone.^{‡} Sales+streaming figures based on certification alone.

== Release history ==
Release history
Region	Date	Format(s)	Edition(s)	Label	Ref.
Various	March 25, 2011	Standard; deluxe	Digital download	Jive	(Note: attributed to digital platforms in Australia, Brazil, France, Germany, Ireland, New Zealand, Norway, and the United States)
Australia	March 25, 2011	Standard; deluxe	CD	Sony	
Denmark	March 25, 2011	Standard; deluxe	CD	Sony	
Finland	March 25, 2011	Standard; deluxe	CD	Sony	
Germany	March 25, 2011	Standard; deluxe	CD	Sony	
Netherlands	March 25, 2011	Deluxe	CD	Sony	
Sweden	March 25, 2011	Standard	CD	Sony	
France	March 28, 2011	Deluxe	CD	Jive	
Hong Kong	March 28, 2011	Deluxe	CD	Sony	
Poland	March 28, 2011	Standard; deluxe	CD	Sony	
United Kingdom	March 28, 2011	Deluxe	CD	Jive	
Canada	March 29, 2011	Standard; deluxe	CD	Sony	
Taiwan	March 29, 2011	Deluxe	CD	Sony	
United States	March 29, 2011	Standard; deluxe	CD	Jive	
South Africa	April 4, 2011	Deluxe	CD	Sony	
United States	April 5, 2011	Premium fan	CD + 7-inch vinyl	Jive	
Japan	April 6, 2011	Standard	CD	Sony Japan	
United States	March 31, 2023	Standard	Vinyl (Note: Prior to the 2023 vinyl release, Femme Fatale was made available on vinyl and cassette exclusively at Urban Outfitters, in 2020 and 2021, respectively.)	Legacy	
Australia	May 26, 2023	Standard	Vinyl	Sony	
Europe	May 26, 2023	Standard	Vinyl	Sony	
Various	October 16, 2025	Revised deluxe	Digital download; streaming	RCA	

== See also ==
- List of Billboard 200 number-one albums of 2011
- List of number-one albums of 2011 (Australia)
- List of number-one albums of 2011 (Canada)
- List of number-one albums of 2011 (Mexico)
