= List of Canadian Hot 100 number-one singles of 2011 =

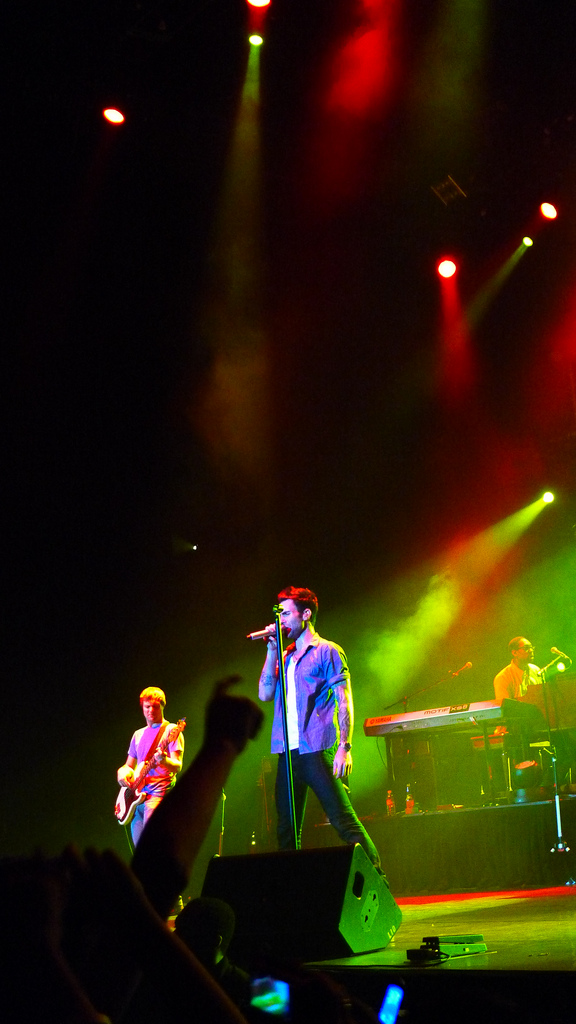
"Moves like Jagger" by Maroon 5 (pictured) featuring Christina Aguilera spent ten weeks at number one, becoming the longest-running number-one single of the year.

This is a list of the Canadian Billboard magazine Canadian Hot 100 number-ones of 2011.

Note that Billboard publishes charts with an issue date approximately 7–10 days in advance.

== Chart history ==
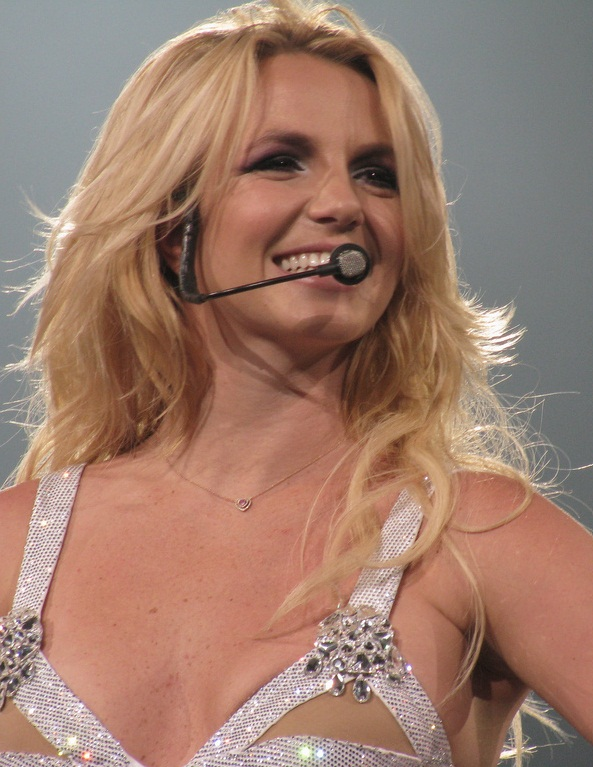
"Hold It Against Me" by Britney Spears (pictured) debuted at number one, becoming the sixth song to do so.

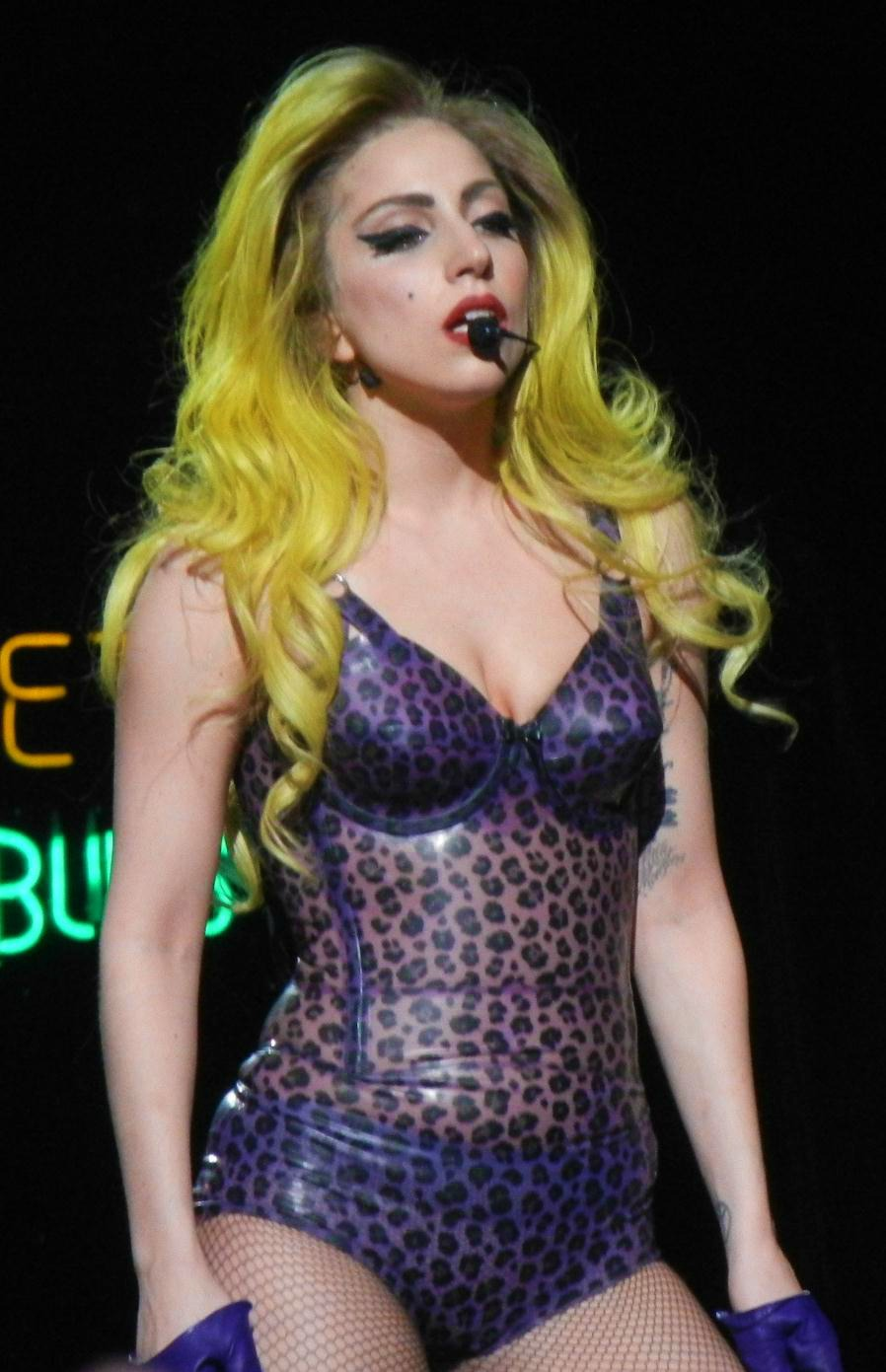
Lady Gaga (pictured)'s "Born This Way" debuted and stayed No. 1 for seven consecutive weeks.

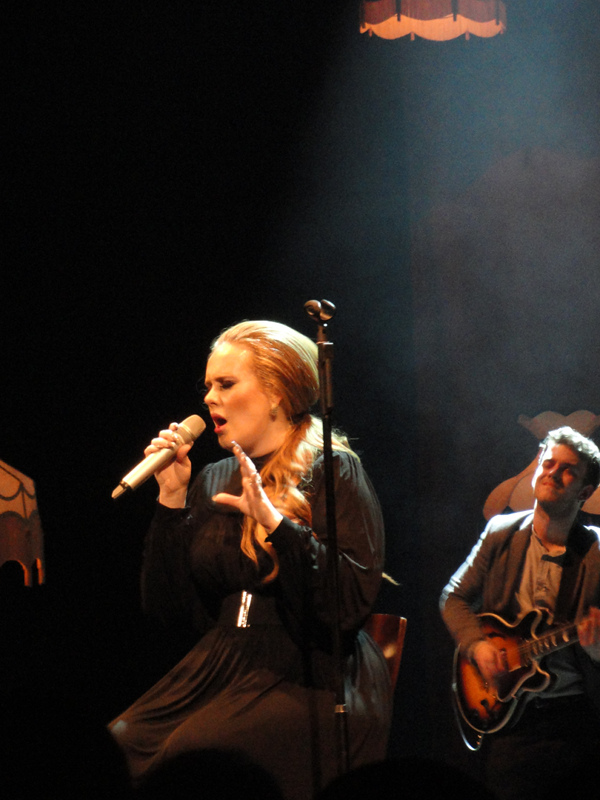
Singer Adele (pictured)'s "Rolling in the Deep" topped the chart for three consecutive weeks and over the course of the year became the best-performing single of 2011.

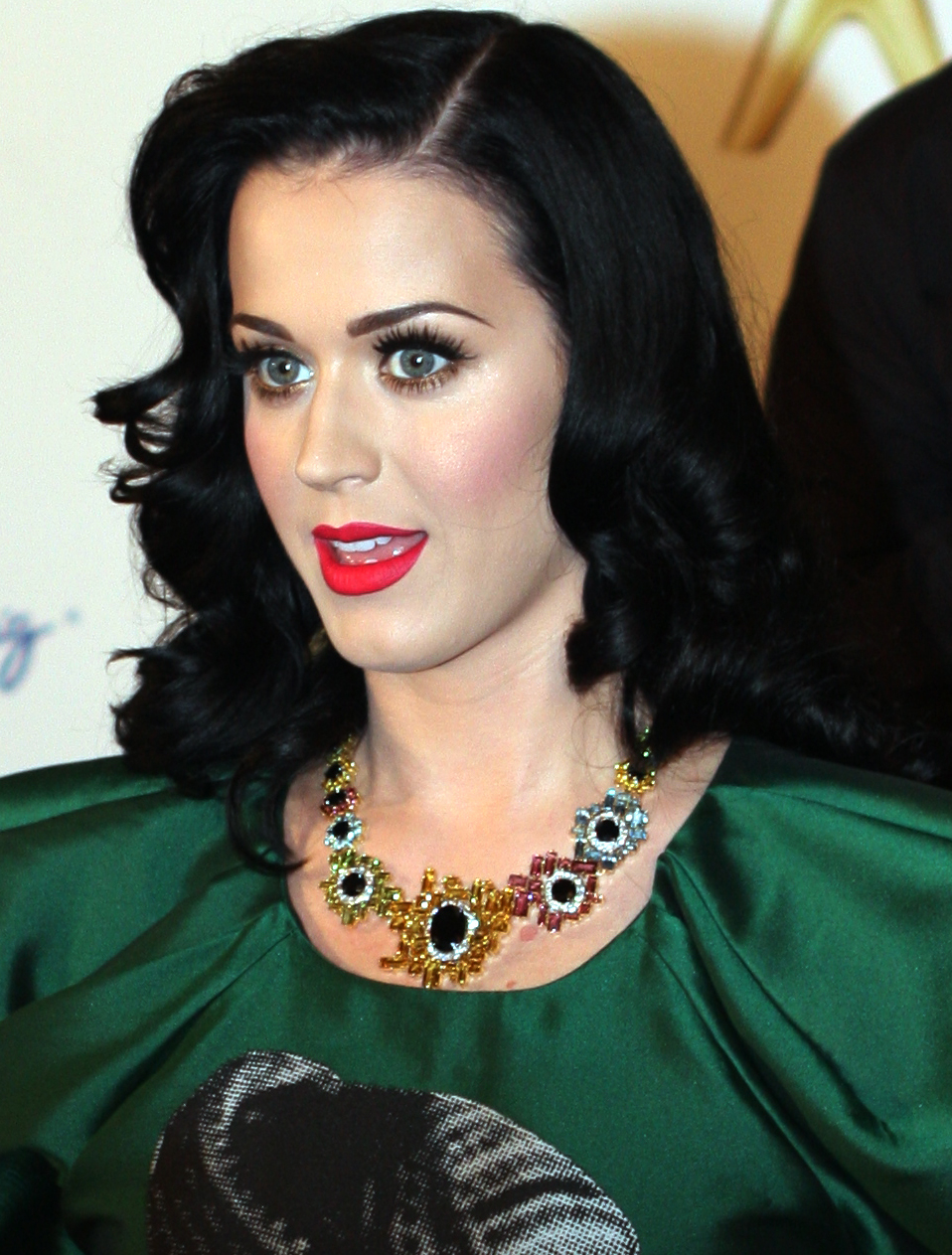
With "E.T." and "Last Friday Night (T.G.I.F.)", Katy Perry (pictured) became the first act to score four number-one singles from one album.

Key
†	Indicates best-performing single of 2011

No.	Issue date	Song	Artist(s)	Reference(s)
re	January 1	"The Time (Dirty Bit)"	The Black Eyed Peas	
re	January 8	"The Time (Dirty Bit)"	The Black Eyed Peas	
re	January 15	"The Time (Dirty Bit)"	The Black Eyed Peas	
45	January 22	"Grenade"	Bruno Mars	
46	January 29	"Hold It Against Me"	Britney Spears	
47	February 5	"More"	Usher	
re	February 12	"Grenade"	Bruno Mars	
re	February 19	"Grenade"	Bruno Mars	
48	February 26	"Born This Way"	Lady Gaga	
48	March 5	"Born This Way"	Lady Gaga	
48	March 12	"Born This Way"	Lady Gaga	
48	March 19	"Born This Way"	Lady Gaga	
48	March 26	"Born This Way"	Lady Gaga	
48	April 2	"Born This Way"	Lady Gaga	
48	April 9	"Born This Way"	Lady Gaga	
49	April 16	"On the Floor"	Jennifer Lopez featuring Pitbull	
49	April 23	"On the Floor"	Jennifer Lopez featuring Pitbull	
50	April 30	"S&M"	Rihanna	
51	May 7	"E.T."	Katy Perry featuring Kanye West	
re	May 14	"On the Floor"	Jennifer Lopez featuring Pitbull	
re	May 21	"On the Floor"	Jennifer Lopez featuring Pitbull	
52	May 28	"Rolling in the Deep" †	Adele	
52	June 4	"Rolling in the Deep" †	Adele	
52	June 11	"Rolling in the Deep" †	Adele	
53	June 18	"Give Me Everything"	Pitbull featuring Ne-Yo, Afrojack and Nayer	
53	June 25	"Give Me Everything"	Pitbull featuring Ne-Yo, Afrojack and Nayer	
53	July 2	"Give Me Everything"	Pitbull featuring Ne-Yo, Afrojack and Nayer	
53	July 9	"Give Me Everything"	Pitbull featuring Ne-Yo, Afrojack and Nayer	
54	July 16	"Party Rock Anthem"	LMFAO featuring Lauren Bennett and GoonRock	
54	July 23	"Party Rock Anthem"	LMFAO featuring Lauren Bennett and GoonRock	
re	July 30	"Give Me Everything"	Pitbull featuring Ne-Yo, Afrojack and Nayer	
re	August 6	"Give Me Everything"	Pitbull featuring Ne-Yo, Afrojack and Nayer	
55	August 13	"Last Friday Night (T.G.I.F.)"	Katy Perry	
56	August 20	"Moves like Jagger"	Maroon 5 featuring Christina Aguilera	
56	August 27	"Moves like Jagger"	Maroon 5 featuring Christina Aguilera	
56	September 3	"Moves like Jagger"	Maroon 5 featuring Christina Aguilera	
56	September 10	"Moves like Jagger"	Maroon 5 featuring Christina Aguilera	
56	September 17	"Moves like Jagger"	Maroon 5 featuring Christina Aguilera	
56	September 24	"Moves like Jagger"	Maroon 5 featuring Christina Aguilera	
56	October 1	"Moves like Jagger"	Maroon 5 featuring Christina Aguilera	
56	October 8	"Moves like Jagger"	Maroon 5 featuring Christina Aguilera	
56	October 15	"Moves like Jagger"	Maroon 5 featuring Christina Aguilera	
56	October 22	"Moves like Jagger"	Maroon 5 featuring Christina Aguilera	
57	October 29	"Sexy and I Know It"	LMFAO	
57	November 5	"Sexy and I Know It"	LMFAO	
58	November 12	"We Found Love"	Rihanna featuring Calvin Harris	
58	November 19	"We Found Love"	Rihanna featuring Calvin Harris	
58	November 26	"We Found Love"	Rihanna featuring Calvin Harris	
58	December 3	"We Found Love"	Rihanna featuring Calvin Harris	
58	December 10	"We Found Love"	Rihanna featuring Calvin Harris	
58	December 17	"We Found Love"	Rihanna featuring Calvin Harris	
58	December 24	"We Found Love"	Rihanna featuring Calvin Harris	
58	December 31	"We Found Love"	Rihanna featuring Calvin Harris	

== See also ==
- List of number-one albums of 2011 (Canada)
