= Criminal (Britney Spears song) =

2011 single by Britney Spears

Single by Britney Spears

from the album Femme Fatale
- Written: 2008
- Released: September 30, 2011
- Recorded: July 2009
- Studio: Maratone Studios (Stockholm, Sweden)
- Genre: Pop
- Length: 3:45
- Label: Jive; RCA
- Songwriters: Max Martin; Shellback; Tiffany Amber
- Producers: Max Martin; Shellback

Britney Spears singles chronology
"I Wanna Go" (2011)	"Criminal" (2011)	"Scream & Shout" (2012)

Music video
- "Criminal" on YouTube

"Criminal" is the fourth and final single from American singer Britney Spears' seventh studio album, Femme Fatale (2011). "Criminal" was written and produced by Max Martin and Shellback, with additional writing by Tiffany Amber. After Spears first listened to the song, she felt it was different and unlike anything she had heard before. She posted a snippet of it online on March 2, 2011, prior to the album's release. "Criminal" was chosen as a single by a poll on her Facebook page, as Spears explained it was a way to give back to her fans. The artwork for the single was released on September 14, 2011.

"Criminal" is a guitar and synth-driven mid-tempo song which incorporates a folk-style flute melody. It is considered one of the few ballads on Femme Fatale, and is less aggressive than the other songs of the album. "Criminal" is influenced by the works of ABBA and Madonna. In the song, Spears sings about being in love with a bad boy and outlaw, and pleads to her mother to not worry about their relationship. "Criminal" received positive critical response, with reviewers praising its organic and refreshing feel in comparison with the rest of the album. After the release of Femme Fatale, the song charted on the South Korean International chart. "Criminal" has also charted in major markets such as Canada, France, Sweden, Switzerland, Brazil and the United States.

The accompanying music video for the song was filmed at Dalston and Stoke Newington, London. It features Spears as a woman in upper society and follows her relationship with a criminal, played by her then real-life boyfriend Jason Trawick. Prior to its release, London officials criticized Spears for shooting scenes with a replica gun and glamorizing violence. The video received a positive response from critics, with some calling it the best music video from Femme Fatale. Reviewers also perceived parallels between the video and Spears's personal life.

A revival in interest for the song occurred when it went viral on TikTok, particularly with the "Mugshot Challenge". It has since become Spears' fourth most liked music video on YouTube; and in October 2020, the single reached a new peak of daily listeners on Spotify with 128,000 streams occurring on October 2.

== Background ==
"Criminal" was written in 2008 by Max Martin, Shellback and Tiffany Amber, and was produced by Martin and Shellback. Spears told MTV News that after she first listened to the song, she felt it was different and unlike anything she had heard before. In an interview with Rolling Stone, Spears spoke about Martin's productions on Femme Fatale, saying, "Max played a huge role on this album and he has been there since the beginning so there is such a huge level of trust. He gets exactly what I am saying when I tell him what I want and don't want musically". Spears recorded her vocals at Maratone Studios in Stockholm, Sweden. The track was later mixed by Serban Ghenea at MixStar Studios in Virginia Beach, Virginia. It was registered on Broadcast Music Incorporated under the legal title "In Love With a Criminal". On March 2, 2011, Spears posted on her Twitter account a link to a 17-second clip of the song, describing it as "one of [her] favorites".

On August 5, 2011, she launched a poll on her Facebook page asking fans whether her next single should be "Criminal", "Inside Out" or "(Drop Dead) Beautiful." After the 2011 MTV Video Music Awards, she revealed to MTV News that "Criminal" was chosen as the fourth single. On the British talk show This Morning, Spears explained that the song "was chosen by the fans. It was just cool to give something back to them and see what they would appreciate." The "Criminal (Radio Mix)", which was included on her second remix album, B in the Mix: The Remixes Vol. 2, was released as a single on September 30, 2011, and the song was added to the United States mainstream radio playlists on October 4, 2011. The artwork for the single was released on September 14, 2011. It features Spears looking out into the distance, with her wavy hair falling on her bare back. A mysterious hooded man is also featured on the cover. Robbie Daw of Idolator said that "it appears as if Camp Spears hired the best Photoshop expert $15 could buy when it came to designing the art. Oh, just kidding — we love red and blue! Makes us think of sex and, uh, ice-cold criminals. Or something."

== Composition ==
"Criminal" (2011)
A 23-second sample of the song.

"Criminal" is a guitar-driven midtempo song which incorporates a folk-style flute melody. Erin Thompson of the Seattle Weekly said the song "takes a breather from aggressive, wall-to-wall synths, driven instead by a steady guitar rhythm and an oddly Asian folky-sounding flute melody.". The radio edit changes the drums to be louder, among various other instrumental changes. Billboard described it as the only ballad on the album. Thompson compared it to her past work, saying it is not "sappy" like "I'm Not a Girl, Not Yet a Woman" (2002) and not "teary-sad" like "Everytime" (2004). "Criminal" is reminiscent of the music of ABBA and Madonna, and the latter's albums Ray of Light (1998) and American Life (2003), according to David Buchanan of Consequence of Sound and Samesame.com.au, respectively. The beat was compared by Keith Caufield of Billboard to Madonna's "Don't Tell Me" (2000). Carl Wilson of the Los Angeles Times said "Criminal" is "awkwardly pitched between rock and ballad". The use of the flute was compared by Amy Sciarretto of PopCrush to the sample of "The Lonely Goatherd" from The Sound of Music (1959) on Gwen Stefani's "Wind It Up" (2006).

In the verses, Spears sings about being in love with a bad boy and outlaw, in lyrics such as "He is a hustler / He's no good at all / He is a loser, he's a bum, bum, bum, bum" and "He is a bad boy with a tainted heart / And even I know this ain't smart". During the chorus, she pleads to her mother not to worry in lines such as "But mama I'm in love with a criminal" and "Mama please don't cry / I will be alright." Andrew Leahey of The Washington Times and Erin Thompson of the Seattle Weekly compared the lyrics to those of Madonna's "Papa Don't Preach" (1986), while David Bunachan compared them to Coolio's "Mama I'm in Love Wit' a Gangsta" (1994). The words in the chorus end in 'al's syllables, as evident in lyrics such as "And this type of love isn't rational / It's physical". Keith Caufield noted that they were an unintentional nod to Supertramp's "The Logical Song" (1979). Thompson stated that Spears's vocals are less processed than on the rest of the album, while according to Amy Sciarretto they are "heavily Auto-Tuned and studio-treated, [...] she delivers her lines in a monotone, robotic fashion."

== Critical reception ==
"Criminal" received positive reviews from music critics. Andy Gill of The Independent called it one of the highlights of Femme Fatale, along with "Till the World Ends". Gill also said that the album sounds more programmed than natural, commenting that "indeed, such is the shock when the final track, 'Criminal', opens with a little folksong-style flute and guitar figure that one's immediate reaction is that a Midlake soundfile has been accidentally appended to Britney's running-order." Amy Sciarretto of PopCrush gave the song four stars, explaining that "Only Brit can make a flute sound sexy. Seriously, few pop stars can pull off a flute and Brit does it with ease." Erin Thompson of the Seattle Weekly called it her best vocal performance of the album, and added that "it has a spark and a mischievous sass to it – and these days anytime Britney shows even just a bit of her old liveliness and independence, we like it." Rudy Klapper of Sputnikmusic commented the song "isn't exactly the progressive stylings of a Janelle Monáe [sic], but damn if it's not catchy and interesting." The A.V. Club's Genevieve Koski claimed that the album "[i]s not all dance-floor narcotics", adding that "Inside Out", "Till the World Ends" and "Criminal" "add texture to the wall-to-wall synth waves and booty bass." Robert Copsey of Digital Spy said the production of Femme Fatale is "polished, intriguing and – best of all – fun", exemplifying "Inside Out", the piano breakdown in "Big Fat Bass" and the flute in "Criminal".

No Ripcord's Gary McGinley stated that Femme Fatale "is so synth-led that hearing the simple guitar lines on Criminal and He's About To Lose Me (from the Deluxe Edition) is refreshing." Natalie Shaw of the BBC Online commented that "Criminal" "with its teenage lyrics [...] on top of a fairytale flute melody and a rhythm so summery it manages to completely set itself free from the rest of the album." David Buchanan of Consequence of Sound found that Femme Fatale "is entirely rescued by backtracking to Circus-style material, with Rihanna-esque 'Gasoline', and the Ray Of Light-era Madonna influence in closing song 'Criminal'. Katherine St Asaph of Popdust said that as "a bad-boy track, it at least makes a bit more lyrical sense than 'Judas' and is more vulnerable than her past few singles, which is probably a good career move." Keith Caufield of Billboard commented that "while some of the lyrics are a teensy clunky at times – [it] is a fitting closer to a nearly-completely excellent album." Los Angeles Times writer Carl Wilson stated that the album's momentum "flags only on the closing 'Criminal', with its formless Renaissance fair flute line and a tempo [that is] joyless". Thomas Conner of the Chicago Sun-Times considered "Criminal", along with "Inside Out", "weak mid-tempo fare" songs. Eric R. Danton of the Hartford Courant deemed the song as "an eye-rolling homage to those oh-so-attractive bad boys that good girls lust for in spite of themselves." Stephen Thomas Erlewine, senior editor of AllMusic, called it "a lousy song".

== Chart performance ==
Following the release of Femme Fatale, "Criminal" reached number fifty-one on South Korea's Circle foreign chart, due to digital sales. On September 26, 2011, the song debuted at number forty on the US Billboard Pop Songs. On the chart issue of November 19, 2011, it peaked at number nineteen. Promotion for the single release was minimal, with no live performances either on TV or on the Femme Fatale Tour. To date, the song has never been performed live. On October 5, 2011, "Criminal" entered on the Bubbling Under Hot 100 Singles chart at number twenty-one. Two weeks later, it debuted on the Hot 100 at number ninety-two, due to sales of 12,000 digital units. It then rose to a new peak of fifty-five. According to Nielsen Soundscan, "Criminal" has sold over 279,000 digital units in the United States as of June 2012. The song also entered Canadian Hot 100 at number eighty-three, reaching a new peak of sixty-three a week later and eventually peaking at sixteen. In Brazil, the song was a huge chart hit, peaking at number one on the Brasil Hot 100 Airplay and Brasil Hot Pop Songs charts. "Criminal" also achieved moderate success in Europe, reaching the top-twenty in Slovakia, Czech Republic, Finland and France, and the top-forty in Switzerland, Sweden, Denmark, and both regions of Belgium.

== Music video ==
=== Development ===
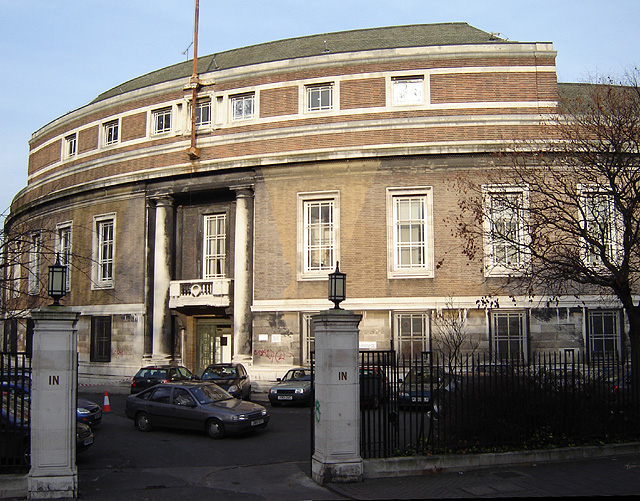
Scenes of the music video were shot at Stoke Newington Town Hall.

At the 2011 MTV Video Music Awards, Spears said to MTV News that she had thought of a "really cool concept for the video, just to make it interesting. You'll have to see." She then contacted Chris Marrs Piliero, who directed the music video for her previous single "I Wanna Go", to work with her. She told him the basic story she had planned, which he described as a "fairy-tale, sweet, knight-in-shining-armor feel to it. I said let's take that and make the fairy tale badass." Spears also wanted her real-life boyfriend Jason Trawick to play the criminal. Marrs Piliero was initially hesitant to cast Trawick feeling that a professional actor would do a better job, but did not talk to Spears about it. He told USA Today, "When you're doing nudity, I don't think it was at the top of Britney's list to bring in some random guy while her boyfriend watches. [...] We definitely wanted to make some passionate, steamy scenes, but we also wanted it to be intensely beautiful. We didn't want to go for raunchy. We wanted it to be sensual and steamy." On September 6, 2011, Spears announced through her Twitter account that she had decided to shoot the video "in the streets of merry old England when I get there." In an interview with AOL, she explained, "I've never shot on location out of the country of America for a video. So, it should be very interesting. It was partly my idea ... to see if it could to happen, and they were like, 'Yeah, it's a great idea,' so we did it."

=== Synopsis ===
Spears and her boyfriend Jason Trawick kissing as his house is being shot

The video begins at a formal party in which Spears seems to be looking for someone. The opening shot of her was inspired by the scene of Jennifer Love Hewitt walking into the party in Can't Hardly Wait (1998). Her boyfriend (model Freddy Bradshaw) talks with two people next to her. He persuades her to smile to avoid embarrassment from the guests then verbally abuses her and grabs her face, after which she leaves to the restroom, where she wipes away a tear and puts on her fragrance Radiance. She comes back to the party and catches her boyfriend flirting with another woman; Spears tells her "So you're not working the street corner tonight I see?", making her boyfriend angry. He apologizes to the other woman for his girlfriend's remark then grabs Spears by the arm and carries her outside the building. After he slaps her, one of the waiters of the party (Trawick) wearing a leather jacket punches her boyfriend several times. The waiter asks Spears if she is okay, and after she kicks her boyfriend in the crotch goodbye, she replies "Now I'm okay." She and the waiter climb on his motorcycle and leave the scene. When they get to his house, it is revealed by a newspaper that he is a criminal. She opens one of the lockers in his house and finds a gun, after which the couple kisses. This is followed by scenes of them having sex.

The next morning, the criminal brings Spears breakfast to the bed and kisses her on the forehead. He has several tattoos in his body, including one on his chest that reads "R.I.P. Goose", a reference to the film Top Gun (1986). They go to a convenience store where she steals vanilla candles and points the gun to the employee; the criminal takes money out of the cash register and they escape by stealing a Citroën DS3. The robbery is caught by the security cameras, and pictures of the couple appear on the local news. There are scenes of them having sex in the shower. As they change clothes, several policemen then appear outside the criminal's house; they start shooting it with Heckler & Koch MP5's as Spears and the man embrace, kissing passionately. The policemen then enter the house, and one of them confirms that the couple escaped. The video ends with Spears and the criminal escaping on the motorcycle as the credits roll. One of them reads "No vanilla candles were harmed in the making of this music video." The video also includes intercut scenes of Spears performing dance moves similar to voguing.

=== UK controversy ===
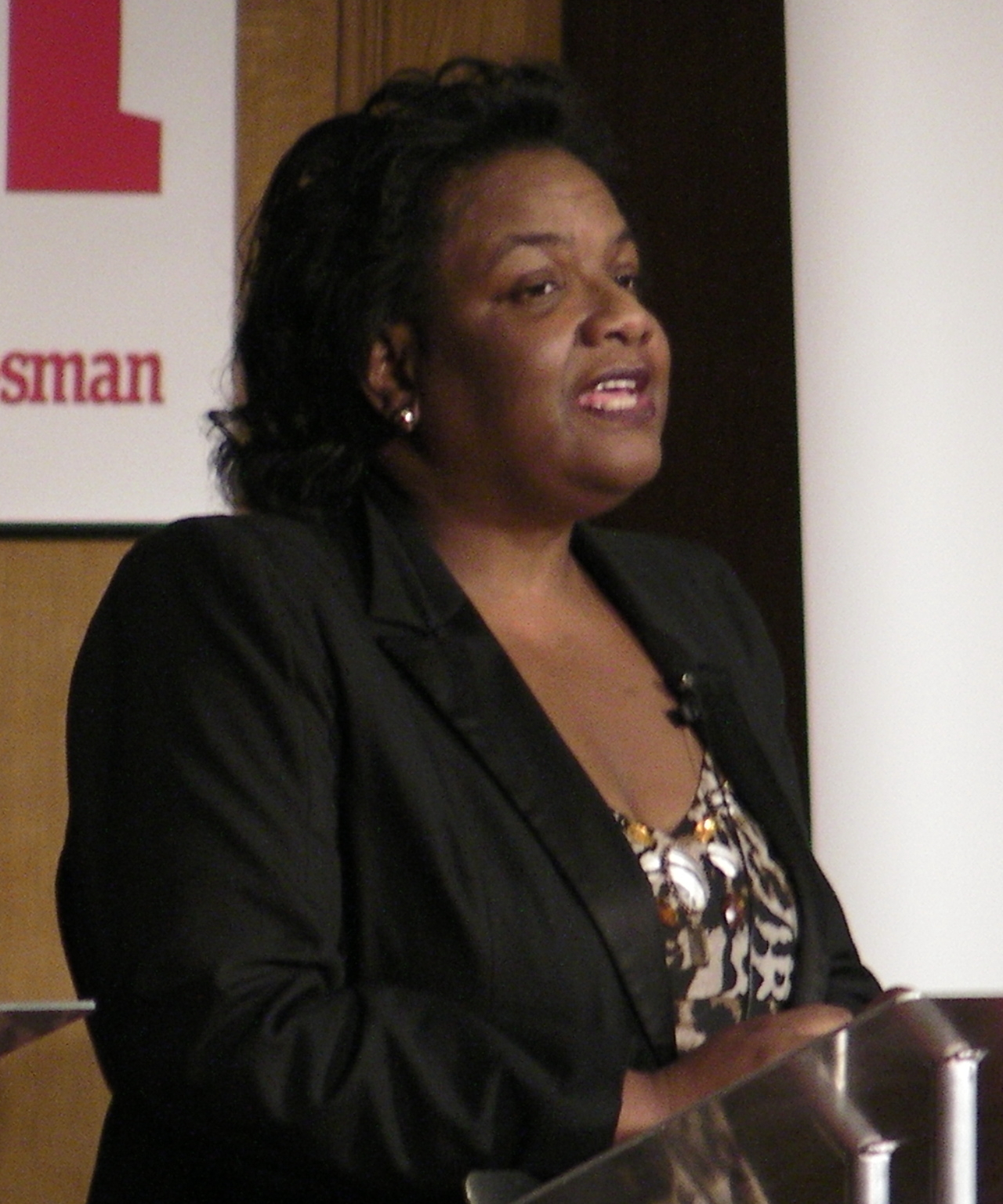
Hackney MP Diane Abbott said that Spears contributed to the glamorization of guns with the video.

After pictures of Spears and Trawick carrying replica guns on set surfaced online, the Hackney London Borough Council criticized the former for "promoting gun violence", since the area had been badly affected by the 2011 England riots. The Council told London Tonight that they had not agreed to the use of replica guns at Stoke Newington Town Hall, and that they would be raising the matter with the production company. Councillor Ian Rathbone added that Spears should apologize and make a sizeable donation to a Hackney charity "for the rudeness and damage she's done to this community." When asked if she thought the council was overreacting, Hackney MP Diane Abbott insisted: "It is only a music video but it's images like this, with popstars glamorising gangs, which means that some young people... get drawn in. Britney should really know better." Rae Alexandra of the SF Weekly explained that the United Kingdom "is not a place that readily embraces guns. Rather, it's a place where guns are rare, gun licensing is tightly controlled, and the entire establishment has been in a panic about gun use on its streets for the last three years." On September 26, 2011, Spears' representatives released a statement to MTV News saying, "The video is a fantasy story featuring Britney's boyfriend, Jason Trawick, which literally plays out the lyrics of a song written three years before the riots ever happened." Marrs Piliero stated about the controversy,

"Holding the gun became a controversial thing 'cause we filmed it in London, and they don't have a lot of gun use out there. That doesn't mean that there's no gun use, so I did find it really interesting. For me, the thing is, it blew me away that members of [the British] Parliament were speaking about this. One, because it's a music video, and two, because don't you guys have television shows out there that show crime? It's really strange to me. I don't understand why pop stars are put on such a high pedestal over other celebrities. Why do members of Parliament feel that they need to scrutinize her for having a gun, and 'She's in the public,' and 'She should know better,' and 'She's a role model,' but what about every other celebrity out there? What about every other actor? That's very strange to me. I was really surprised at how much the gun use was scrutinized. [Trawick plays] a professional criminal, so it makes sense he has a gun. We shouldn't censor ourselves."

=== Release and reception ===
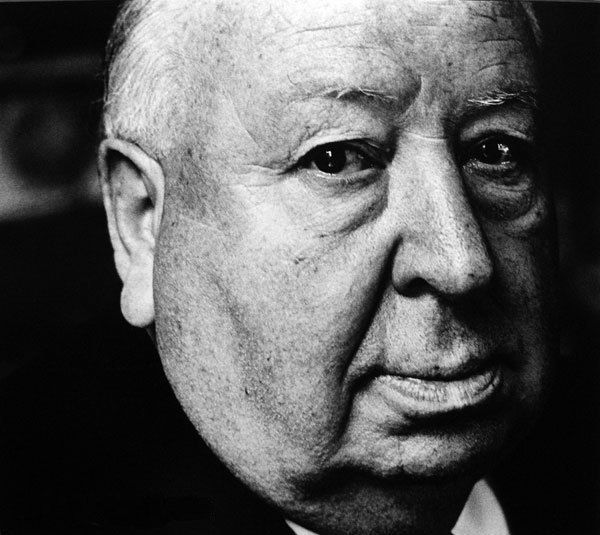
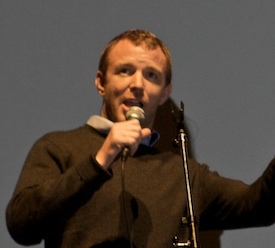
The video was compared to films by Alfred Hitchcock (left) and Guy Ritchie (right).

The video was ranked at number ten on a list of the ten most controversial music videos in pop music by AOL on September 29, 2011. Spears announced through her Twitter account on October 13, 2011, that the video would be released the following week. On October 17, 2011, she posted five GIF files with scenes from the video on her Tumblr. The video was released the same day on the iTunes Store; it reached the top position on its chart within minutes. Becky Bain of Idolator called it "an epic mini-movie, full of romance, intrigue [...] [with] a whole lot of unnecessary PDA between Brit and her beau. It was full of passion, joy and just a little touch of madness — just like its star." Bain also noted several influences, such as Alfred Hitchcock films and the music videos for Spears' "Toxic" (2004) and Green Day’s "21 Guns" (2009). A writer for Rolling Stone also compared it to a Hitchcock film and deemed the opening scene as "a tribute to Old Hollywood". The reviewer found the scenes of physical abuse "surprising" and called the acting "stiff", but said that "from there on out, we're in the usual comfort zone of a Britney video – sexy dancing, sexy vamping – with the added bonus of gratuitous PDA between the pop star and her real-life boyfriend."

USA Today's Ann Oldenburg described the video as sexy and "pretty personal." Kenneth Partridge of AOL commented, "Packed with sex, violence and questionable acting, the new Britney Spears video, 'Criminal,' has all the trappings of a midnight movie." A reporter from the American edition of The Huffington Post said: "We can't honestly remember the last time Britney Spears looked so gorgeous in a music video" and deemed it as the best video from Femme Fatale. Erin Strecker Entertainment Weekly also called it the best video of the album, and highlighted Spears' look, the ending scene and the "fun story". Katherine St Asaph of Popdust said it is "probably the best video of the Femme Fatale era." Tom Townshend of MSN stated that although the video was not appropriate for Spears' younger fans, "[it] is actually rather compelling and feels more like a short film rather than a pop starlet's music video." A writer for VH1 said that part of the reason the video works is the comic sensibility between Spears and Marrs Piliero, explaining that "[it] point[s] to one of Spears's greatest talents: giving the impression that although she takes her career extremely seriously, she nevertheless doesn't take it too seriously." The critic summarized the review by saying that the video is "entertaining [as] a bad-girl adventure story, and her role here is essentially that of a (wait for it) femme fatale."

Critics also commented on the Hackney controversy. Sarah Dean of the UK edition of The Huffington Post said: "If having a blonde, leather-clad superstar brandishing a gun at a shop owner's face isn't glamourising violence, I'm not sure what is" and added that, in essence, the video "seems more like an opportunity for her to live out her sexual fantasies than anything beneficial to music fans." Amanda Dobbins of New York stated that "After viewing the final product, we're guessing [the local officials] probably won't be down with the shower sex, the regular sex, the domestic abuse, the armed robbery, or any of Britney's other questionable activities, either." Katherine St Asaph of Popdust joked about the situation, saying, "Britney Spears’ video for 'Criminal' is out, and gang recruitment is already up 200% since 8 a.m.! This has not happened." Marianne Garvey of the UK website of E! Online said, "With the 'fantasy' getting so hot and heavy and Britney stripping down to nothing, the guns are the last thing you notice."

=== Themes and analysis ===
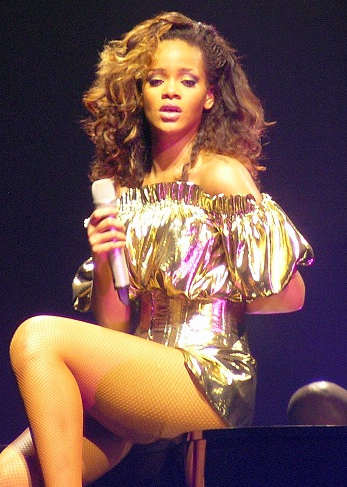
The plot and themes of the video received comparisons to that of Rihanna's "We Found Love", which premiered two days after "Criminal".

Alyssa Rosenberg of ThinkProgress said that although it is common to see pop stars being assaulted by men in their videos —exemplifying Rihanna's "Man Down"— the public is aware of Spears's vulnerability, explaining that "we believe she really would choose a guy who would do something like this to her." Rosenberg also stated even though her bad behaviour once she leaves her boyfriend is not directed at him, the fact that he treated her badly is a form of narrative permission for her to rob a store and have sex with the criminal. She also commented that the same narrative works on her previous video with Marrs Piliero for "I Wanna Go". The video received comparisons to Rihanna's "We Found Love", which was released two days after "Criminal", on October 19, 2011. Among the similarities, critics noted that they were both filmed in the United Kingdom and arose controversy in the country; both contain scenes of sex, violence and crime; both feature bad boy archetypes and both evoke the personal lives of the artists. Katherine St Asaph found the opening line of Spears's boyfriend ("Would you try smiling just once?") a subtle dig at the press. She explained that there is a tendency among writers and spectators to call "her every smile plastered on or conservator-mandated", and that the fact the line is delivered by her abusive boyfriend only makes it more evident. According to her, that there are two contradictory ways to analyze the relationship between Spears and Trawick as the criminal: it could be seen as him luring her into her life, but Spears is the one that kisses him and she is the first to pull the gun.

St Asaph explained that the only interpretation of the video lies on the opinion of each viewer about Spears's personal life, and how active a role each person imagines she plays in it. It was noted by St Asaph that although most pop stars release videos that draw from their personal lives, they do not make the viewer uncomfortable. The same cannot be said for Spears and Rihanna, and it does not matter if they themselves have moved on from past situations, because the discussion around them has not. St Asaph also expressed that neither Spears or Rihanna said much about the parallels to their lives, but that they do not need to: their videos are much more effective than anything they could reveal in an interview. Rae Alexandra of the SF Weekly also compared it to "We Found Love", saying that both videos feature an anti-British sentiment. She wrote that all the villains in the video – her boyfriend and the policemen – are British, whereas her savior in the video is an American criminal. Alexandra noted that Spears and Rihanna chose to films their "grittiest videos" in a country with a lower crime rate than the United States, that is also so against guns that politicians felt the need to talk about it. According to her, the videos continue with a xenophobic portrayal of British people as villains by American pop culture.

== Track listings ==
- Digital download
1. "Criminal" (Radio Mix) – 3:45
- Digital download (EP)
1. "Criminal" (Radio Mix) – 3:45
2. "Criminal" (Varsity Team Radio Remix) – 4:23
3. "Criminal" (Tom Piper & Riddler Remix) – 5:50
4. "Criminal" (Video) – 5:21
- Digital download (Remixes)
1. "Criminal" (DJ Laszlo Mixshow Edit) – 5:20
2. "Criminal" (DJ Laszlo Club Mix) – 6:53
3. "Criminal" (Tom Piper & Riddler Remix) – 5:50
4. "Criminal" (Varsity Team Extended Remix) – 6:36
5. "Criminal" (Varsity Team Mixshow) – 5:21

== Credits and personnel ==
Credits adapted from Femme Fatale booklet liner notes.

=== Recording ===
- Recorded at Maratone Studios, Stockholm, Sweden
- Mixed at MixStar Studios, Virginia Beach, Virginia

=== Personnel ===
- Britney Spears – backing vocals, lead vocals
- Max Martin – songwriter, producer and keyboards
- Shellback – songwriter, producer, keyboards and guitar
- Tiffany Amber – songwriter
- John Hanes – engineering
- Chau Phan – background vocals
- Tim Roberts – engineering
- Serban Ghenea – audio mixing

== Charts ==
=== Weekly charts ===
Chart (2011–12)	Peak position
Belarus (Unistar Top 20)	1
Belgium (Ultratop 50 Flanders)	38
Belgium (Ultratop 50 Wallonia)	24
Brazil (Brasil Hot 100 Airplay)	1
Brazil (Brasil Hot Pop Songs)	1
Bulgaria Airplay (BAMP)	3
Canada (Canadian Hot 100)	16
Canada CHR/Top 40 (Billboard)	21
Canada Hot AC (Billboard)	25
CIS Airplay (TopHit)	6
Czech Republic Airplay (ČNS IFPI)	6
Denmark (Tracklisten)	39
Finland (Suomen virallinen lista)	11
France (SNEP)	13
France Download (SNEP)	12
Global Dance Tracks (Billboard)	35
Hungary (Editors' Choice Top 40)	39
Iceland (Tónlistinn)	25
Israel (Media Forest)	4
Lebanon (Lebanese Top 20)	4
Netherlands (Dutch Top 40 Tipparade)	12
Poland (Polish Airplay New)	2
Romania (Romanian Top 100)	81
Russia Airplay (TopHit)	8
Slovakia Airplay (ČNS IFPI)	8
South Korea International Singles (Gaon)	51
Spain (Promusicae)	46
Spain Airplay (PROMUSICAE)	18
Sweden (Sverigetopplistan)	36
Switzerland (Schweizer Hitparade)	33
Ukraine Airplay (TopHit)	7
US Billboard Hot 100	55
US Dance Club Songs (Billboard)	41
US Pop Airplay (Billboard)	19

Chart (2020)	Peak position
Malaysia (RIM)	20

=== Monthly charts ===
Chart (2011–12)	Peak position
CIS (TopHit)	8
Russia Airplay (TopHit)	9
South Korea Foreign (Circle)	78
Ukraine Airplay (TopHit)	13

=== Year-end charts ===
Chart (2011)	Position
CIS (TopHit)	108
Lebanon (NRJ)	75
Russia Airplay (TopHit)	137
Ukraine Airplay (TopHit)	179
Chart (2012)	Position
Brazil (Brasil Hot 100 Airplay)	9
Brazil (Brasil Hot Pop Songs)	6
Brazil (Crowley Broadcast Analysis)	24
Russia (Hot 50 Airplay)	37
Russia Airplay (TopHit)	139
Ukraine Airplay (TopHit)	50

== Certifications and sales ==
Certifications and sales for "Criminal"
Region	Certification	Certified units/sales
Denmark (IFPI Danmark)	Gold	45,000^{‡}
New Zealand (RMNZ)	Gold	15,000^{‡}
South Korea (Gaon)	—	43,113
United States (RIAA)	Platinum	1,000,000^{‡}
^{‡} Sales+streaming figures based on certification alone.

== Release history ==
Country	Date	Format	Label
Belgium	September 30, 2011	Digital download	Sony Music
Italy	September 30, 2011	Digital download	Sony Music
Brazil	September 30, 2011	Digital download	Sony Music
Denmark	September 30, 2011	Digital download	Sony Music
Greece	September 30, 2011	Digital download	Sony Music
Netherlands	September 30, 2011	Digital download	Sony Music
Luxembourg	September 30, 2011	Digital download	Sony Music
Norway	September 30, 2011	Digital download	Sony Music
Switzerland	September 30, 2011	Digital download	Sony Music
Finland	October 3, 2011	Digital download	Sony Music
Sweden	October 3, 2011	Digital download	Sony Music
Portugal	October 3, 2011	Digital download	Sony Music
France	October 3, 2011	Digital download	Sony Music
United States	October 4, 2011	Digital download	Jive; RCA
Canada	October 4, 2011	Digital download	Sony Music
Spain	October 4, 2011	Digital download	Sony Music
United States	October 4, 2011	Mainstream radio	Jive; RCA
Austria	October 7, 2011	Digital download	Sony Music
Ireland	October 7, 2011	Digital download	Sony Music
Switzerland	November 11, 2011	2-Track Bundle	Sony Music
Austria	November 11, 2011	2-Track Bundle	Sony Music
Germany	November 18, 2011	2-Track Bundle	Sony Music
France	December 2, 2011	Digital Remixes EP	Sony Music
Australia	December 2, 2011	Digital Remixes EP	Sony Music
Belgium	December 2, 2011	Digital Remixes EP	Sony Music
Brazil	December 2, 2011	Digital Remixes EP	Sony Music
Denmark	December 2, 2011	Digital Remixes EP	Sony Music
Finland	December 2, 2011	Digital Remixes EP	Sony Music
Greece	December 2, 2011	Digital Remixes EP	Sony Music
Italy	December 2, 2011	Digital Remixes EP	Sony Music
Luxembourg	December 2, 2011	Digital Remixes EP	Sony Music
Netherlands	December 2, 2011	Digital Remixes EP	Sony Music
New Zealand	December 2, 2011	Digital Remixes EP	Sony Music
Norway	December 2, 2011	Digital Remixes EP	Sony Music
Portugal	December 2, 2011	Digital Remixes EP	Sony Music
Spain	December 2, 2011	Digital Remixes EP	Sony Music
Sweden	December 2, 2011	Digital Remixes EP	Sony Music
United States	December 6, 2011	Digital Remixes EP	RCA
Canada	December 6, 2011	Digital Remixes EP	Sony Music
United Kingdom	December 11, 2011	Digital Remixes EP	RCA

== See also ==
- List of Hot 100 number-one singles of 2012 (Brazil)
- List of number-one pop hits of 2012 (Brazil)
