= List of number-one albums of 2011 (Canada) =

These are the Canadian number-one albums of 2011. The chart is compiled by Nielsen Soundscan and published by Jam! Canoe, issued every Sunday. The chart also appears in Billboard magazine as Top Canadian Albums.

Key
| † | Indicates best-performing album of 2011 |

| Issue date | Album | Artist | References |
|---|---|---|---|
| January 1 | The Gift | Susan Boyle | |
| January 8 | Loud | Rihanna | |
| January 15 | Loud | Rihanna | |
| January 22 | Loud | Rihanna | |
| January 29 | Loud | Rihanna | |
| February 5 | Doo-Wops & Hooligans | Bruno Mars | |
| February 12 | 2011 Grammy Nominees | Various Artists | |
| February 19 | Doo-Wops & Hooligans | Bruno Mars | |
| February 26 | Now! 17 | Various Artists | |
| March 5 | Never Say Never: The Remixes | Justin Bieber | |
| March 12 | 21 † | Adele | |
| March 19 | 21 † | Adele | |
| March 26 | 21 † | Adele | |
| April 2 | Endgame | Rise Against | |
| April 9 | La Musique en Moi | Ginette Reno | |
| April 16 | Femme Fatale | Britney Spears | |
| April 23 | 21 † | Adele | |
| April 30 | Wasting Light | Foo Fighters | |
| May 7 | 21 † | Adele | |
| May 14 | 21 † | Adele | |
| May 21 | 21 † | Adele | |
| May 28 | 21 † | Adele | |
| June 4 | 21 † | Adele | |
| June 11 | Born This Way | Lady Gaga | |
| June 18 | Born This Way | Lady Gaga | |
| June 25 | Little Hell | City and Colour | |
| July 2 | Hell: The Sequel | Bad Meets Evil | |
| July 9 | 21 † | Adele | |
| July 16 | 21 † | Adele | |
| July 23 | 21 † | Adele | |
| July 31 | 21 † | Adele | |
| August 6 | 21 † | Adele | |
| August 13 | 21 † | Adele | |
| August 20 | 21 † | Adele | |
| August 27 | Watch the Throne | Jay-Z, Kanye West | |
| September 3 | Watch the Throne | Jay-Z, Kanye West | |
| September 10 | 21 † | Adele | |
| September 17 | Tha Carter IV | Lil Wayne | |
| September 24 | 21 † | Adele | |
| October 1 | Own the Night | Lady Antebellum | |
| October 8 | 21 † | Adele | |
| October 15 | 21 † | Adele | |
| October 22 | 21 † | Adele | |
| October 29 | 21 † | Adele | |
| November 5 | 21 † | Adele | |
| November 12 | Mylo Xyloto | Coldplay | |
| November 19 | Under the Mistletoe | Justin Bieber | |
| November 26 | Christmas | Michael Bublé | |
| December 3 | Take Care | Drake | |
| December 10 | Here and Now | Nickelback | |
| December 17 | Christmas | Michael Bublé | |
| December 24 | Christmas | Michael Bublé | |
| December 31 | Christmas | Michael Bublé | |

== See also ==
- List of Canadian Hot 100 number-one singles of 2011
