= I Wanna Go =

2011 single by Britney Spears

Single by Britney Spears

from the album Femme Fatale
- Released: June 14, 2011
- Recorded: July 2009
- Studio: Maratone Studios (Stockholm)
- Genre: Dance-pop; Hi-NRG
- Length: 3:30
- Label: Jive
- Songwriters: Max Martin; Savan Kotecha; Shellback
- Producers: Max Martin; Shellback

Britney Spears singles chronology
"S&M" (remix) (2011)	"I Wanna Go" (2011)	"Criminal" (2011)

Music video
- "I Wanna Go" on YouTube

"I Wanna Go" is a song by American singer Britney Spears from her seventh studio album, Femme Fatale (2011). It was written and produced by Max Martin and Shellback, with additional writing by Savan Kotecha. Spears first posted on her Twitter account a link to a clip of the song in February 2011, a month prior to the album's release. Following a poll on her official website, "I Wanna Go" was chosen as the third single of the album, and Jive Records released it on June 14, 2011.

"I Wanna Go" is a dance-pop and Hi-NRG song that features a heavy bassline and drum fills reminiscent of English rock band New Order. The pre-chorus has a whistled hook that received comparisons to the music of Bob Sinclar and Frankie Knuckles. The lyrics of "I Wanna Go" feature Spears singing about losing inhibitions. The song received favorable reviews from critics, some praised it for being effective and highlighted its hook, while others dismissed the processed vocals. The song was treated with different remixes, including a Bollywood mix with guest vocals by Sonu Nigam and another one by DJ Frank E and Alex Dreamz.

After the release of Femme Fatale, "I Wanna Go" charted due to digital sales in the upper end of the US Billboard Hot 100 and the Canadian Hot 100, and also topped the South Korean International chart. Following its release as a single, the song reached the top ten in several music markets, including Canada, France, Finland and the United States. In the United States, "I Wanna Go" made Femme Fatale the first album by Spears to have three top ten singles and with Spears' best radio airplay performance.

An accompanying music video for the song, directed by Chris Marrs Piliero, premiered on June 22, 2011. It depicts Spears daydreaming at a press conference about a series of events, including being chased by paparazzi cyborgs and being rescued by actor Guillermo Díaz. Piliero described the video as "a ridiculous, exaggerated rumor about her life and career". The video references the films Half Baked, Crossroads, Terminator 2: Judgment Day and Michael Jackson's Thriller. It received positive reviews from critics, who praised its fun spirit. Spears has performed "I Wanna Go" on her Femme Fatale Tour (2011) and during her Las Vegas residency show Britney: Piece of Me (2013–2015).

== Background and artwork ==
"I Wanna Go" was written and produced by Max Martin and Shellback, with additional writing by Savan Kotecha. The song was written in 2009 and registered on Broadcast Music Incorporated under the legal title "I I I Wanna Go O O". On February 22, 2011, Spears posted on her Twitter account a link to a 29-second clip of the song, while calling Martin "amazing". In an interview with Rolling Stone, Spears stated that the song's signature whistle gets her "every time [she] hears it", adding that Martin's melodies are "Incredible ... Who would have thought of that? There is nobody I feel more comfortable collaborating with in the studio." Kotecha told Digital Spy in May 2011 that the song was likely a contender for third single due to positive reaction. On May 11, 2011, a poll was launched on Britney.com in which fans could choose the third single of the album. Two days later, "I Wanna Go" was officially announced as the third single from Femme Fatale by Jive Records through a press release after winning the poll. The cover art was revealed on June 6, 2011, and featured Spears on set of the music video, wearing colored hair extensions and crop top with a skeletal Mickey Mouse by designer Mila Fargo.

== Composition ==
"I Wanna Go" (2011)
A 21-second sample of the song's chorus, where Spears sings over a repetitive whistled arpeggio melody.

"I Wanna Go" is a dance-pop and hi-NRG song, which features a heavy bassline and drum fills; the latter are reminiscent of English band New Order's song "Blue Monday" (1983). Spears squeals and chuckles throughout the song, and her vocals are processed. In the pre-chorus, she draws out the "e"'s in lines such as "Shame on me / To need release / Uncontrollably." The section also has a whistled hook, which was compared by Rich Juzwiak of The Village Voice to the music of French recording artist Bob Sinclar and American recording artist Frankie Knuckles. In the chorus, Spears stutters "I-I-I wanna go-o-o/All the wa-a-ay/ Taking out my freak tonight". Ryan Brockington of the New York Post compared "I Wanna Go" to the music of her fifth studio album Blackout (2007). In the lyrics, Spears sings about losing inhibitions, as evident in lines such as "I-I-I wanna sho-o-ow/All the dir-ir-irt/I got (sic) running through my mind.", while playfully apologizing for her need for sexual release. Jon Caramanica of The New York Times stated that she sings about "the scrum that surrounds her" in "Lately people got me all tied up / There's a countdown waiting for me to erupt". According to the sheet music published by EMI Music Publishing, "I Wanna Go" is written in the key of D minor, with an electropop beat infused metronome of 130 beats per minute. Spears' vocals range from the low note of D_{3} to the high note of D_{5}.

== Critical reception ==
"I Wanna Go" received generally favorable reviews from music critics. A reviewer for Samesame.com.au called "I Wanna Go" Spears' best song since "Toxic", and added that "I’d go so far as to say that it is probably the best song that she has ever recorded. [...] How the decision was made that 'Hold It Against Me' would be a better first single over this is baffling". Parker Bruce of the Washington Square News stated that the song functions as "a sort of formal declaration and mission statement" for Femme Fatale, saying that "It is not an innovative song, but it is fantastically effective and endlessly enticing with its liberating, toss-your-cares-away, dance-like-a-complete–and-utter-fool cathartic chorus, repeated words and typically saucy Britney lyrics". The Daily Collegian writer Hannah Rishel said "I Wanna Go" would have been "another good lead single", while The Washington Times's Andrew Leahey said that along with "Till the World Ends", they are "bass-heavy tributes to club culture."

Robert Copsey of Digital Spy called it "anthemic" and noted the song would become a future single. Rich Juzwiak of The Village Voice called "I Wanna Go" the highlight of the album, and said "get ready for [it] to score your summer". However, Juzwiak went on to note that Spears' vocals are heavily manipulated to maximize the chorus's potential, even though "the joy she sings about is palpable". The Chicago Sun-Times journalist Thomas Conner also noted that the singer's vocals were processed to the point "these songs could be sung by anyone", exemplifying "'I Wanna Go' tweaks her up so high she could be Jackie Evancho". Andy Gill of The Independent also criticized the singer's vocals on Femme Fatale, stating that they sounded more programmed than natural, with "even the little whistling hook in 'I Wanna Go' has a synthetic character about it".

Sal Cinquemani of Slant Magazine noted that "If not for its infectious pre-chorus whistle, 'I Wanna Go' would be just another song off the Max Martin assembly line". The Guardian contributor Alexis Petridis gave the song a negative review, and said that although most of tracks of the album are "genuinely exciting [...] there's certainly some unremarkable stuff on offer, notably 'Seal It With a Kiss' and 'I Wanna Go'". Evan Sawdey of PopMatters also noted that "I Wanna Go" is the point of the album in which "things stop being fun and start becoming intensely repetitious", criticizing specifically "[the] utterly stupid set of syllables repeated ad nauseam for no reason whatsoever? [..] the 'ably' part of 'uncontrollably' gets recycled far beyond the point where it just sounds stupid". Nicholas Hautman, from Us Weekly, called it "so beyond AutoTuned at points that it could be Ozzy Osbourne singing for all we know". In September 2011, "I Wanna Go" topped Rolling Stone's reader's poll of The Best Songs of the Summer.

== Chart performance ==
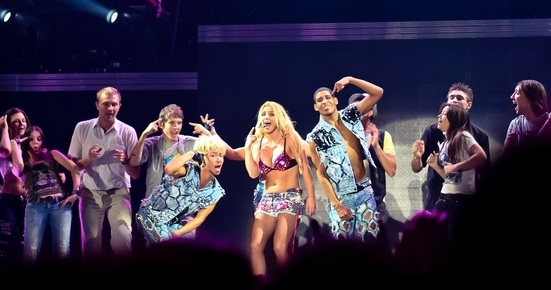
Spears, flanked by her dancers and fans, singing "I Wanna Go" on the Femme Fatale Tour

On the chart issue of April 3, 2011, "I Wanna Go" debuted at number 73 on the US Billboard Hot 100 chart, and at number 52 on the Hot Digital Songs component chart due to strong digital sales. The song debuted at number 60 on the Canadian Hot 100 on the chart issue of April 16, 2011. It also debuted at number one on South Korea's Gaon International Chart, and remained on the same position for three consecutive weeks. After its release as a single, the song debuted at number 37 on the Billboard Pop Songs chart on the chart issue of July 2, 2011. It also re-entered the Billboard Hot 100 at number 89. The following week, it surged up to number 29 on the Hot 100 due to the premiere of the music video, with sales of 67,000 copies (up 282% from the previous week). "I Wanna Go" became Spears's 21st top-forty single, the third-highest female total since her first week on the chart on November 21, 1998, and only behind Taylor Swift with 27 and Rihanna with 22.

On the chart issue of August 4, 2011, the song climbed from number 11 to number nine on the Billboard Hot 100, making Femme Fatale the first album by Spears to achieve three top ten singles. It became her fifth top ten single in a row, and her twelfth top ten entry overall, the third-highest female total since her first week on the chart, behind Rihanna with eighteen and Beyoncé Knowles with fifteen. "I Wanna Go" peaked at number seven on the Hot 100 on the chart issue of August 24, 2011. The song peaked atop the Pop Songs chart on September 24, 2011, becoming Spears' sixth single to top the chart, and setting a record for the longest span of number-one singles by an artist (12 years, seven months and four days). Spears scored her first number-one single on the chart with "...Baby One More Time" on the chart issue of February 20, 1999. She also tied Mariah Carey and Knowles for the third-highest female total of number-one singles. As of July 2016, "I Wanna Go" has sold 1,780,000 digital downloads in the United States. It is her eighth best-selling digital single in the country.

In Australia, "I Wanna Go" debuted at number 33 on the ARIA Singles Chart on the chart issue of July 10, 2011. It peaked at number 31 three weeks later, on July 31, 2011. The song became the third lowest peaking single of Spears' career in the country, after "Radar" (2009) at 46 and "From the Bottom of My Broken Heart" (1999) at 37. It spent nine weeks on the chart. It has since been certified gold by the Australian Recording Industry Association (ARIA) for sales of 35,000 units. In New Zealand, the song debuted at number 25 on the New Zealand Singles Chart, and peaked at number 22 the following week. It became her lowest peaking single since "Radar", and her sixth single to not enter the top twenty. The song spent 10 weeks on the chart. On July 7, 2011, "I Wanna Go" debuted at 41 on the Irish Singles Chart. It became her first single to not chart in the inside the top 100 in the United Kingdom, peaking at number 138 on the chart issue of June 9, 2011. Across Europe, the song has peaked at number five on Belgium (Flanders) and France; number 10 in Finland; the top twenty in Belgium (Wallonia), Norway and Denmark; and the top forty in Czech Republic and Sweden.

== Music video ==
=== Development ===
"Let me tell you, all of that is bulls[hit]. Every artist has management, that's their job. It's what they're paid for. I work with the artist. Your question goes along perfectly with the whole concept of the video and that press conference – it's a ridiculous, exaggerated rumor about her life and career. I met with her, talked with her, went over the concept with her. It was extremely collaborative. She suggested alternatives and tweaked other things. As much as the management is there, this was a concept that Britney really dug. She was a big part of the decision-making process."

— Chris Marrs Piliero, on how the rumors of Spears being 'a puppet' informed the concept of the music video.

The music video for "I Wanna Go" was directed by Chris Marrs Piliero and filmed in Los Angeles, California. Spears first contacted Piliero and asked him to put together a concept for the video. The main idea for Piliero came from the lyric "be a little inappropriate", which stood out for him, but he did not want to make a video about sexual inappropriateness. Piliero wrote the opening press conference scene as a tribute to the film Half Baked (1998), which he is a fan of. He explained, "That scene resonates with everyone as the epitome of the greatest way to quit your job, and just blow people off. [...] I felt like that would just be such a perfect way for her to tell the reporters to eff off." Marrs Piliero first asked actor Kellan Lutz to co-star the clip with Spears; however, Lutz turned down the role, saying that "there were a couple of weird things about the part that didn't make sense", including the scene where he was going to pour milk on himself. Piliero then thought of asking one of the stars of Half Baked, Guillermo Díaz, to be part of the video, explaining that it "would make it come full circle." Piliero watched all of Spears' videos and wanted to pull what he loved from them, but also give it something fresh. Piliero felt that all of her references to the paparazzi in her previous videos had been more of a statement than an action, and for "I Wanna Go", he wanted her to have the opportunity to fight back.

Piliero had the concept nearly finished by the time he met with Spears. Both wanted to explore fun ways for Spears to be inappropriate in the video, who had several ideas, such as a cop frisking her. Having seen Spears on How I Met Your Mother and Saturday Night Live, Piliero felt that none of her videos had really taken advantage of her comedic timing, saying, "She never had a music video where she could show her acting chops and have fun with comedy while being super badass. That was my goal from day one: I wanted her to be funny, badass and super cool." During the first day of the shoot, he requested Spears to "have as much fun as possible over these next two days". Piliero also stated that the Crossroads (2002) reference "[i]s a fun Easter egg for fans. Plus, Die Hard 2: Die Harder is the most ridiculously awesome way to title a sequel. It just felt like the right thing to do. When Britney saw it, she loved it."

=== Synopsis ===
Spears standing atop a yellow taxi. A marquee beside her reads Crossroads 2: Cross Harder, referencing her film debut Crossroads.

The video begins at a press conference where Spears, wearing a cropped Mickey Mouse Skull top by Mila Fargo (paying homage to her days in The New Mickey Mouse Club), is being asked inappropriate questions by news reporters, such as "Is it true you banned junk food, smiles, candy, sunshine and laughter from your Femme Fatale Tour?" and "Is it true that you hate puppies?" Angered by the questions, Spears replies (albeit censored): "Fuck you, fuck you, fuck you, you're cool, fuck you – I'm out", referencing a scene from the film Half Baked. After leaving the press conference, Spears walks out of the building and out into the street, wearing a white leather jacket and a black skirt with matching with studded combat boots. She signs a fan's copy of Femme Fatale and then blows a kiss to a baby as he whistles the melody of the chorus. As Spears walks along the street, she flashes several men, including a policeman (played by Adrien Galo). As a criminal offence, the policeman searches Spears, feeling up and down her legs, as she is bent over a car. Spears later walks away from the policeman, swinging handcuffs around her finger while he buttons his shirt.

She continues walking down the street, where she smashes the camera of a paparazzi photographer who takes pictures of her. More paparazzi appear as she runs away and jumps on top of a taxi. Spears then stands atop of it, wielding the microphone as a weapon against the paparazzi who are hassling her. Across the street, a marquee of the cinema besides her reads Crossroads 2: Cross Harder, referencing her film debut Crossroads. After all the paparazzi, revealed to be cyborgs, have been knocked to the floor, they start crawling back with their eyes glowing red and their faces bursting with wires, reminiscent to a scene in Terminator 2: Judgment Day (1991). A car suddenly pulls up near to Spears, and the driver Guillermo Díaz tells her to get inside. In the next scene, Spears dances in the passenger seat in a pink bikini top, as Guillermo drives. He attempts to drink some milk while driving but pours the carton of milk over his face. His chest starts to spark, and Spears pulls open his jacket to reveal that he too is a cyborg. The video then cuts back to the press conference, indicating that Spears was daydreaming, due to being asked monotonous and inappropriate questions. Guillermo steps in and leads Spears out of the room following him putting seashells in Spears' hand. Then, he turns to the camera with his eyes glowing red, and his laugh is heard, referencing Michael Jackson's Thriller (1983).

=== Release and reception ===
On June 17, 2011, Jive Records announced through a press release that an exclusive 30-second teaser would premiere on June 19, 2011, on Bravo's Watch What Happens: Live and on VEVO simultaneously. The full length video was revealed to premiere on MTV and Vevo on June 22, 2011. Following the premiere, the video was played hourly on MTV, during video hours, and on VH1's Best Morning Buzz Live. Jen McDonnell of Dose said, "damn if [the video] doesn't rock. [...] It all sounds very weird – and it is. But it's also buckets of fun." Megan Gibson of Time stated that the video is "random, weird and intended to be funny" and that despite the lack of dancing "Britney seems pleasantly energetic and spunky in 'I Wanna Go' which is a comforting change from her usual blank-eyed look." Sarah Anne Hughes of The Washington Post commented that the video "shows a much livelier Britney than the world has seen since the 'Toxic' years."

Jason Lipshutz of Billboard said that the video continues the visual representation of Spears' relationship with the paparazzi and her public image, as previously seen in the videos for "Everytime" (2004) and "Piece of Me" (2008), but "the new clip is arguably her most playful yet." Amos Barshad of New York stated the video "is awe-inspiring in almost exactly the way it intended to be" and that "the spirit of the song, as reflected in the video, is that of free will and dream fulfillment in the face of a repressive society." Jocelyn Vena of MTV commented that "Britney displays the sass and charm fans fell in love with a decade ago during performance shots, where she flirts with the camera, her eyes as big and wide as her smile." An editor for VH1 called the video "fan-freakin'-tastic" and compared it favorably to the music video for Katy Perry's "Last Friday Night (T.G.I.F.)" (2011), saying that "they share a silly temperament, a flirty star, and funny cameos. Upon closer examination, though, Britney's video blows Katy Perry's out of the water."

Devin Brown of CBS News called it her best video from Femme Fatale, and added that unlike "Piece of Me", "'I Wanna Go' offers a bevy of pop culture references meant to ridicule the rumors about the star – and finally no 'dancing.'" An editor from Rolling Stone said "The weirdness seems very calculated, but that doesn't make the video any less delightful." Another critic from Rolling Stone noted that the press conference "is hysterical because she's one of the least media-accessible singers in the world. It's easier to get a sit-down with Bob Dylan than it is with Britney." Becky Bain of Idolator called the video "delightful" and "flat out funny", explaining that Spears "focuses her energy on being too darn cute (and deliciously naughty) instead of having to worry about dancing, [she] is in on the joke and loving it all." The video was Spears' first to be Vevo Certified, which means that it was the first of her videos to have received over 100 million views on Vevo.

== Live performances, remixes and other versions ==
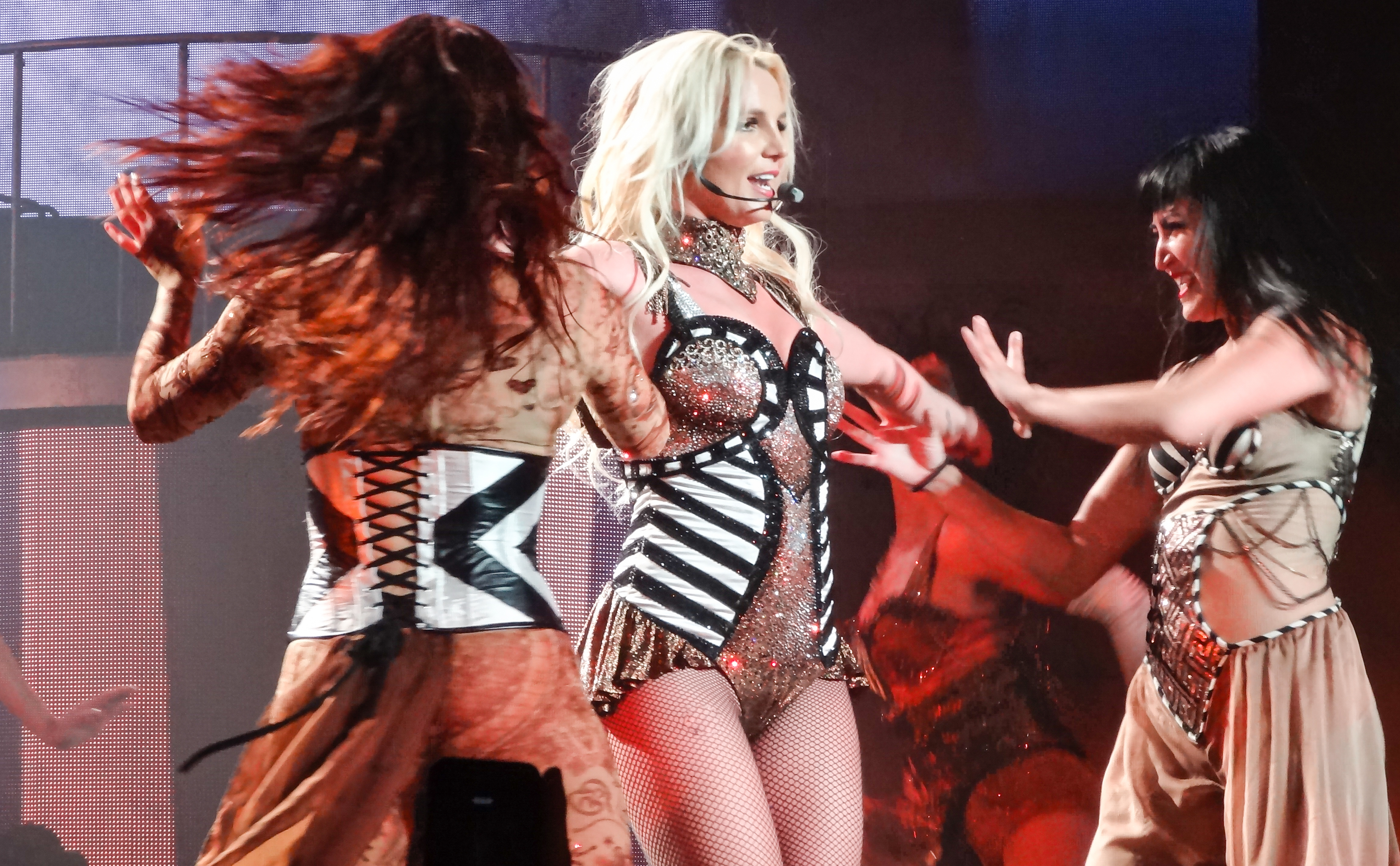
Spears, flanked by her dancers, performing "I Wanna Go" during her residency show Britney: Piece of Me in 2014

Though the song has never been performed live as part of a televised performance, "I Wanna Go" was featured on the set list of the Femme Fatale Tour (2011). Spears and her dancers bring fans onstage and dance with them throughout the performance. Shirley Halperin of The Hollywood Reporter stated that "[the] mid-tempo numbers [...] seemed to stall out quickly, where faster offerings like 'Womanizer,' 'I Wanna Go' and 'Toxic' had the sold out crowd jumping in place and pumping their number twos in the air." Shaunna Murphy of Entertainment Weekly said, "Of the newer songs, 'How I Roll' and 'I Wanna Go' were standouts, the former for its bubblegum fun and the latter for the uproarious fan participation on stage." Spears also included the song on her residency show in Las Vegas, Britney: Piece of Me. After a rendition of "Circus", a performance of "I Wanna Go" followed, where Spears dances with six mirror images of herself. The mirrors, that are moved around by her dancers, are screens showing pre-recorded images of the singer. Keith Caulfield from Billboard considered the performance "cool".

"I Wanna Go" was remixed with guest vocals by Indian singer Sonu Nigam and released on the DesiHits website in June 2011. In the remix, Sonu mirrors Spears' vocals in Hindi over Indian instruments. Spears said about the song, "I'm so excited about having Sonu on I Wanna Go. His vocals add such a different feel, which I love! Watch out Bollywood – it's Britney and Sonu!". A remix done by DJ Frank E and Alex Dreamz removes the whistled hook and adds an extra beat to the song. The accompanying video for the remix contains footage of the music video for the song with a glowing yellow tint. The version of the song that was published on her official SoundCloud page on June 12, 2011 contains an extended bridge before the final chorus, making the song 26 seconds longer than the standard version that appears in other streaming platforms and physical releases.

== Track listings ==
French CD single

1. "I Wanna Go" (main version) – 3:30
2. "I Wanna Go" (DJ Frank E & Alex Dreamz radio remix) – 3:18

German CD single

1. "I Wanna Go" (main version) – 3:30
2. "I Wanna Go" (Gareth Emery remix) – 5:26

Digital download

1. "I Wanna Go" – 3:30

Digital download (SoundCloud)

1. "I Wanna Go" – 3:56

Digital download (Desi Hits! remix)

1. "I Wanna Go" (Desi Hits! remix) – 4:37

Digital download (EP)

1. "I Wanna Go" – 3:30
2. "I Wanna Go" (Gareth Emery remix) – 5:25
3. "I Wanna Go" (Moguai remix) – 7:11
4. "I Wanna Go" (video) – 4:33

Digital download (UK remixes)

1. "I Wanna Go" (Gareth Emery remix) – 5:25
2. "I Wanna Go" (Vada remix) – 7:39
3. "I Wanna Go" (Moguai remix) – 7:11
4. "I Wanna Go" (Pete Phantom remix) – 3:18

Digital download (remixes)

1. "I Wanna Go" – 3:30
2. "I Wanna Go" (Captain Cuts club mix) – 4:43
3. "I Wanna Go" (Alex Dreamz radio edit) – 4:07
4. "I Wanna Go" (OLIVER extended remix) – 4:57
5. "I Wanna Go" (Deluka BS radio remix) – 3:15
6. "I Wanna Go" (Wallpaper extended remix) – 4:03
7. "I Wanna Go" (Smash Mode radio remix) – 3:49
8. "I Wanna Go" (Disco Fries radio remix) – 3:34
9. "I Wanna Go" (Jump Smokers radio remix) – 4:51
10. "I Wanna Go" (Desi Hits! remix) – 4:36

== Credits and personnel ==
Credits adapted from Femme Fatale booklet liner notes.

- Britney Spears – lead vocals
- Max Martin – songwriter, producer and keyboards
- Shellback – songwriter, producer, guitars, keyboards and bass
- Savan Kotecha – songwriter and background vocals
- Chau Phan – background vocals
- John Hanes – engineering
- Tim Roberts – engineering
- Serban Ghenea – audio mixing

== Charts ==
=== Weekly charts ===
Chart (2011)	Peak position
Australia (ARIA)	31
Austria (Ö3 Austria Top 40)	43
Belgium (Ultratop 50 Flanders)	15
Belgium (Ultratop 50 Wallonia)	5
Brazil (Brasil Hot 100 Airplay)	25
Brazil (Brasil Hot Pop Songs)	3
Canada Hot 100 (Billboard)	5
Canada CHR/Top 40 (Billboard)	1
Canada Hot AC (Billboard)	4
CIS Airplay (TopHit)	46
Croatia International Airplay (Top lista)	12
Czech Republic Airplay (ČNS IFPI)	19
Denmark (Tracklisten)	20
Finland (Suomen virallinen lista)	10
France (SNEP)	5
France Download (SNEP)	6
Germany (GfK)	32
Global Dance (Billboard)	12
Hungary (Rádiós Top 40)	13
Hungary (Single Top 40)	3
Ireland (IRMA)	41
Israel International Airplay (Media Forest)	1
Italy (FIMI)	43
Japan Hot 100 (Billboard)	71
Lebanon (Lebanese Top 20)	5
Mexico Airplay (Billboard)	26
Mexico Anglo Airplay (Monitor Latino)	8
Netherlands (Dutch Top 40 Tipparade)	20
New Zealand (Recorded Music NZ)	22
Norway (VG-lista)	18
Poland Airplay (ZPAV)	5
Russia Airplay (TopHit)	43
Slovakia (Rádio Top 100)	1
South Korea (Gaon Digital Chart)	54
South Korea International (Circle)	1
Spain (Promusicae)	41
Spain Airplay (PROMUSICAE)	8
Switzerland (Schweizer Hitparade)	27
Sweden (Sverigetopplistan)	30
Ukraine Airplay (TopHit)	188
UK Singles (OCC)	111
US Billboard Hot 100	7
US Adult Pop Airplay (Billboard)	22
US Dance Club Songs (Billboard)	1
US Dance Airplay (Billboard)	1
US Pop Airplay (Billboard)	1
US Rhythmic Airplay (Billboard)	14

==== John Summit Remix ====
Chart (2025)	Peak position
New Zealand Hot Singles (RMNZ)	21
US Hot Dance/Electronic Songs (Billboard)	22

=== Monthly charts ===
Chart (2011)	Peak position
South Korea (Circle)	57

=== Year-end charts ===
Chart (2011)	Position
Belgium (Ultratop 50 Flanders)	62
Brazil (Crowley Broadcast Analysis)	44
Canada (Canadian Hot 100)	33
CIS (TopHit)	178
Croatia Airplay (HRT)	54
France (SNEP)	45
France Airplay (SNEP)	21
Hungary (Rádiós Top 40)	99
Lebanon (Lebanese Top 20)	22
South Korea Foreign (Circle)	15
US Billboard Hot 100	46
US Dance Club Songs (Billboard)	39
US Dance/Mix Show Airplay (Billboard)	31
US Mainstream Top 40 (Billboard)	13
US Radio Songs (Billboard)	37

== Certifications and sales ==
Region	Certification	Certified units/sales
Australia (ARIA)	Gold	35,000^{^}
France	—	83,700
South Korea	—	536,491
Sweden (GLF)	Platinum	40,000^{‡}
United States (RIAA)	2× Platinum	2,000,000^{‡}
^{^} Shipments figures based on certification alone.^{‡} Sales+streaming figures based on certification alone.

== Release history ==
Country	Date	Format	Label
Europe	June 13, 2011	Digital download – promotional release	Jive Records
United States	June 14, 2011	Mainstream radio	Jive Records
Denmark	June 21, 2011	Digital download	Jive Records
France	June 21, 2011	Digital download	Jive Records
Italy	June 21, 2011	Digital download	Jive Records
Netherlands	June 21, 2011	Digital download	Jive Records
Spain	June 21, 2011	Digital download	Jive Records
Brazil	June 27, 2011	Digital download	Sony BMG
Brazil	July 11, 2011	Desi Hits! Remix	Sony BMG
United States	July 15, 2011	Remixes	Jive Records
Germany	July 22, 2011	CD single	Sony Music Entertainment
United Kingdom	July 29, 2011	Digital EP	RCA Records
Brazil	August 1, 2011	Digital EP	Sony BMG
France	September 5, 2011	CD single	Sony Music Entertainment

== See also ==
- List of Billboard Dance Club Songs number ones of 2011
