= Hold It Against Me =

2011 single by Britney Spears

Single by Britney Spears

from the album Femme Fatale
- Released: January 10, 2011
- Recorded: 2010
- Studio: Conway Studios, Dr. Luke's (Los Angeles)
- Genre: Dance-pop
- Length: 3:49
- Label: Jive
- Songwriters: Max Martin; Lukasz Gottwald; Bonnie McKee
- Producers: Dr. Luke; Max Martin; Billboard

Britney Spears singles chronology
| "3" (2009) | "Hold It Against Me" (2011) | "Till the World Ends" (2011) |

Music video
- "Hold It Against Me" on YouTube

"Hold It Against Me" is a song by American singer Britney Spears from her seventh studio album, Femme Fatale (2011). It was written and produced by Max Martin, Dr. Luke and Billboard, with additional writing by Bonnie McKee. Luke explained that he wanted "Hold It Against Me" to sound unlike his previous productions. The song was originally offered to Katy Perry, but Luke and Martin felt that it did not suit her. A demo version of the track by McKee was leaked on January 6, 2011, and the single became available for streaming on January 10, 2011. It was released for digital download the following day as the lead single from Femme Fatale by Jive Records.

Musically, "Hold It Against Me" blends pulsating industrial and dance beats with elements of electropop and trance. The chorus has lilting synths that lift her vocals and contrast them with the hard beats. The song features a dubstep-influenced breakdown, in which Spears moans and blows kisses, and the song ends with a final chorus with elements of rave. The lyrics portray the singer seducing someone on the dance floor, and the chorus revolves around pick-up lines. After the song was released, the Bellamy Brothers criticized it for being similar to their 1979 hit "If I Said You Have a Beautiful Body Would You Hold It Against Me". They were sued by Martin, Luke, McKee and Billboard for defamation and libel, but the case was dismissed after the Bellamy Brothers apologized. McKee stated in an interview that the title was inspired by a discussion she had with Katy Perry about the latter's body.

"Hold It Against Me" was met with positive reviews from most critics, although some criticized its lyrical content. The song debuted at number one in Belgium (Wallonia), Canada, Denmark, Finland and New Zealand, as well as on the US Billboard Hot 100, where it became her fourth chart topper. In the latter, it made Spears the second artist in Billboard's history to debut at number one more than once, and to achieve that with a second consecutive single, both behind Mariah Carey. The feat also made her the seventh artist to score number one singles in three consecutive decades. The single has also charted in the top five in countries such as Australia, Ireland, Italy, Scotland, and Norway.

The accompanying music video for the song was directed by Jonas Åkerlund. It premiered on February 17, 2011, following a two-week promotional campaign of teasers. The video features Spears as a pop star who fell from space to find fame on Earth. There, she becomes overwhelmed by the pressures of being a celebrity and breaks down. The video received mixed to positive reviews; critics complimented its artistic concept and visuals, but dismissed the use of product placement. Spears performed "Hold It Against Me" at Rain Nightclub, Good Morning America and Jimmy Kimmel Live!. She has also performed it as the opening number of the Femme Fatale Tour (2011).

== Background ==
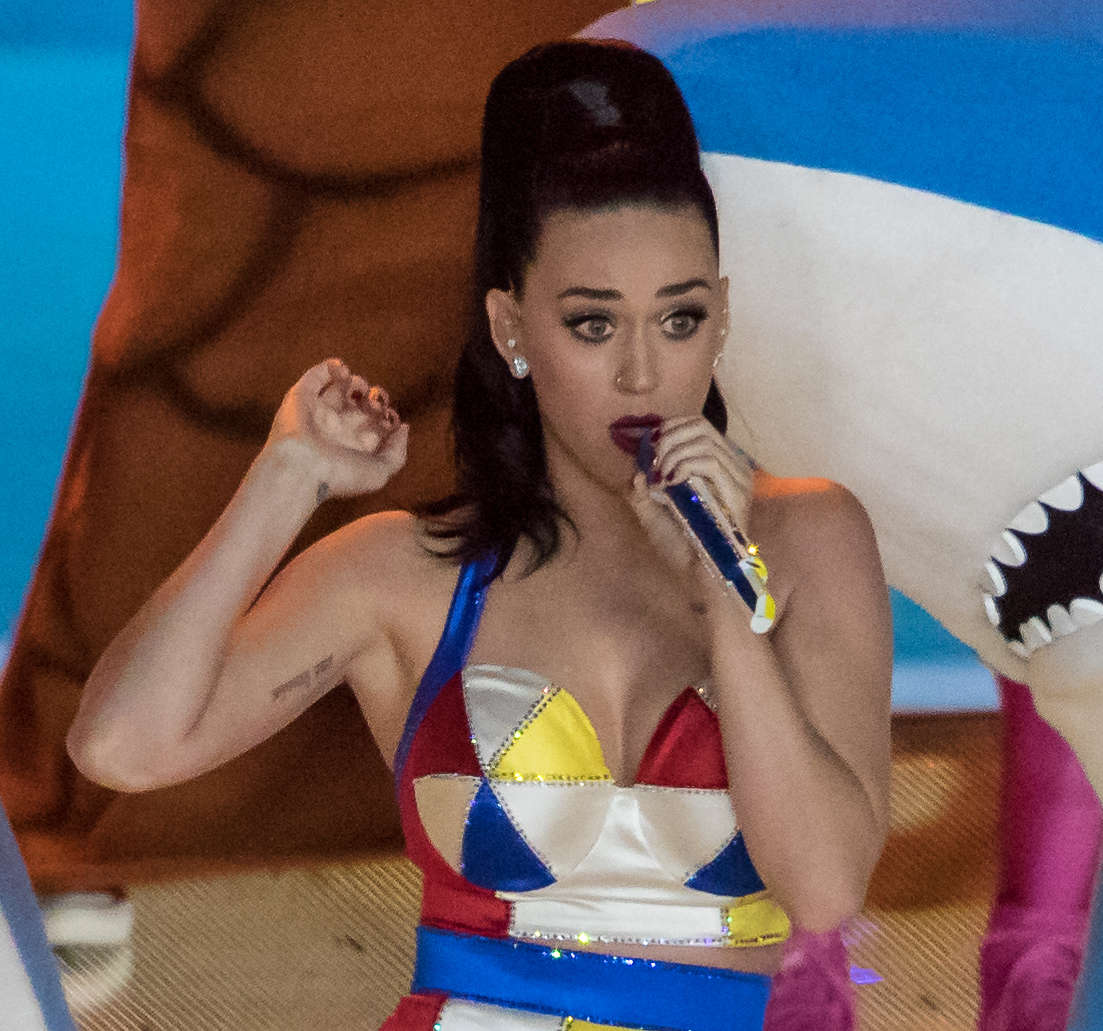
Katy Perry (pictured) inspired the song and its writers originally planned to offer it to her.

"Hold It Against Me" was written and produced by Max Martin, Dr. Luke and Billboard, with additional writing by Bonnie McKee. It was inspired by a moment when McKee saw American recording artist Katy Perry wearing a tight dress and joked "Damn Katy, if I told you you had a nice body would you hold it against me?" After it was written, Luke and Martin wanted to give the track to Perry, but they decided that "it definitely wasn't a Katy Perry record." They continued to work on the song with Billboard; Luke commented, "I wanted to make sure it didn't sound like everything else I've done. [...] It can be hard in the verse, and the bridge is super, super hard, but the chorus is super-pop." After rumored lyrics for the song surfaced on the web, Luke commented in his Twitter account on December 9, 2010, "I / we never wrote a song called 'don't hold it against me'.... BewaRe of InaccuraTe info kids ;-) We did write 'hold it against me' but those lyrics are NOT the lyrics ...." It was reported by news outlets that "Hold It Against Me" would premiere on January 7, 2011. However, this was denied by Spears' manager Adam Leber. An early demo of the track performed by McKee was leaked on January 6, 2011. Spears released the cover art for the song that same day and commented via Twitter, "Heard an early demo of my new single leaked. If u think that's good, wait til you hear the real one Tuesday."

On January 10, 2011, the single became available for streaming on Ryan Seacrest's website, who premiered it on his radio show shortly after. Spears tweeted, "Don't #HOLDITAGAINSTME for coming out early. I couldn't wait any longer. Hope you don't mind....." The radio premiere caused several sites to crash after they received too much traffic searching about the song. "Hold It Against Me" was released digitally in the United States and Canada at the iTunes Store at 00:00 EST (05:00 UTC), where it was available exclusively until January 18, 2011. The single was going to be released in the United Kingdom on February 20, 2011, but the date was moved up to January 17, 2011, due to overwhelming demand.

== Composition ==
"Hold It Against Me"
A 22-second sample of the song's final chorus, which has a smattering of rave chords that contrast with Spears singing "If I said I want your body now, would you hold it against me?".

"Hold It Against Me" is three minutes and forty-nine seconds long. It is a dance-pop song that blends pulsating industrial and trance beats with elements of grime. Spears' vocals have been described as "a bit treated" but not heavily Auto-Tuned. The chorus, reminiscent of other pop productions by Max Martin, has lilting synths that lift her vocals and contrast them with the hard beats. After the second chorus, the beats drop and Spears speaks the lines in the hook. This is followed by a dubstep-influenced breakdown, which lasts about thirty seconds. Spears moans, blows kisses and sings the lines "Gimme something good, don't wanna wait I want it now / Pop it like a hood and show me how you work it out." "Hold It Against Me" continues with a second breakdown, which is more similar to the sound of the track. The final chorus has a smattering of rave chords and the song has a sudden end.

Rob Sheffield of Rolling Stone commented that the song "recalls the synth-gloom ambience of Britney's 2007 gem, Blackout." He also compared the riff to AC/DC's "Dirty Deeds Done Dirt Cheap" (1976). Ann Powers of the Los Angeles Times found the song's hook reminiscent of "(I Just) Died in Your Arms" (1986) by Cutting Crew. Nick Levine of Digital Spy felt the song had a "clubby and au courant" feel, comparable to "Only Girl (In the World)" (2010) by Barbadian recording artist Rihanna. According to the sheet music published at Musicnotes.com by Kobalt Music Publishing Inc., "Hold It Against Me" is set in the compound meter time signature, with a moderate dance beat infused metronome of 133 beats per minute. Lyrically, "Hold It Against Me" talks about seducing someone on the dancefloor. The chorus revolves around pick-up lines; Spears sings, "If I said I want your body now, would you hold it against me?" and "'Cause you feel like paradise, and I need a vacation tonight." James Montgomery of MTV compared the feeling of the lyrics to that of "If U Seek Amy" (2009).

=== Controversy ===
After "Hold It Against Me" was released, the Bellamy Brothers criticized it for being similar to their 1979 hit "If I Said You Had a Beautiful Body Would You Hold It Against Me". In a statement, David Bellamy said "professionally, well, in all honesty, we feel completely ripped off. Where's the originality?" The brothers's attorney Christopher E. Schmidt stated that "[it] becomes somewhat uncanny if you simply double the beat of the Bellamy Brothers' song and match it up with Britney's version" and pointed out that it was not the first time Martin and Luke were accused of copyright infringement. On March 2, 2011, Martin, Luke, McKee and Billboard filed a lawsuit in which they accused the brothers of making defamatory and libelous statements about them. The case was dismissed on August 11, 2011. The Bellamy Brothers released a statement that said, "The Bellamy Brothers apologise to Dr. Luke and Max Martin for the Bellamys' public statements and any false impressions suggested by the statements on their website that Dr. Luke and Max Martin copy the works of others."

== Critical reception ==
"Hold It Against Me" has received mostly positive reviews from most critics. Rick Florino of website Artistdirect gave the song four and half stars, calling it "one of Britney's catchiest club bangers yet" and saying "[it] proudly stands alongside Britney classics like 'Womanizer', 'Gimme More', and 'Toxic', but there's a refined ethereal elegance to it that sees Britney stepping into new territory and pushing the boundaries of dance pop once more." Nick Levine of website Digital Spy said that although "Hold It Against Me" was produced by Luke and Martin, the finished product was not similar to songs by regular collaborators Kesha and Katy Perry, but actually "sounds like a bang-up-to-date Britney tune for 2011." Brad Wete of Entertainment Weekly said "'Against Me' is classic Britney — that is to say the vocal performance is far from stellar, but it serves as a nice accessory to [Luke and Martin]'s thumping Euro techno groove." He also added that Spears did not evolve with the lyrics she sings, and that there was not much growth when compared to singles such as "...Baby One More Time" (1998) or "I'm a Slave 4 U" (2001).

Greg Kot of the Chicago Tribune commented, "It's one of the tougher-sounding Spears singles yet and should do the job as a dancefloor-filler for listeners who are starting to wear out on the latest singles from Katy Perry and the Black Eyed Peas". However, he also dismissed the lyrical content and said that Spears sounds "bored [...] as is the case with most of her recent work." Michael Cragg of British newspaper The Guardian called it "decent enough." Rob Sheffield of Rolling Stone referred to the song as "prime Britney" and stated that it "promises great things for her album." Jim Cantiello of MTV felt the use of pick-up lines was silly, but praised the beat and the vocals, while calling the breakdown "awesome". Jim Farber of the Daily News called it "a dance-ready club song" and added, "With all that behind her, the 'Oops' girl may yet do it again", referencing her hit "Oops!... I Did It Again" (2000).

Edna Gundersen of USA Today criticized the use of pick-up lines, but said the single "delivers enough dizzying dance-pop ecstasy to ensure another chart-topping ride." Bill Lamb of About.com called it "one of the most mature dance pop songs" of Spears' career, praising the chorus structure and the electropop bridge. Lamb stated, "The pop music of 2011 has an early shot in the arm here. ['Hold It Against Me'] will quickly take its place among Britney Spears' best singles." Music website Popjustice positively compared the song to the leaked demo, saying that although the lyrics and melody were not different, Spears' finished version "is approximately 1000 times better than the demo. It's a harder, more urgent, extremely epic statement track that sounds like the work of a superstar." Glenn Gamboa of Newsday stated that "Hold It Against Me" was "a bit safer [...] like her current low-key, non-tabloid persona." Canadian newspaper The Globe and Mail's J.D. Considine called the reworking of the Bellamy Brothers' song "lame", but concluded that the track was "perfect ear candy", calling it "lust made audible".

== Chart performance ==
After its first day of release in the United States, "Hold It Against Me" set the record for most radio plays during a first day, registering 619 plays on Mediabase and 595 plays on Nielsen Broadcast Data Systems (BDS). The song broke Mediabase's record for the largest spin-increase in a single week, registering 3,866 more spins. Billboard reported that it was likely to debut at the top of the Billboard Hot 100, due to high airplay and sales, which were expected to exceed 400,000 copies. On the issue dated January 29, 2011, "Hold It Against Me" debuted at number one on the Hot 100, making Spears the second artist in history to debut multiple songs at the top of the chart, behind only Mariah Carey. The single is also the eighteenth song to debut at number one, and Spears' fourth chart-topper. "Hold It Against Me" made Spears the third female artist, behind Madonna and Janet Jackson, to top the Hot 100 in three decades, as well as the seventh artist overall. In 2012, it was voted as the best song to reach the top position on the Hot 100 over the past two years, in Billboard's "Hot 100 March Madness" poll for readers.

"Hold It Against Me" also debuted atop the Hot Digital Songs chart, with 411,000 copies sold. The sum marked the most downloads in a first week by a female artist, beating the previous record held by Taylor Swift's "Today Was a Fairytale" (2010). The current record is held by Adele, with her 2015 single "Hello" selling 1,112,000 downloads in its first week. It is also Spears' biggest sales week total, as well as the fifth biggest first-week sales tally in digital history. In seven weeks, "Hold It Against Me" topped one million downloads, becoming her eighth song with at least a million copies sold. "Hold It Against Me" debuted at number sixteen on Billboard's Pop Songs chart with 4,071 plays, the highest detections total by a new entry in the chart's history. It was also tied with Madonna's "Frozen" (1998) for the second highest debut, behind Carey's "Dreamlover" (1993). The following week, it climbed to number ten, becoming the seventh song in history to reach the top ten in only two weeks, as well as the first to do so in six years. On Radio Songs, "Hold It Against Me" debuted at number twenty-three with 45 million first-week audience impressions, which according to Nielsen BDS, is the highest debut on the chart since Carey's "Touch My Body" (2008). As of March 2015, "Hold It Against Me" has sold 1.6 million digital downloads in the United States.

The song debuted on the ARIA Charts of Australia at number ten, and peaked at number four the following week. It became her eleventh top five entry and her ninth highest-peaking single. The song stayed on the charts for twelve weeks. It has since been certified platinum by the Australian Recording Industry Association (ARIA) for sales of 70,000 units. On January 17, 2011, "Hold It Against Me" debuted atop the New Zealand RIANZ charts, becoming her fourth number one single. However, it only stayed on the charts for eight weeks. On January 13, 2011, the song debuted at number six on the Irish Singles Chart, and moved up to number five the following week. The single also debuted atop the Canadian Hot 100, becoming Spears' fourth Canadian number one single as well as the sixth song in the chart's history to debut at number one. With digital sales of 37,000 copies, "Hold It Against Me" also debuted at number one on Canada's Digital Songs chart, the highest debut sales total, and the second highest one week sales behind The Black Eyed Peas's "The Time (Dirty Bit)" (2010). It debuted at number eleven on the country's Hot 100 Airplay chart, the highest debut since Michael Bublé's "Haven't Met You Yet" (2009) as well as entering the Top 40/CHR airplay chart at number twelve, the second highest debut in the last five years, only behind Madonna's "4 Minutes" (2008). After its release in the United Kingdom, "Hold It Against Me" debuted at number six on the UK Singles Chart, becoming Spears' 21st top ten entry. However, it was her lowest-peaking lead single from a studio release. Across Europe, the song has peaked at the top of the charts in Belgium (Wallonia), Denmark and Finland; number two in Belgium (Flanders), Italy and Norway; number six in Spain; number seven in Switzerland; and the top twenty in Austria, Czech Republic and the Netherlands.

== Music video ==
=== Development ===
"We're playing it safe, we're not trying to kill ourselves yet, but as the video comes closer and closer, we'll definitely be hurting our backs. There was a moment while we were rehearsing where I showed Britney a section and it was something I really wanted her to do, and she freaked out. ... It's crazy when you first see something like that, how overwhelming it can be, especially when you haven't been in the [dance] studio for a year. [...] I think you can expect the unexpected from Britney. She is taking risks when it comes to fashion, when it comes to choreography, when it comes to this music — she's grown up so much, and she's pushing 30 years old soon, so she's a strong independent woman and I think she wants to show that."

— Brian Friedman talking to MTV about the music video.

The music video for "Hold It Against Me" was filmed on January 22 and 23, 2011. It was directed by Jonas Åkerlund, while Brian Friedman served as the choreographer. According to Spears' manager Larry Rudolph, she became a fan of Åkerlund's work after seeing the video for Madonna's "Ray of Light" (1998), but they had not worked together in the past, owing to "his availability or her timing". Spears and Åkerlund quickly got together to create the concept, presenting different ideas until, according to Rudolph, "[the concept] took a life on its own". Open auditions were held on December 22, 2010, and the dancers had to learn a routine set to Robyn's "Criminal Intent" (2010).

On January 22, 2011, Spears tweeted from the video shoot, saying it was "an incredible experience" and would "be one of the best videos I have ever done." On February 2, 2011, accusations came from TMZ that Åkerlund had decided to use a dance double for Spears when it seemed like she had not rehearsed her moves enough. Both her representatives and the director denied the rumors, and Åkerlund commenting, "[Britney's] been great throughout the entire process. [...] I've been around long enough to know when an artist gives it their all, and to me it doesn't get better than this. This video is gonna be fucking awesome! It's all Britney." Her manager Larry Rudolph later confirmed that a body double was actually used, but only for the scenes in which Spears fights herself. The fight scene was choreographed by Steven Ho. He commented that Spears incorporated the moves learned during rehearsals, but also incorporated "her own flavor", by adding a small shuffle of steps in her heels. The length of the dresses also presented a problem, and there were discussions about shortening the trains for safety issues. They were later added as 'weapons', as Ho explained, "as if they were sharp blades, giving Britney reason to jump and evade around them."

Friedman revealed that Jonas' wife, B. Åkerlund, was the stylist for the video. B. is known for her work with Madonna and Lady Gaga, but Friedman assured that "it is not 'Britney does Gaga.'" B. later commented about the fashion of the video, saying, "We were going for a punk-rock couture look in this video, with a touch of glam." For the wedding dress scene, B. worked with Tom Tom fashions to create a custom-made dress. Swarovski crystals were used for the "arm creations"; a necklace by Dannijo and gloves by La Cracia were added as accessories. For the fight scene, both Spears and her double wear custom dresses by B., in collaboration with Falguni and Shane Peacock, and also sport stilettos by XTC. During her dance sequence, Spears wears an outfit created by B. and Skin Graft Designs, with jewelry by Tom Binns. The boots were Spears' own, and completely bedazzled with Swarovski crystals. For the microphone sequence, Spears rocks a red look described as "skull shoulders", designed by Yasmen Hussein for Swarovski Runway Rocks. She completes the look with earrings and a necklace by Tom Binns and rings by Loree Rodkin. For the finale scene, Spears wears a custom skintight black dress by Bordelle, complete with garters. She accessorizes the look with a necklace by Noir and boots decorated with Swarovski crystals. After its release, the music video earned Spears $500,000 for the product placement by Sony, Make Up For Ever and PlentyofFish.

=== Synopsis ===
The scene of Spears spraying paint inside the metal room is reminiscent of Madonna's music video for "Bedtime Story".

The main idea behind the video is the rise, fall, and revival of Spears herself. The video begins when a meteoroid heads for Earth, and lights up a city when it finally lands, symbolizing Spears' entrance to fame and her skyrocketing career in the late 1990s as she became a household name. After this, black-and-white interspersed scenes of Spears getting ready in a soundstage are shown, while the words "Britney Spears" and "Hold It Against Me" appear in Def Leppard-inspired multicolored letters. Spears is then seen wearing shorts and showing her bare midriff in the soundstage, while her dancers in white are getting dressed around her. They are surrounded by cameras and lights, symbolizing her constantly being under the microscope and hounded by the media. As the first chorus begins, Spears appears wearing a white wedding dress inside a cylinder-shaped metal room with wires. The futuristic set and flowing dress are reminiscent of Madonna's music video for "Bedtime Story" (1995). She is seen rising up the cylinder-shaped metal room and her past music videos surround her, symbolizing her ever-growing career in the music industry (and possibly referring to the carousel of Logan's Run). When the second verse begins, Spears sings, wearing sparkly red skull-shaped shoulder pads, with microphones around her.

A pastiche of following scenes alternates between Spears dancing on the soundstage, singing with the microphones and a scene of just red lips, a reference to the opening shot of the 1975 film The Rocky Horror Picture Show. This begins to show her losing grip, reminiscent of her break down. When the breakdown starts, she begins to eject painting through IVs in her fingers, staining the room and the monitors, symbolizing her own fall as her name becomes tainted. Then, two versions of Spears, both wearing blue and red dresses with flowing trains, are seen fighting each other, another symbolism, this time of her fighting her inner demons. After this, both versions of Spears, as well as her on the wedding dress, fall exhausted to the ground, symbolizing the lowest point of her life during the breakdown. While interspersed scenes of Spears in the soundstage are shown, the other versions of herself start to wake up, showing her getting her feet back on the ground and making a comeback, refusing to give up. The final scene shows Spears dressed in a short black dress with her dancers in black on a stage, with confetti and pyrotechnics around them. In the final shot a question mark (?) appears in multicolored letters. This final scene shows her as she once was, a superstar who is back to reclaim her title. The video ends with the same multicolored lettering of a question mark, symbolizing the unknown that is to come.

=== Release and reception ===
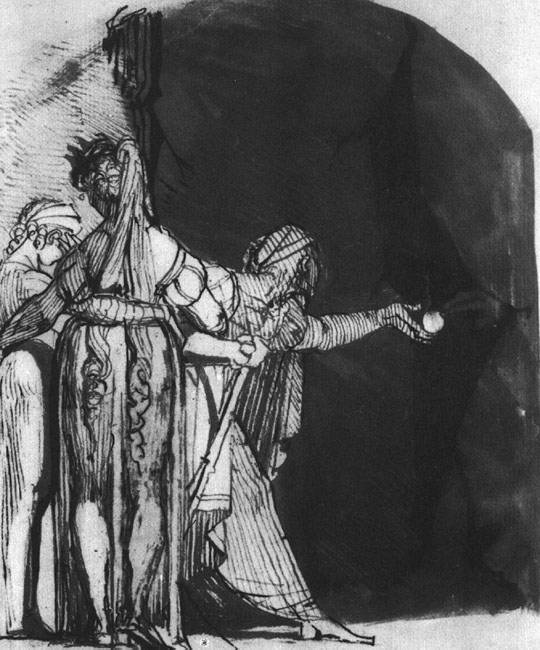
The hooded dancers in the metal room scenes were compared to the Graeae, three sisters who shared a single eye in Greek mythology.

Spears announced through her Twitter account on February 4, 2011, that one teaser would be posted daily during fourteen days. The first teaser posted featured Spears in a flowing white gown, surrounded by TV screens as a light and camera are pointed at her face. Other teasers featured Spears wearing the red outfit, her in the midst of a dance sequence with male dancers, and TV screens showcasing her past music videos. James Montgomery of MTV called the teasers "brilliant" and commented that they "earn[ed] her a spot in promotional history", comparing Spears' and her team use of social media to past campaigns by Kanye West, Radiohead and iamamiwhoami. On February 6, 2011, she tweeted, "Just saw a new cut of #HIAM. SOOOO excited to share it!" The music video premiered on MTV on February 17, 2011, at 21:55 EST (2:55 UTC). It was followed by a live discussion with special guests on MTV.com at 23:00 EST (04:00 UTC).

James Montgomery from MTV said that while the video surpassed her most iconic clips in terms of sheer spectacle, it still displayed a level on restraint in its themes. He summarized the review by saying it was one of her all-time best videos, adding that "there's genuine art to it, which makes it both beautiful to look at and powerful." Montgomery also found that the video was inspired by the Graeae, iamamiwhoami, Kanye West's short film Runaway, the music videos for Robyn's "Indestructible", Madonna's "Bedtime Story" and "Die Another Day", The Matrix franchise, Mortal Kombat, The Rocky Horror Picture Show and the Cam de Leon painting Ocular Orifice, which served as one of several covers of the Tool album Ænima. Matthew Perpetua of Rolling Stone called it "a total visual assault", and added that it "is a mix of everything we've come to expect from Britney", such as sexy costumes and elaborate choreography. Aaron Parsley of People believed that the fight sequence was the highlight of the video, but dismissed the product placement. Bill Lamb of About.com said the video was visually stellar, although he added that it was "difficult to know" if it would "match the impact of" clips such as "Baby One More Time" and "Toxic". Willa Paskin of New York deemed it as "a high-energy, professional, dance video", but stated that "[the visuals] make up for the basic fact that she isn't in the dancing shape, or really, performing shape she once was."

Leah Greenblatt of Entertainment Weekly commended the direction of Åkerlund, but criticized Spears for her lack of involvement, and commented, "It's hard not to wonder: Is Britney having any fun?" Ed Masley of The Arizona Republic stated the video lived up to hype of the teasers, and added that it was unquestionably one of her "artier" videos to date. Drew Grant of Salon.com said that despite the product placement, the video "[i]s visually stunning, with a Matrix meets The Cell vibe that will have Lady Gaga wishing she had thought of IV paint drips first." Alex Catarinella of The Huffington Post deemed it as her greatest and most mature work, and said the video was ultimately simple in its concept, and added, "The once picture-perfect pop star has returned and is offering fans the new, worn-and-torn and yes, stronger than yesterday Britney." The use of product placement received criticism from the media. Megan Gibson of Time said that the video was "borderline insulting" and commented, "we get that it's hard economic times all around, but couldn't they have been a tad more subtle with [it]?". Liz Kelly of The Washington Post called the clip "an infomercial" and said, "I would write more, but suddenly feel the need to put on some Make Up Forever and dash out to buy a Sony flat screen TV." "Hold It Against Me" video got a certified in the digital platform Vevo on YouTube.

== Live performances ==
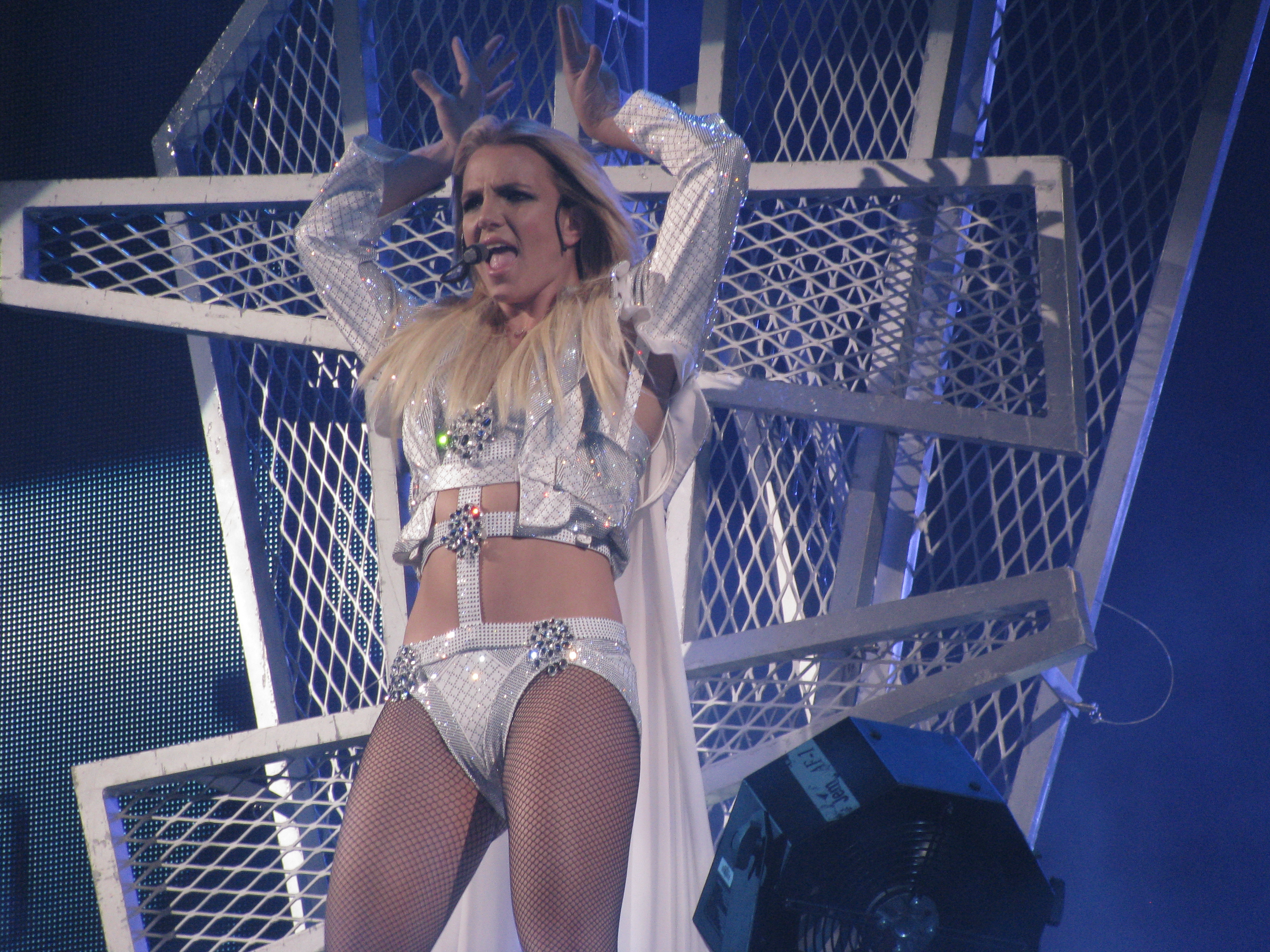
Spears performing "Hold It Against Me" at the Femme Fatale Tour

Spears first performed "Hold It Against Me" at Rain Nightclub in the Palms Casino Resort on March 25, 2011. Following a montage of her music videos, Spears appeared onstage wearing a sequined bodysuit and was flanked by male dancers. According to Jocelyn Vena of MTV, the performance "included sexy hair-tossing and a wind machine." She also performed "Big Fat Bass" and "Till the World Ends". Spears also taped performances of the songs at the Bill Graham Civic Auditorium on March 27, 2011, that aired on Good Morning America on March 29, 2011. The same day, Spears performed "Hold It Against Me", "Big Fat Bass" and "Till the World Ends" on Jimmy Kimmel Live!. The song was also performed at 2011's Femme Fatale Tour. After a neon sign reading "Femme Fatale" was lifted from the stage, the show began with a video introduction in which Spears was arrested by the police after a chasing sequence. As she said "I'm not that innocent", a lyric from "Oops!... I Did It Again", the video screens parted and she appeared standing in front of a metallic structure in a silver costume to perform "Hold It Against Me". She was accompanied by her back-up dancers in white and silver costumes. Andrew Matson of The Seattle Times said that the performance "set the pace: hot and heavy."

== Cover versions ==
"Hold It Against Me" was covered by American recording artist Miguel for Billboard. English singer-songwriter Taio Cruz also covered the song, incorporating R&B elements on his version. Marines from the Rein 266 and HMLA 169 helicopter squadrons uploaded a video to YouTube of them lip synching to the song in their base in Afghanistan. Spears posted the video on her Twitter account and added, "I am in LOVE with this... I always knew our soldiers were fierce! Thanks for everything you guys do." American pop band Selena Gomez & the Scene performed a tribute to Spears during their 2011 We Own the Night Tour. They performed "Hold It Against Me" along with a medley of hits that included "...Baby One More Time", "(You Drive Me) Crazy", "Oops!... I Did It Again", "I'm a Slave 4 U" and "Toxic", mixed similar to the Chris Cox Megamix included in Greatest Hits: My Prerogative (2004). In the 2012 Glee episode "Britney 2.0", Heather Morris' character Brittany Pierce performed a cover of the track. The song is also sampled on the Krewella song "Feel Me", as well as the Sabrepulse song "Paradise".

== Track listings ==
- Digital download
1. "Hold It Against Me" – 3:49
- Digital download (EP)
1. "Hold It Against Me" – 3:49
2. "Hold It Against Me" (Jumpsmokers Club Remix) – 6:02
3. "Hold It Against Me" (Funk Generation Radio Remix) – 3:48
4. "Hold It Against Me" (Video) – 4:28
- CD single
1. "Hold It Against Me" (Main Version) – 3:49
2. "Hold It Against Me" (Instrumental) – 3:49
- Digital download (The Remixes)
1. "Hold It Against Me" (Adrian Lux & Nause Radio Edit) – 3:05
2. "Hold It Against Me" (Jumpsmokers Club Mix) – 6:02
3. "Hold It Against Me" (Ocelot Club Mix) – 6:14
4. "Hold It Against Me" (Smoke 'N Mirrors Club Mix) – 7:41
5. "Hold It Against Me" (Funk Generation Radio Edit) – 3:48
6. "Hold It Against Me" (Tracy Young Ferosh Anthem Mix; Full Club) – 8:38
7. "Hold It Against Me" (Abe Clements Radio Edit) – 4:02

== Credits and personnel ==
- Britney Spears – lead vocals
- Dr. Luke – producer, songwriter, instruments and programming
- Max Martin – producer, songwriter, instruments and programming
- Bonnie McKee – songwriter, background vocals and guest vocals
- Billboard – co-producer, songwriter, instruments and programming
- Myah Marie – background vocals
- Emily Wright – engineering
- Sam Holland – engineering
- Tim Roberts – engineering
- Vezna Gottwald – engineering
- John Hanes – engineering
- Serban Ghenea – audio mixing

Credits adapted from "Hold It Against Me"'s CD single liner notes.

== Charts ==
=== Weekly charts ===
Weekly chart performance for "Hold It Against Me"
| Chart (2011) | Peak position |
|---|---|
| Australia (ARIA) | 4 |
| Austria (Ö3 Austria Top 40) | 16 |
| Belgium (Ultratop 50 Flanders) | 2 |
| Belgium (Ultratop 50 Wallonia) | 1 |
| Brazil (Brasil Hot 100 Airplay) | 35 |
| Brazil (Brasil Hot Pop Songs) | 12 |
| Canada Hot 100 (Billboard) | 1 |
| Canada CHR/Top 40 (Billboard) | 2 |
| Canada Hot AC (Billboard) | 7 |
| CIS Airplay (TopHit) | 28 |
| Croatia International Airplay (Top lista) | 6 |
| Czech Republic Airplay (ČNS IFPI) | 17 |
| Denmark (Tracklisten) | 1 |
| Euro Digital Song Sales (Billboard) | 4 |
| Finland (Suomen virallinen lista) | 1 |
| France (SNEP) | 31 |
| Germany (GfK) | 23 |
| Global Dance Tracks (Billboard) | 6 |
| Greece Airplay (IFPI) | 2 |
| Greece Digital (Billboard) | 2 |
| Hungary (Rádiós Top 40) | 33 |
| Ireland (IRMA) | 5 |
| Italy (FIMI) | 2 |
| Luxembourg Digital Song Sales (Billboard) | 8 |
| Mexico Anglo Airplay (Monitor Latino) | 4 |
| Netherlands (Single Top 100) | 20 |
| Netherlands (Dutch Top 40) | 25 |
| New Zealand (Recorded Music NZ) | 1 |
| Norway (VG-lista) | 2 |
| Poland (Polish Airplay New) | 4 |
| Portugal Digital Song Sales (Billboard) | 7 |
| Russia Airplay (TopHit) | 26 |
| Scottish Singles Sales (Official Charts) | 4 |
| Slovakia Airplay (ČNS IFPI) | 3 |
| South Korea (Circle) | 44 |
| South Korea International (Circle) | 1 |
| Spain (Promusicae) | 6 |
| Switzerland (Schweizer Hitparade) | 7 |
| Sweden (Sverigetopplistan) | 9 |
| Ukraine Airplay (TopHit) | 115 |
| UK Singles (Official Charts) | 6 |
| US Billboard Hot 100 | 1 |
| US Adult Pop Airplay (Billboard) | 23 |
| US Dance Club Songs (Billboard) | 1 |
| US Dance Airplay (Billboard) | 1 |
| US Pop Airplay (Billboard) | 3 |
| US Rhythmic Airplay (Billboard) | 14 |

=== Year-end charts ===
Annual chart rankings for "Hold It Against Me"
| Chart (2011) | Position |
|---|---|
| Australia (ARIA) | 97 |
| Belgium (Ultratop 50 Flanders) | 93 |
| Belgium (Ultratop 50 Wallonia) | 81 |
| Brazil (Crowley Broadcast Analysis) | 18 |
| Canada (Canadian Hot 100) | 50 |
| CIS (TopHit) | 141 |
| Croatia (HRT) | 88 |
| Italy (Musica e dischi) | 78 |
| Japan (Japan Hot 100) | 75 |
| Lebanon (NRJ) | 61 |
| Russia Airplay (Tophit) | 180 |
| South Korea Foreign (Circle) | 16 |
| Sweden (Sverigetopplistan) | 96 |
| UK Singles (OCC) | 136 |
| US Billboard Hot 100 | 60 |
| US Dance Club Songs (Billboard) | 34 |
| US Dance/Mix Show Airplay (Billboard) | 30 |
| US Mainstream Top 40 (Billboard) | 40 |

== Certifications and sales ==
Certifications and sales for "Hold It Against Me"
| Region | Certification | Certified units/sales |
|---|---|---|
| Australia (ARIA) | Platinum | 70,000^{^} |
| Mexico (AMPROFON) | Gold | 30,000^{*} |
| New Zealand (RMNZ) | Gold | 7,500^{*} |
| South Korea (Gaon) | — | 672,356 |
| Sweden (GLF) | 2× Platinum | 80,000^{‡} |
| United Kingdom (BPI) | Silver | 200,000^{‡} |
| United States (RIAA) | 2× Platinum | 2,000,000^{‡} |
^{*} Sales figures based on certification alone.^{^} Shipments figures based on certification alone.^{‡} Sales+streaming figures based on certification alone.

== Release history ==
Release dates and formats for "Hold It Against Me"
| Region | Date | Format(s) | Label(s) | Ref. |
|---|---|---|---|---|
| Various | January 10, 2011 | Streaming | Jive | |
| Australia | January 11, 2011 | Digital download | Sony Music | |
| Canada | January 11, 2011 | Digital download | Sony Music | |
| Denmark | January 11, 2011 | Digital download | Sony Music | |
| Finland | January 11, 2011 | Digital download | Sony Music | |
| France | January 11, 2011 | Digital download | Sony Music | |
| Greece | January 11, 2011 | Digital download | Sony Music | |
| Italy | January 11, 2011 | Digital download | Sony Music | |
| Ireland | January 11, 2011 | Digital download | Sony Music | |
| Mexico | January 11, 2011 | Digital download | Sony Music | |
| Netherlands | January 11, 2011 | Digital download | Sony Music | |
| New Zealand | January 11, 2011 | Digital download | Sony Music | |
| Norway | January 11, 2011 | Digital download | Sony Music | |
| Portugal | January 11, 2011 | Digital download | Sony Music | |
| Spain | January 11, 2011 | Digital download | Sony Music | |
| Sweden | January 11, 2011 | Digital download | Sony Music | |
| Switzerland | January 11, 2011 | Digital download | Sony Music | |
| United States | January 11, 2011 | Digital download | Jive | |
| Brazil | January 12, 2011 | Digital download | Sony Music | |
| Poland | January 12, 2011 | Digital download | Sony Music | |
| United Kingdom | January 17, 2011 | Digital download | RCA | |
| United States | January 18, 2011 | Contemporary hit radio | Jive | |
| Germany | February 11, 2011 | Digital download | Sony Music | |
| Germany | February 18, 2011 | CD | Sony Music | |
| Hong Kong | March 25, 2011 | CD | Sony Music | |

== See also ==
- List of Billboard Dance Club Songs number ones of 2011
- List of most expensive music videos
