= Femme Fatale Tour =

2011 concert tour by Britney Spears

- World tour by Britney Spears
- Location: Asia; Europe; North America; South America
- Associated album: Femme Fatale
- Start date: June 16, 2011
- End date: December 10, 2011
- Legs: 3
- No. of shows: 79
- Supporting acts: Destinee & Paris; DJ Pauly D; Howie Dorough; Jessie and the Toy Boys; Joe Jonas; Nervo; Nicki Minaj; The Wanted
- Attendance: 697,957
- Box office: US$68.7 million (Note: US$98.32 million in 2025 dollars.)

Britney Spears concert chronology
- The Circus Starring Britney Spears (2009); Femme Fatale Tour (2011); Britney: Piece of Me (2013–17)

The Femme Fatale Tour was the eighth concert tour by American entertainer Britney Spears. It was launched in support of her seventh studio album, Femme Fatale (2011). It was officially announced in March 2011, initially with dates for North American venues revealed. The tour was originally planned as a co-headlining tour with Enrique Iglesias, but he cancelled only hours after the announcement. The show was inspired by the concept of the "femme fatale" and iconic femmes fatales throughout the ages. The setlist was mostly composed of songs from the album Femme Fatale, although Spears also performed hits from her previous albums for her fans. Zaldy Goco designed the costumes. In July 2011, Spears announced her plans of a South American leg on the tour, in territories she either had never been to or had not played for over a decade. Spears has named the Femme Fatale Tour as the "best" show of her career.

The tour, divided in five segments, portrays a story in which Spears is a secret agent, who is chased by a stalker named Tormento Lancie (played by Rudolf Martin). The first section features her escaping from prison, along with other female inmates. The second segment displays upbeat dance numbers, and ends with a performance inspired by Marilyn Monroe. The third section features an Egyptian theme, with fireworks and acrobatics. The fourth segment displays energetic routines and motorcycle costumes. The encore begins with a video interlude of Spears capturing the stalker, and is followed by two performances in which she defeats a group of ninjas.

The Femme Fatale Tour received mixed reviews from critics. Some described it as Spears' most entertaining show and praised the flashy production, while others criticized her low-effort dancing and lack of audience interaction. Nonetheless, the tour was the eleventh highest-grossing tour of 2011, with a gross of $68.7 million. 697,957 tickets were sold worldwide, with an average attendance of 8,724 (some venues were considerably larger), paying an average of $98.43. grossed $6.2 million in the first ten shows. It was also included on Pollstar’s Top 100 North American Tours list with the 39 dates in North America grossing $38.3 million and selling 423,017 tickets.

An unofficial, high-quality recording of the Las Vegas show was leaked onto YouTube in July 2011; it was removed after the Recording Industry Association of America (RIAA) threatened legal action against the site, in order to obtain information on the uploader. 3ality Digital filmed a special of the tour during the Toronto shows, in August 2011, in 2-D and 3-D. The special, titled Britney Spears Live: The Femme Fatale Tour, aired on Epix in the United States. BBC Worldwide acquired the rights to both the 2-D and 3-D versions outside the United States.

== Background ==
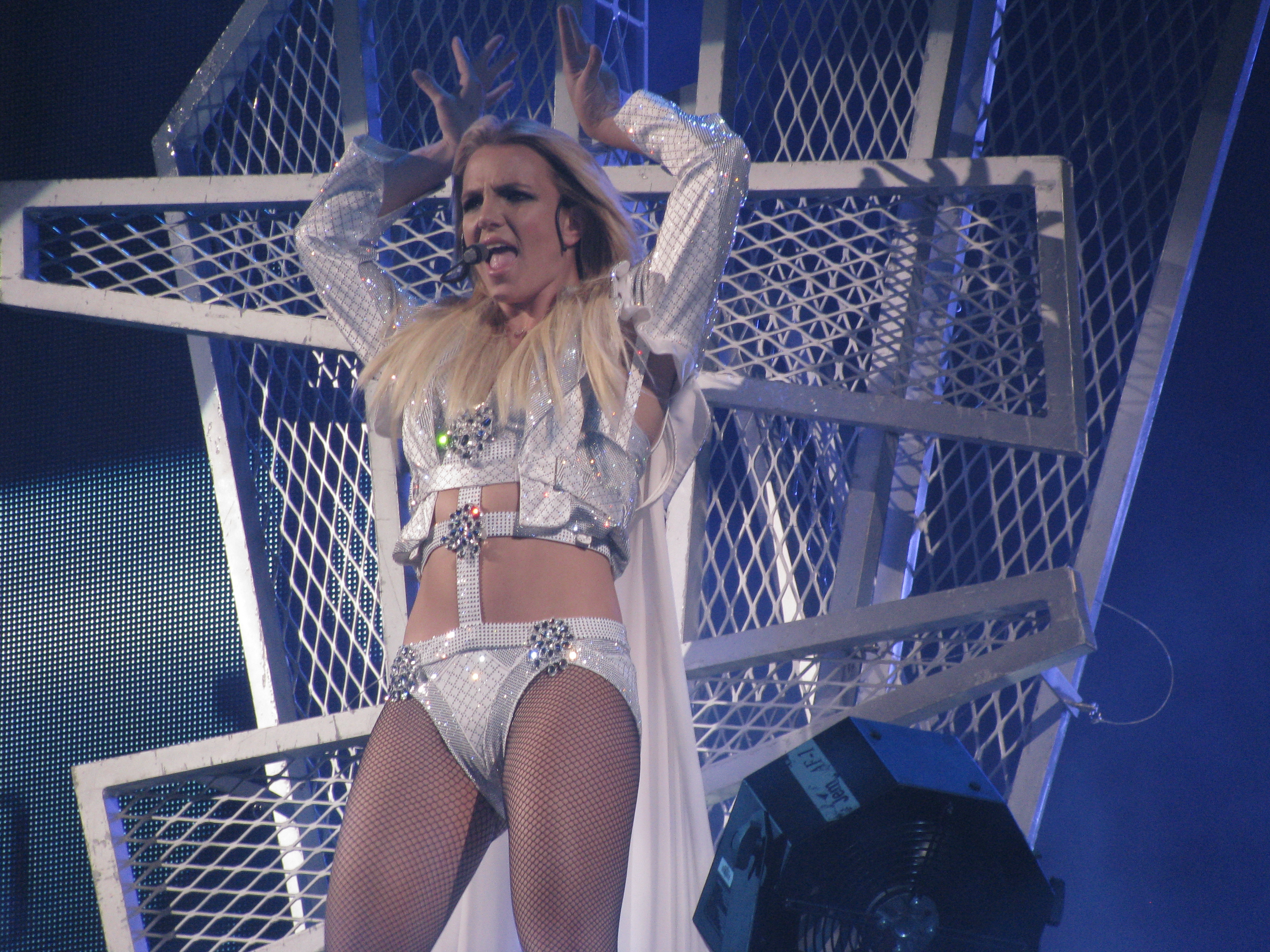
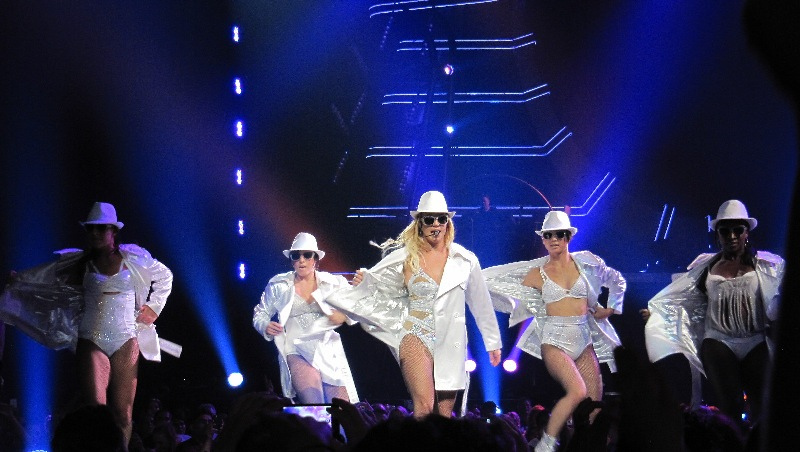
The show began with a performance of "Hold It Against Me" (top), which had Spears in a silver outfit, while "3" (bottom) featured her and her dancers wearing sunglasses, white trench coats and fedoras.

In an interview on Ryan Seacrest's radio show on March 4, 2011, Spears stated she would tour the United States in the "early summer" in support of Femme Fatale. On March 29, 2011, following her performances on Good Morning America, she announced a co-headlining tour with Enrique Iglesias, starting in June 2011. Hours after the announcement, it was reported by Billboard that Iglesias had pulled out of the tour. Ray Wedell of Billboard speculated that the reason may have been that Spears was deemed by news outlets as the headliner, while Iglesias was considered the opening act. The first twenty-six North American dates were also announced on March 29, 2011. The opening acts were announced on April 12, 2011. Spears stated, "This is the Femme Fatale tour and I'm thrilled to have Nicki Minaj, Jessie and the Toy Boys, and Nervo join me and get everyone on the dance floor. Can't wait to take the Femme Fatales on the road." Tickets for select markets went on sale on April 30, 2011 via Ticketmaster and tour promoter Live Nation's websites.

In May 2011, it was announced that Spears would headline Summerfest on July 9, 2011, at the Marcus Amphitheater in Milwaukee, Wisconsin. She previously headlined the festival on July 8, 2000, during her Oops!... I Did It Again Tour, and had to cancel her performance during The Onyx Hotel Tour in 2004 due to a knee injury. Summerfest entertainment director Bob Babisch said, "It's going to be a great dance party. [...] This is going to be the biggest production we've ever put in the Marcus Amphitheatre. There's a thrust that goes out on the stage about 80 feet, and it's about 80 feet wide, and there's all kinds of things flying in and out." The European tour dates were announced on her official website on June 5, 2011. On July 25, 2011, Spears announced through her Ustream page at 18:00 EST (23:00 UTC) a South American leg of the tour. Accompanied by two of her dancers — one translating in Spanish and the other in Portuguese — she also apologized for not touring in the region during The Circus Starring Britney Spears in 2009. A notice following the stream announced the first two dates in Brazil and ten more dates to be announced in the near future. This would mark Spears' first concert in Brazil in ten years, since her 2001 performance at Rock in Rio. During the following days, concerts in countries such as Argentina, Chile, Colombia and Perú were also announced. On September 26, 2011, it was announced that Spears would perform on the first day of the Abu Dhabi Grand Prix.

== Development ==
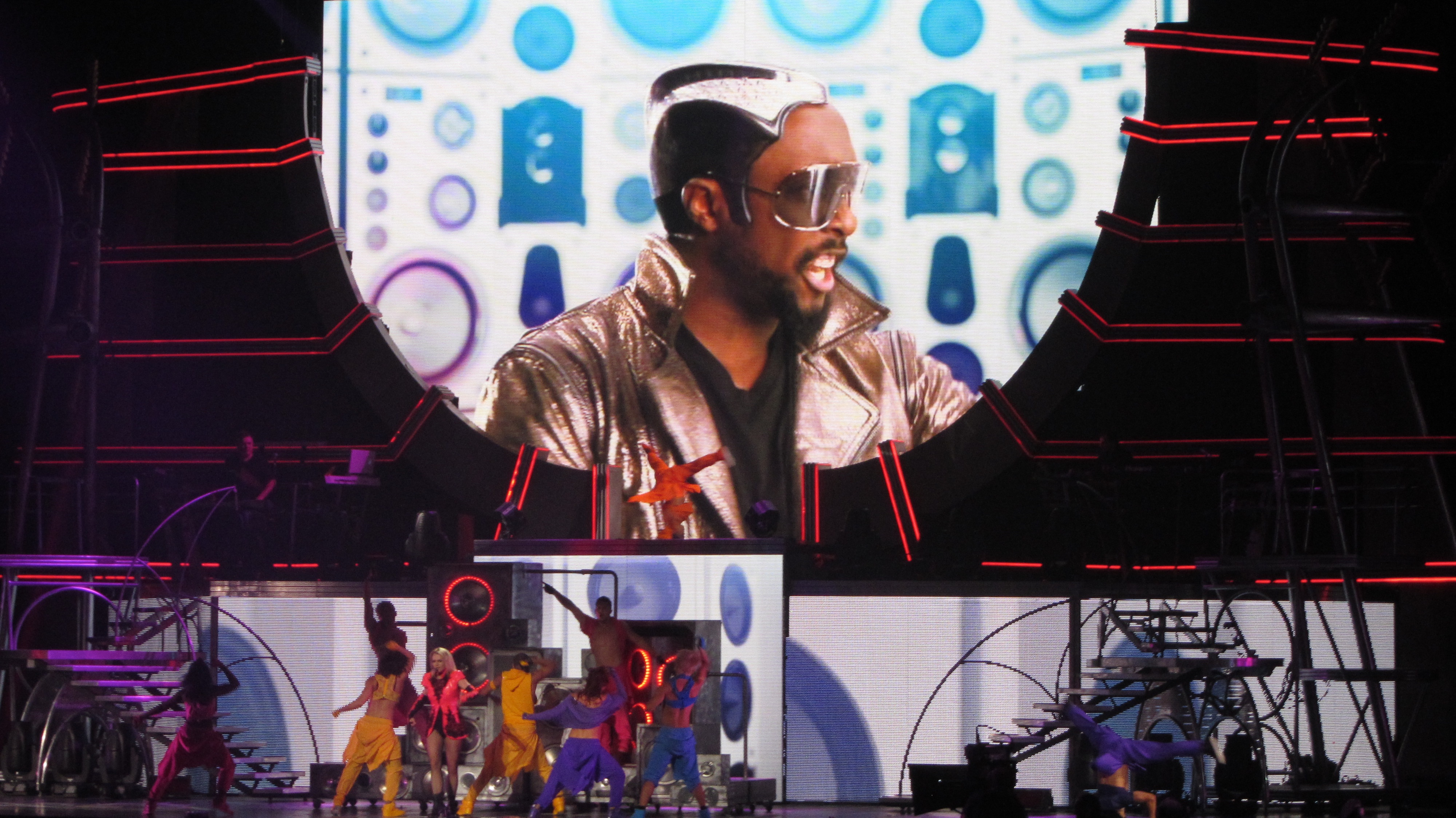
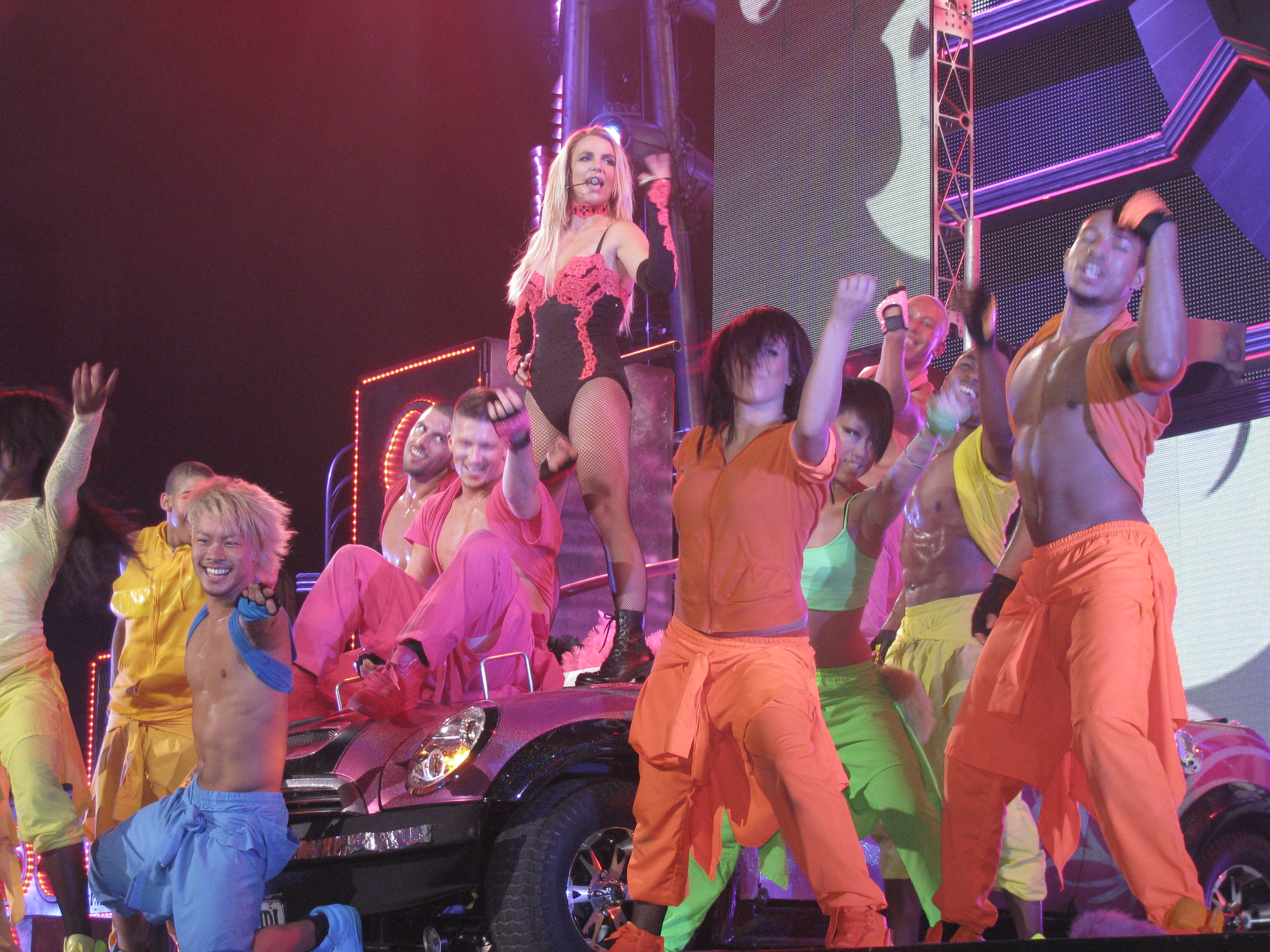
The performance of "Big Fat Bass" (left), featured will.i.am in the backdrops, while "How I Roll" (right) was performed atop a pink car.

In March 2011, Spears's manager Larry Rudolph told MTV News that the tour would have a "post-apocalyptic vibe", and commented that "Till the World Ends" "keeps becoming a theme for us." He also confirmed Jamie King as the tour director and Brian Friedman as the choreographer. The following month, Friedman announced that he had pulled out of the tour due to scheduling conflicts with his own reality series. In a video interview posted on Spears's official website, she said, "The Femme Fatale Tour will hopefully just be outrageously spectacular. I'm just hoping that the choreographers will come up with just the most outrageous things, and I'm really excited. This is the most excited I've been about a project in a really long time, so I can't wait." The script of the show was created by Jamie King, and was inspired by the concept of the femme fatale and femme fatales throughout the ages. Rudolph stated that the idea for the show was to have Spears as an "international woman of mystery". The setlist was composed mostly of songs from Femme Fatale, but also included her most popular hits from her earlier albums; as Spears explained, "The fans really like a lot of the old songs, because that's what they are used to. So it's just about finding the balance, and how many songs I wanna incorporate from the past and from the present."

The costume design was done by Zaldy Goco, and the outfits were created to fit the different personas of Spears throughout the show. He also commented that the inspiration for the costumes was "Britney herself [...] She's a very sexy girl." Among the outfits that Goco previewed to Extra, prior to the beginning of the tour, were a pink latex jacket, a nude bodysuit, a Marilyn Monroe-inspired, white flowing dress, several gladiator-inspired, gold-mirrored outfits, pink-chrome-studded leather and denim, as well as a "Toxic"-inspired catsuit. For the finale, she was revealed to wear a kimono, with an anime version of herself silk-screened on one sleeve, over a sparkling, black bodysuit with LED lights built-into it. On April 30, 2011, a video of Spears rehearsing "How I Roll" from Femme Fatale with her dancers surfaced online. On May 11, 2011, Sabi spoke to MTV News at a St. Bernard Project dinner, hosted by Spears, stating that she would join her during the performances of "(Drop Dead) Beautiful" at select dates, such as Los Angeles, Las Vegas and New York City. On June 7, 2011, a video surfaced online of Spears seeing the stage for the first time, along with a soundcheck of the audio, and staging for "Hold It Against Me". According to Jocelyn Vena of MTV, the stage "has it all: lights, video screens, a funky neon-colored floor, lasers, lifts and giant butterfly wings." In an interview with Entertainment Tonight on June 8, 2011, Spears said about the show,

"I'm really excited. I'm probably going to be extra nervous the day before. We've been working hard for, like, two months now, and everything's coming together really good. [...] [The show] can be kind of [grueling], especially when you're onstage and you're on your eighth number, you get really winded and you're like, 'How can I do the rest of the show?' But I've been training for a while and I actually — before I come to rehearsals — I've been working out and stuff like that so I won't have that predicament."

"She's a great artist in every way and I'm really happy for her. I think she has a distinct sound when she raps. It really stands out and sets her apart from everyone else. I'm happy she's able to be on tour with me because that's just amazing."

— Spears talking about Nicki Minaj.

After Minaj was announced as the opening act in April 2011, she said on Ryan Seacrest's radio show she was looking forward to creating "a new, a bigger, a brighter, a more spectacular show." She stated that as much as her set was about the music, she wanted to put more theater on stage, saying, "my goal [is] to truly put on a show and incorporate theater and dance." The hair and make-up was done by Marco Berardini, who was inspired by European women such as Brigitte Bardot. "It's the epitome of a strong woman. I wanted to bring out that strength and sexiness for all the girls on tour", he said. He applied Spears with makeup and designed it to "be a little bit neutral so that it could work with anything." As for the hair, it was changed at every show to fit the vibe of the city. For example, at the Uniondale show on August 2, 2011, Spears sported wavy hair, inspired by Sarah Jessica Parker and the street style of New York women.

BuzzFeed reported that 23 18-wheeler trucks arrived at each venue at 5 a.m. on show day. It took 7 hours to unload and build the stage. Unlike most tours who built the stage from the bottom up, the stage was built from the ceiling down. The tour comprised 140 workers, 125 crew members, 14 tour buses, 16 dancers and 2 band members. In July 2011, Spears told MTV News she was having "a blast" on the tour, commenting, "The shows have been equally amazing. The crowds have been so good each night and that gives you the adrenaline you need to get through the show. It just pumps you up." She also talked about the performance of "Till the World Ends", saying that "at the end of the show, the last song [Minaj] comes on every once in awhile [sic]. Not every show, but it's usually special when she does it." In an interview with Glamour in October 2011, Spears said: "I seriously think it's the best tour I've done so far. [...] right now I’m really excited about the show – this is the funnest show I've done in my career."

== Concert synopsis ==
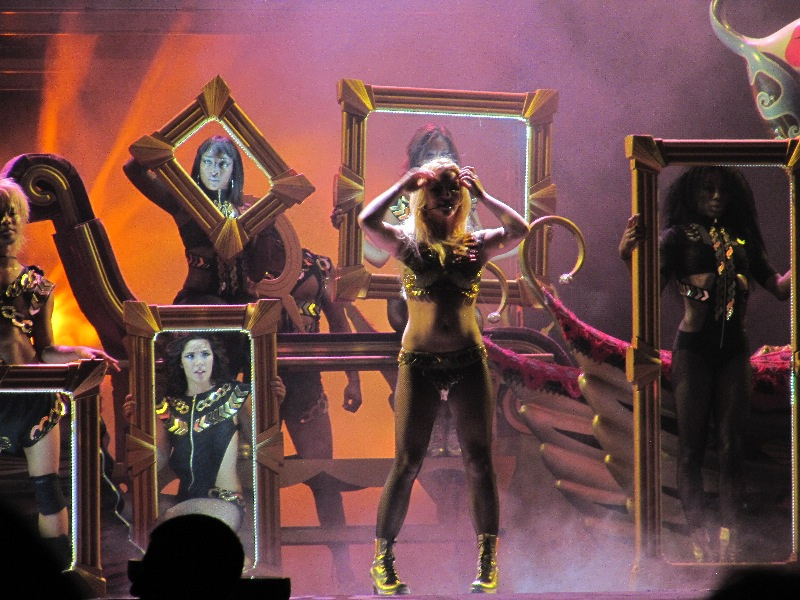
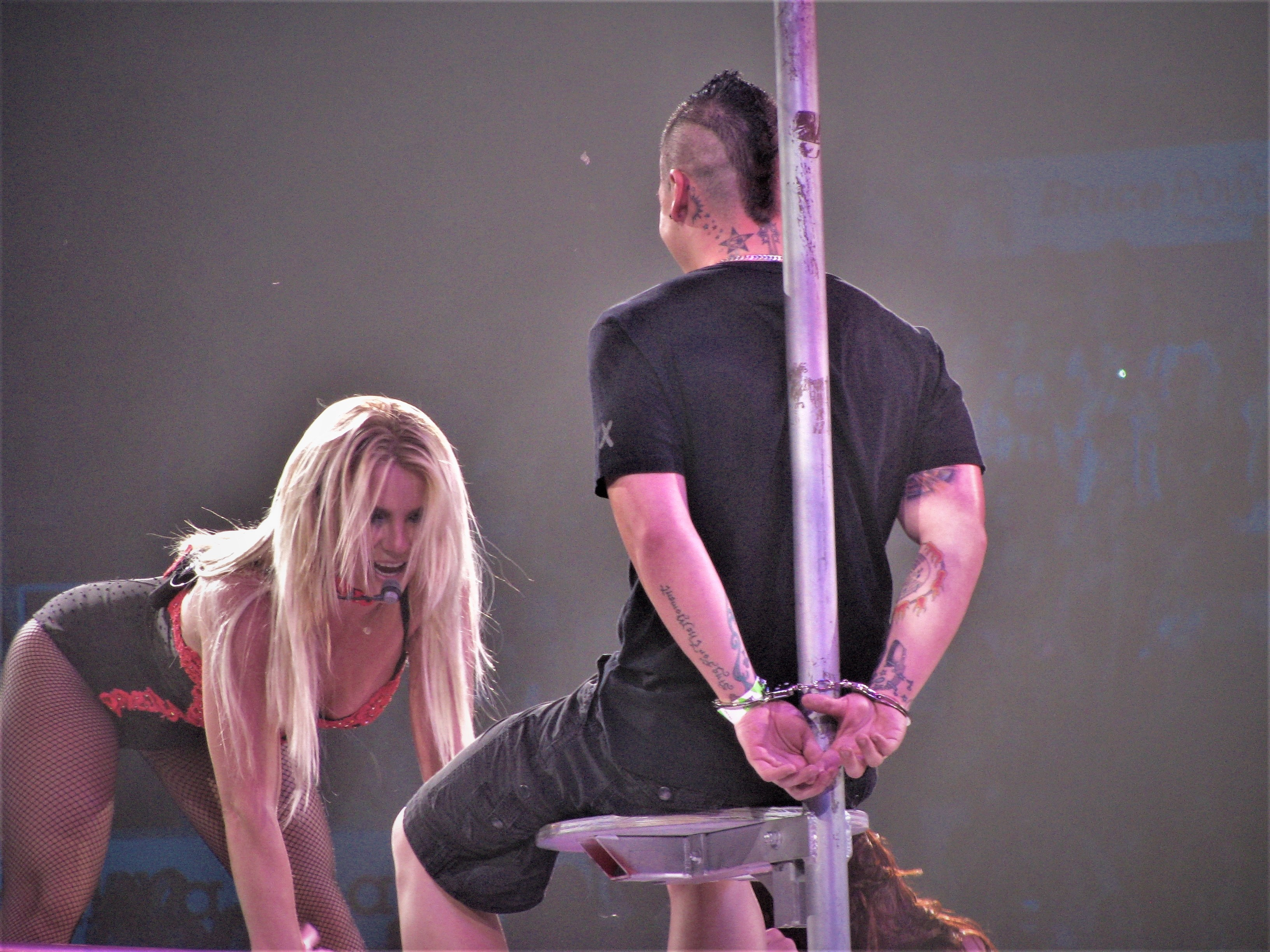
During the performance of "(Drop Dead) Beautiful" (left), the dancers carried giant picture frames, while during "Lace and Leather" (right) Spears interacted with an audience member onstage.

After a neon sign reading "Femme Fatale" is lifted from the stage, the show begins with a video introduction in which Spears is arrested by the police after a chasing sequence. As she says "I'm not that innocent", the video screens part and she appears standing on a metallic throne in a silver costume to perform "Hold It Against Me". She is accompanied by her back-up dancers in white and silver costumes. "Up n' Down" features Spears and her female dancers performing inside cages, with male dancers pursuing them dressed as policemen. After walking to the B-stage in a conveyor belt, Spears puts on a white trench coat and a satin fedora to perform "3". She then goes into "Piece of Me" while floating above the stage on a platform.

This is followed by a video intermission that contains the beginning of the music video for "My Prerogative", and in which a stalker reveals that Spears is a secret agent. The next section begins with Spears in a pink latex and lace jacket emerging from inside a speaker to perform "Big Fat Bass", while will.i.am appears in the backdrops. She removes the jacket to reveal a nude leotard for the performance of "How I Roll", which features a pink convertible Mini Cooper-like car and her dancers wearing colorful outfits. This is followed by a segment in which Spears and her dancers select a male member from the audience. She then bursts into "Lace and Leather" and performs sensually for him. After a costume change, Spears goes into the song "If U Seek Amy" while wearing a white skirt over a fan, recalling Marilyn Monroe's iconic scene in The Seven Year Itch (1955).

A video interlude in which the stalker talks about femme fatales throughout history introduces the third section of the show. Spears returns to the stage wearing a golden outfit and performs an Egyptian-inspired version of "Gimme More", which includes the use of pyrotechnics. In her next number "(Drop Dead) Beautiful" Spears is surrounded by her dancers carrying picture frames, and includes an appearance by Sabi in select cities. She then sings "He About to Lose Me" on a purple couch while her male dancers climb metallic structures. She wears a golden cape for a snake charming number of "Boys" (The Co-Ed Remix). After climbing into a swing, she starts singing "Don't Let Me Be the Last to Know", while an acrobat hangs from it.

Another video interlude follows, featuring Spears changing clothes and choosing between different passports inside a hotel room. The show’s final segment features Spears and her dancers dressed in motorcycle gear to perform a medley of "...Baby One More Time" and "S&M", while her next number "Trouble for Me" features Spears and her dancers performing in the B-stage. Accompanied by her female dancers, Spears performs "I'm a Slave 4 U" with gay soft porn in the backdrops, and subsequently a cover of Madonna's "Burning Up" sitting atop a giant silver guitar. She then brings several fans onstage for a performance of "I Wanna Go". She performs "Womanizer" with her dancers dressed as policemen and thanks the audience. The encore starts with a video interlude of "Scary". The video ends with Spears finally capturing the stalker while wearing a kimono. She reappears to perform a martial arts-inspired version of "Toxic", in which she defeats a group of ninjas. At the end of the song, she goes below the stage and returns wearing a black sparkly bodysuit for "Till the World Ends". Halfway through the performance, Nicki Minaj appears on the backdrops rapping her verse of The Femme Fatale Remix of the song. She also joined Spears to perform the verse in select cities. After the song changes back to the original version, Spears starts flying on a platform with giant angel wings. The show ends with Spears and her dancers thanking the audience, as confetti falls and the "Femme Fatale" sign is lowered onstage.

== Critical response ==
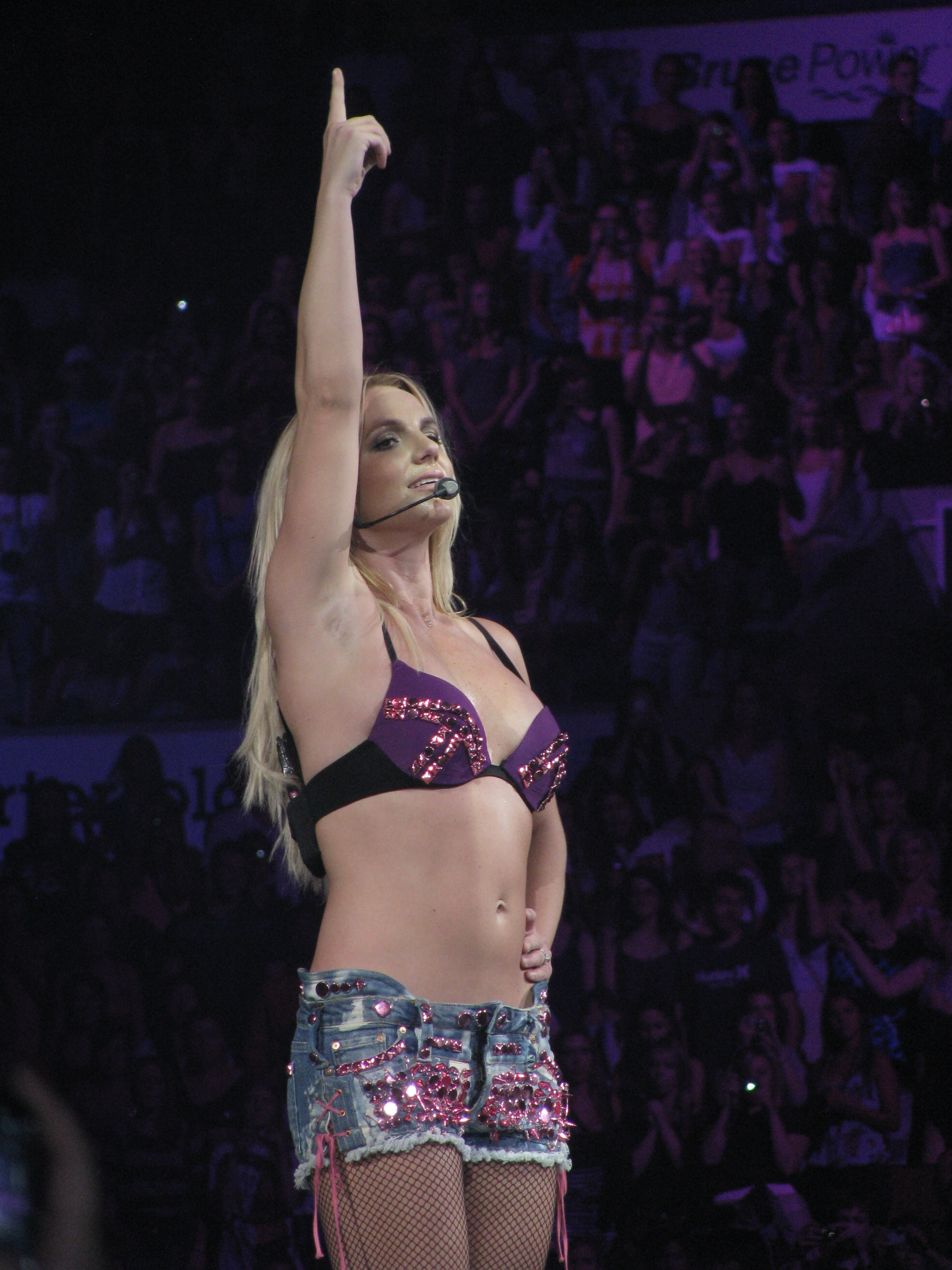
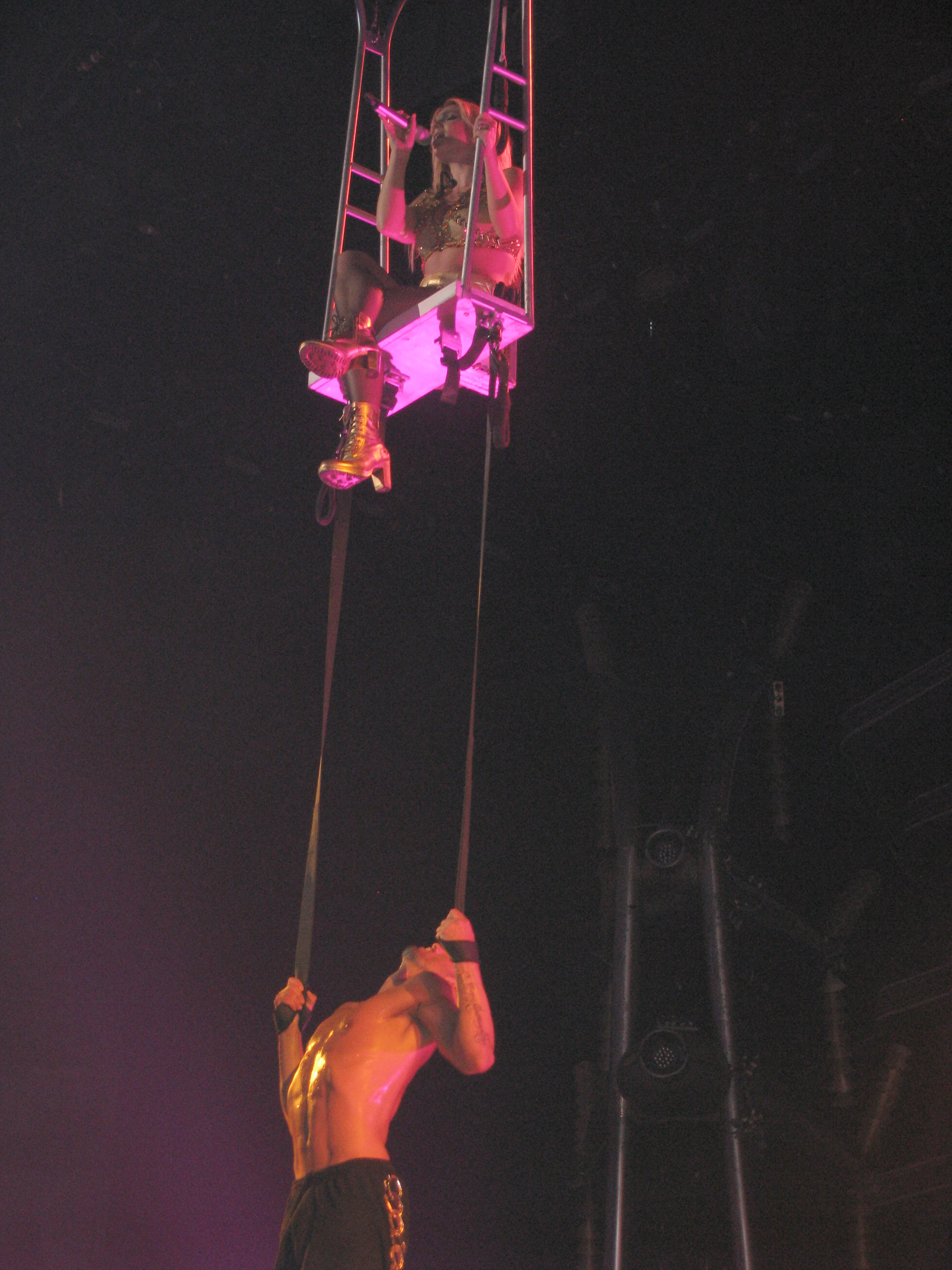
During the performance of "Womanizer" (left), Spears wore a purple bra and denim shorts, while in "Don't Let Me Be the Last to Know" (right) she performed on a swing.

Barry Walters from Rolling Stone called the show "possibly her flashiest, fastest moving, and most entertaining production yet", and added that the night belonged to Spears, as "she managed to prove that she's still progressing as a showgirl. Not only that, she's doing it better than even diehard defenders would've predicted. At 29, the pop star whose career seemed in danger of ending just a couple years ago has shown that she's back – hopefully this time to stay." Evelyn McDonnell of Spin said that "the idol America loves to hate went all out. Her body perpetually moved, she sang steadfastly into her headset (okay, she's got plenty of digital support, but she doesn't merely lip-sync), and she shimmied through an endless parade of outfits. [...] Having been knocked down by the tabloid press and the public repeatedly in recent years, Spears is now desperately seeking our attention. And she earns it. Haters go home." Kelley L. Carter of MTV commented that "the Spears that captivated the audience at the Staples Center [...] was the old, fun-loving, free-wheeling Spears — with a sexy, showgirl twist. There wasn't much pretense, though those glamazon outfits blinded in the best way possible. Instead, there was just good dance music." Carla Meyer of The Sacramento Bee stated that "Though Spears performed like a pro throughout the show, hitting all her marks, she had shown hesitancy in her movements — natural for the first stop on a tour. But that hesitancy vanished when she put on the denim. She seemed at ease."

Shaunna Murphy of Entertainment Weekly criticized "Britney's complete lack of verbal audience interaction [...] and her obviously diminished dancing ability" but also added that "with her slim waist, her dangerously toned legs, and most importantly her engaged, wide-eyed smile, [Spears] looked happy to be there with us—the crucial element that has been missing from so many Britney shows of late." August Brown of the Los Angeles Times stated that "the Femme Fatale tour gets its drama by largely erasing — or at least tweaking — the past. [...] Spears manipulates pop's virgin–whore complex better than just about anyone, and her seamless sweep from lasciviously grinding on an awestruck dude from the audience to the earnest balladry of 'Don’t Let Me Be the Last to Know' [...] felt true to the sweep of her career — she learned that she can control the narrative by vanishing into a club's heat or into literal thin air." Matt Kivel of Variety commented, "Though visually impressive, the show lacked a truly engaging human quality. Spears moved with an almost mechanical detachment, lightly shifting through dance routines without fully letting her body release itself. With her voice heavily processed and laden with backing tracks, she appeared onstage as some strange blend of Michael Jackson, Madonna and Kraftwerk's Ralf and Florian." However, Jam! Canoe considered the show was "best described as Janet Jackson-like."

Steve Palopoli of Metro Silicon Valley said, "Musically, the show is heavy on the hits, although considering Britney as a musical phenomenon is like asking which of Madonna's albums is best. She's a cultural phenomenon, obviously, and the only edicts that seem to have been handed down in regards to the music is 'no lip-synching' (she definitely doesn't) and 'bigger and louder whenever possible.'" Shirley Halperin of The Hollywood Reporter stated it was "entertaining", but Spears "doesn’t quite have that spring in her dance step anymore and who requires a constant barrage of visual distractions while she mostly lip-synchs along to her hits". Jim Harrington of the Oakland Tribune deemed the show as "a mess pretty much from start to finish. The theatrics are awkward and confusing, the dance routines are numbingly bland and old-hat, the song selection is weak and misguided, and Britney's star power, so blinding on tours past, is remarkably dim." Alexis Petridis of The Guardian gave the show two stars out of five, saying that "there's a suspicion that the kind of person who goes to see Britney Spears live isn't really there for the music or her sparkling personality: tonight she seems as dead-eyed and distant as ever. What they're interested in is proximity to a global celebrity." Neil McCormick of The Daily Telegraph gave the show one star out of five, and called it "the saddest, laziest, dullest and most tawdry pop concert I have ever witnessed." He added that "the most amazing thing about the whole second-rate spectacle was that thousands of people, having forked out around £50 a head for tickets, practically raised the roof, cheering every dismal dance move, roaring for lip-synched vocals and lustily applauding limp erotica."

== Commercial reception ==
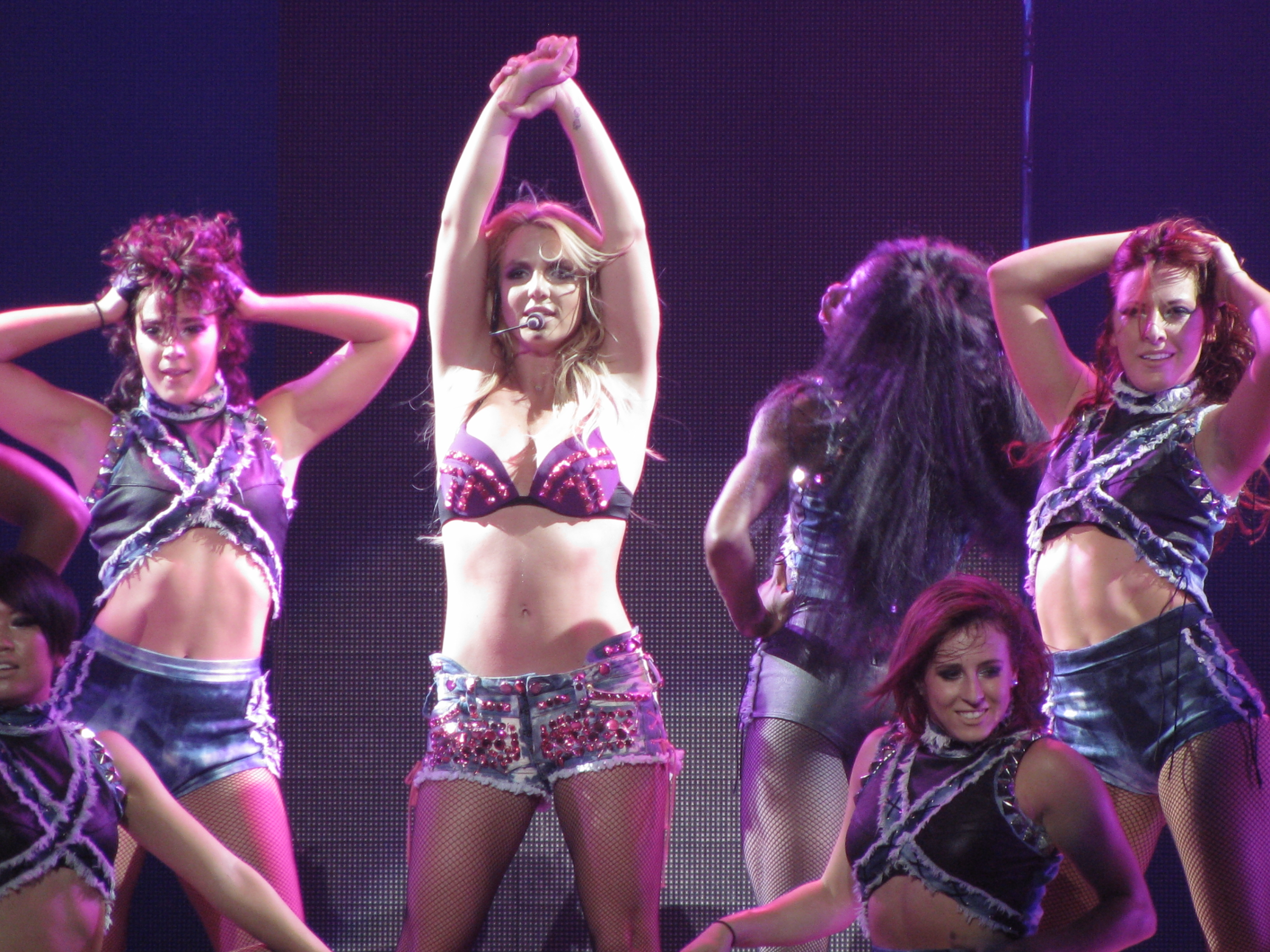
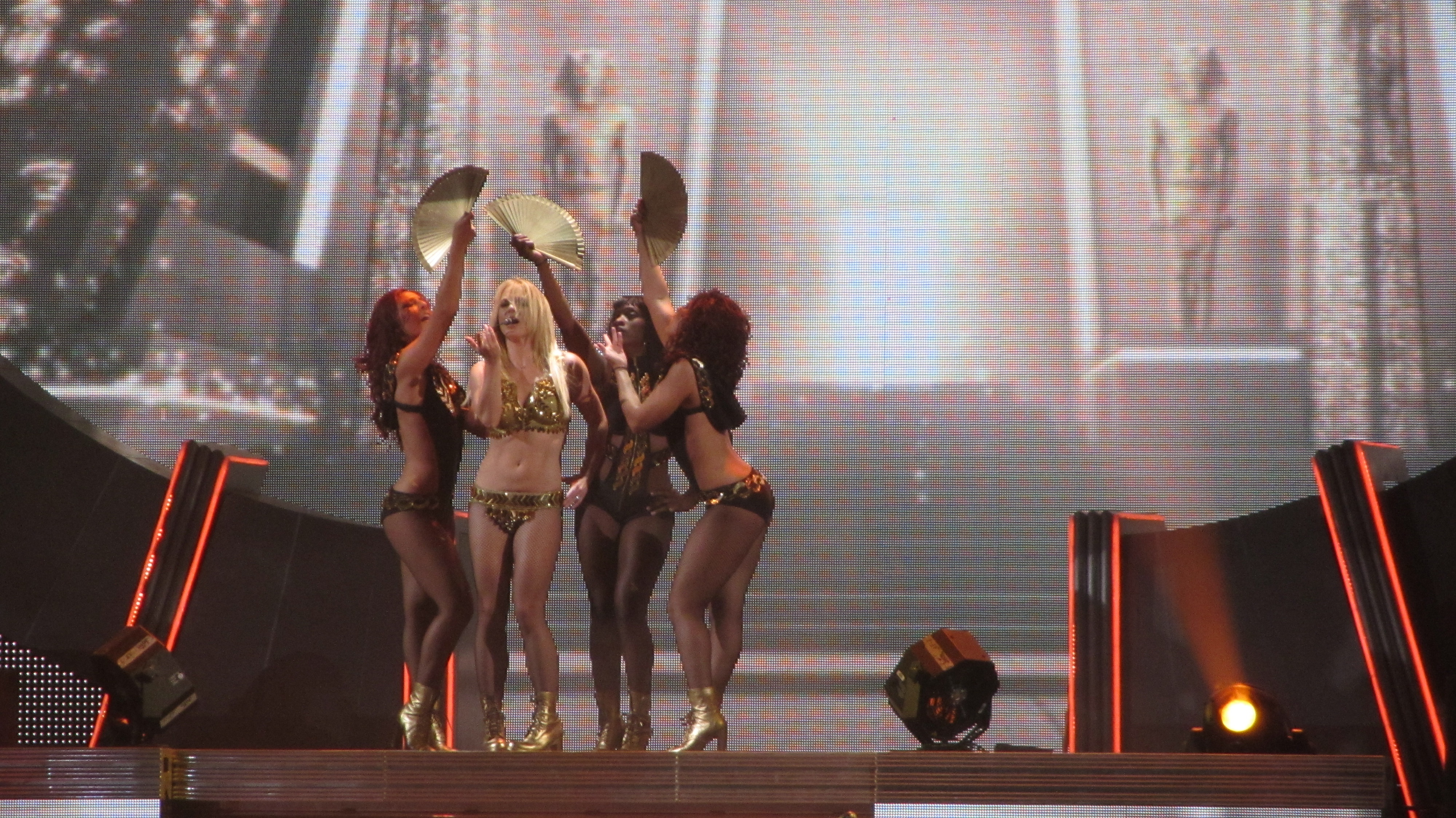
Spears was accompanied by her female dancers for "I'm a Slave 4 U" (left), while during "Gimme More" (right) she performed in a golden outfit.

Live Nation announced in early May 2011 a partnership with deal-of-the-day website Groupon. A spokesperson explained, "Offering a deal on Groupon is not a reflection of the quality or status or sales of a show" but rather "segmented marketing and a way to reach new and additional consumers." A staff editor for VH1 noted that as of June 16, 2011, 18,000 tickets were sold at discounted prices through Groupon for fifteen of the first twenty-four dates of the tour, including 1,800 at opening night in Sacramento. The Groupon deals for shows in Seattle, Winnipeg, Saint Paul, and Atlanta actually expired before all available discounted tickets were sold. The editor also stated that "the shows look to be under-attended in smaller cities, even as, in metropolitan areas like Greater New York City, new shows have been added. It remains to be seen whether this could have been remedied by better price optimization, or whether the tour's ambition was more outsized than its actual draw." The Femme Fatale Tour was ranked at number fifty-five by Pollstar on the Top 100 North American Tours list, grossing $6.2 million in the first ten shows. On July 22, 2011, the shows in Atlanta and Nashville ranked Spears at number ten on Billboard's Hot Tours list, with a combined gross of $1,563,934. On September 22, 2011, the tour was ranked at number six on the Top 20 Concert Tours list from Pollstar. It had an average gross of $940,165 per city, and an average ticket price of $84.19 during the shows in North America.

Groupon and Travelzoo offered discounted tickets for the shows in London, Manchester and Birmingham. Rene Freling from Travelzoo explained that "promoters are thinking, instead of shows being 90% sold out, they'd rather have it full and promote it to a wider audience." 238 tickets were sold through Groupon within minutes of the offer, and 5,000 tickets were sold for the UK shows by the time the offer expired. The move divided opinions in the music industry of the United Kingdom: festival organizer Melvin Benn said that discounted tickets work "particularly well for an awful lot of concerts. It's definitely emerging. In tough economic times people will look at varying ways of pricing their tickets." Independent promoter John Rostrum called it "very short-term" and "incredibly damaging for shows because in the future when a show goes on sale people will sit back and go, 'I won't buy until the week before'". The October 30, 2011 concert in Birmingham was her first in the English Midlands since The Onyx Hotel Tour in 2004. A week before the show, the venue's box office told the Leicester Mercury that the concert was "probably about half-full. There's good availability". It was revealed by Spears through her Twitter account that 80,000 people attended her free concert in the Plaza de la República, Mexico, on December 4, 2011.

In December 2011, the Femme Fatale Tour was number 19 on Billboard's Top 25 Tours of 2011. The magazine counted for 39 of the tour's dates (14 of which were sold out) with an overall gross of $37.1 million and 396,000 tickets sold. According to Pollstar, in North America, the tour was the fourteenth highest-grossing tour of 2011, with $38.3 million in ticket sales and 423,017 people attending at an average of 9,196 per show. Worldwide, the Femme Fatale Tour was the eleventh highest-grossing tour of 2011, with a gross of $68.7 million. 697,957 fans attended the shows worldwide, with an average attendance of 8,724, paying an average of $98.43.

== Broadcast and recordings ==
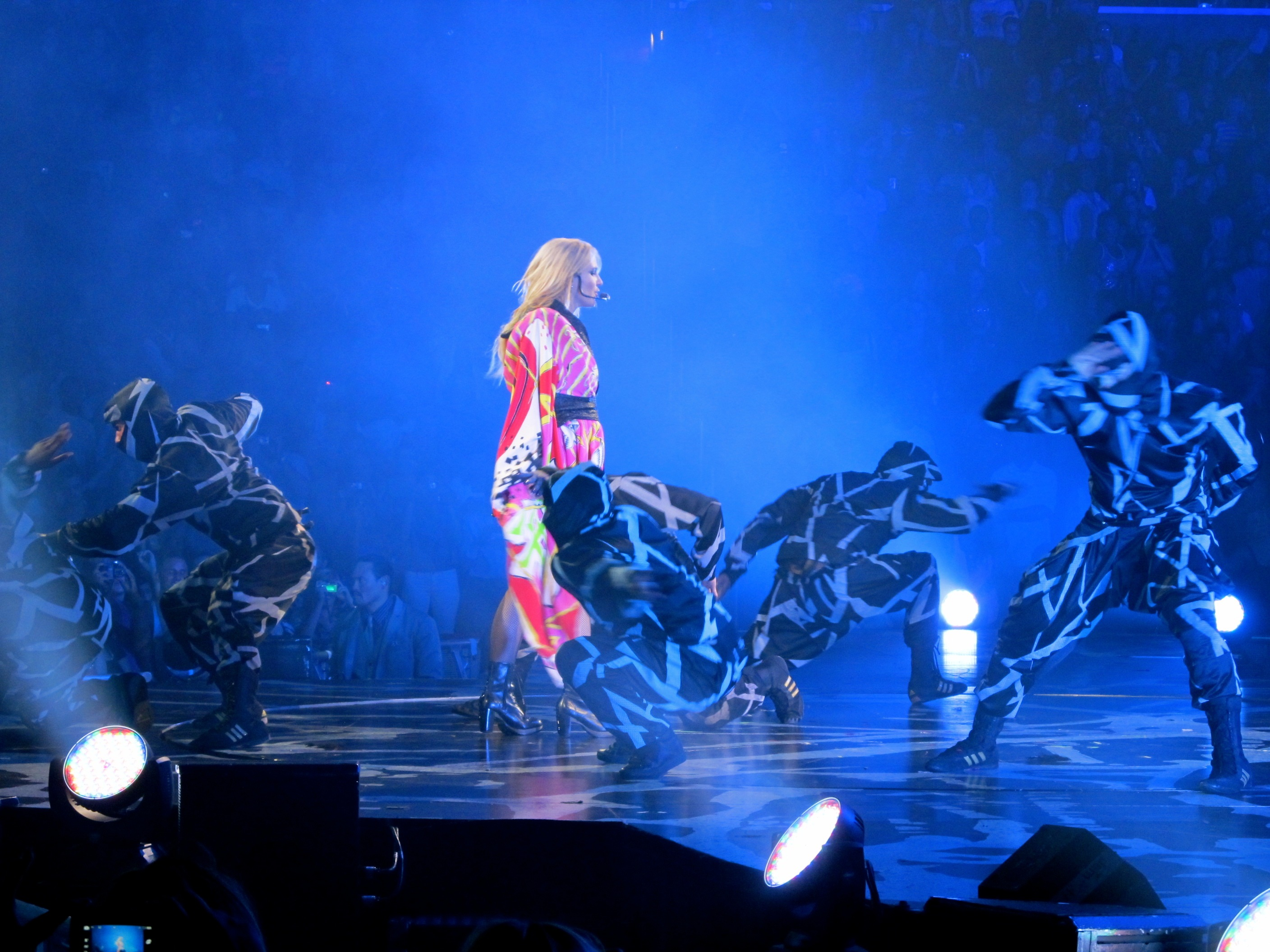
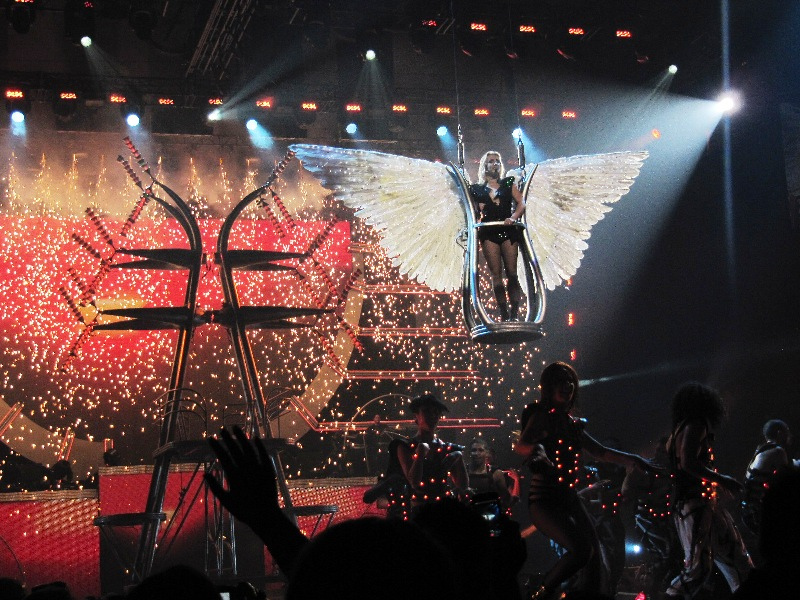
Spears wore a kimono during the performance of "Toxic" (left), while during "Till the World Ends" (right) she flew over the stage on a platform with wings.

In July 2011, a camera recording of the Las Vegas show was uploaded to YouTube. On July 14, 2011, the vice president of Online Anti-Piracy from the Recording Industry Association of America (RIAA), Marc McDevitt, requested a subpoena at a federal court to obtain personal details from YouTube of the user who uploaded the video, including the IP address, e-mail address and any other relevant information to identify the person. Although it is common for major music labels to send takedown requests to YouTube, it is thought to be the first time the RIAA filed legal action against the video hosting site in order to obtain the personal details of an uploader. The case was closed after a week; according to a copyright lawyer, it is most likely that the court granted the subpoena and that YouTube agreed to hand over the personal details that were requested. The video was removed from YouTube, but copies of the full concert can still be found on the site.

On August 12, 2011, Spears announced through her Twitter account that the Toronto shows at the Air Canada Centre would be taped to air on the Epix television channel, and for release on DVD. Within minutes of her announcement, traffic to EPIX social sites doubled and Britney Spears became a worldwide trending topic on Twitter. The show, initially titled Britney Spears: Femme Fatale, was shot in 2D and 3D by 3ality Digital. On September 9, 2011, it was announced by the BBC that BBC Worldwide had attained distribution rights of the show outside the United States. The 2D version will be available for broadcast from Christmas Eve 2011, with the 3D version available in February 2012. The special premiered on November 12, 2011 at 20:00 EST (01:00 UTC). It received mixed reviews from critics: some praised the special and the impressive stage, while others criticized Spears' dancing. The DVD and Blu-ray were released in the United States on November 21, 2011. The DVD was released in the United Kingdom on November 28, 2011. During the concert in Lima, Peru, the song "I Wanna Go" was professionally filmed by Coca-Cola as part of the competition "Dance with Britney Spears."

== Opening acts ==
- Nicki Minaj (North America) (select dates)
- Jessie and the Toy Boys (North America) (select dates)
- Nervo (North America) (select dates)
- DJ Pauly D (North America) (select dates)
- Joe Jonas (Europe) (select dates)
- Destinee & Paris (North America, Europe) (select dates)
- The Wanted (Manchester)
- Howie Dorough (South America) (select dates)
- Teen Angels (La Plata)
- Serebro (Moscow)

== Set list ==
The following set list is representative of the show on June 22, 2011. It is not representative of all concerts for the duration of the tour.

1. "Hold It Against Me"
2. "Up n' Down"
3. "3"
4. "Piece of Me"
5. "Big Fat Bass"
6. "How I Roll"
7. "Lace and Leather"
8. "If U Seek Amy"
9. "Gimme More"
10. "(Drop Dead) Beautiful"
11. "He About to Lose Me"
12. "Boys"
13. "Don't Let Me Be the Last to Know"
14. "...Baby One More Time" / "S&M"
15. "Trouble for Me"
16. "I'm a Slave 4 U"
17. "Burning Up"
18. "I Wanna Go"
19. "Womanizer"

Encore

20. "Toxic"
21. "Till the World Ends"

Notes

- "He About to Lose Me" and "Burning Up" were performed at selected shows.

== Shows ==
List of concerts, showing date, city, and venue
Date (2011)	City	Country	Venue
June 16	Sacramento	United States	Power Balance Pavilion
June 18	San Jose	United States	HP Pavilion
June 20	Los Angeles	United States	Staples Center
June 22	Glendale	United States	Jobing.com Arena
June 24	Anaheim	United States	Honda Center
June 25	Las Vegas	United States	MGM Grand Garden Arena
June 28	Portland	United States	Rose Garden
June 29	Tacoma	United States	Tacoma Dome
July 1	Vancouver	Canada	Rogers Arena
July 4	Winnipeg	Canada	MTS Centre
July 6	Saint Paul	United States	Xcel Energy Center
July 8	Chicago	United States	United Center
July 9 (Note: The July 9, 2011 concert at the Marcus Amphitheater in Milwaukee was part of Summerfest.)	Milwaukee	United States	Marcus Amphitheater
July 12	Dallas	United States	American Airlines Center
July 13	Houston	United States	Toyota Center
July 15	New Orleans	United States	New Orleans Arena
July 17	Atlanta	United States	Philips Arena
July 18	Nashville	United States	Bridgestone Arena
July 20	Orlando	United States	Amway Center
July 22	Miami	United States	American Airlines Arena
July 23	Jacksonville	United States	Veterans Memorial Arena
July 26	Cleveland	United States	Quicken Loans Arena
July 28	Auburn Hills	United States	The Palace of Auburn Hills
July 30	Philadelphia	United States	Wells Fargo Center
July 31	Washington, D.C.	United States	Verizon Center
August 2	Uniondale	United States	Nassau Coliseum
August 5	East Rutherford	United States	Izod Center
August 6	Atlantic City	United States	Boardwalk Hall
August 8	Boston	United States	TD Garden
August 9	Hartford	United States	XL Center
August 11	Montreal	Canada	Bell Centre
August 13	Toronto	Canada	Air Canada Centre
August 14	Toronto	Canada	Air Canada Centre
August 17	Grand Rapids	United States	Van Andel Arena
August 19	Pittsburgh	United States	Consol Energy Center
August 20	Columbus	United States	Nationwide Arena
August 22	Indianapolis	United States	Conseco Fieldhouse
August 24	Raleigh	United States	RBC Center
August 25	Charlotte	United States	Time Warner Cable Arena
September 22	St. Petersburg	Russia	Ice Palace
September 24	Moscow	Russia	Olympiyskiy
September 27	Kyiv	Ukraine	Palace of Sports
September 30	Budapest	Hungary	Budapest Sports Arena
October 1	Zagreb	Croatia	Arena Zagreb
October 3	Zürich	Switzerland	Hallenstadion
October 5	Amnéville	France	Galaxie Amnéville
October 6	Paris	France	Palais Omnisports de Paris-Bercy
October 8	Antwerp	Belgium	Sportpaleis
October 10	Herning	Denmark	Jyske Bank Boxen
October 11	Malmö	Sweden	Malmö Arena
October 14	Helsinki	Finland	Hartwall Arena
October 16	Stockholm	Sweden	Ericsson Globe
October 18	Cologne	Germany	Lanxess Arena
October 19	Rotterdam	Netherlands	Sportpaleis van Ahoy
October 21	Montpellier	France	Park&Suites Arena
October 24	Dublin	Ireland	The O_{2}
October 25	Belfast	Northern Ireland	Odyssey Arena
October 27	London	England	The O_{2} Arena
October 28	London	England	The O_{2} Arena
October 30	Birmingham	England	LG Arena
October 31	London	England	Wembley Arena
November 3	Newcastle	England	Metro Radio Arena
November 5	Sheffield	England	Motorpoint Arena Sheffield
November 6	Manchester	England	Manchester Arena
November 9	Lisbon	Portugal	Pavilhão Atlântico
November 11 (Note: This concert was a part of 2011 Abu Dhabi Grand Prix.)	Abu Dhabi	United Arab Emirates	Du Arena
November 15	Rio de Janeiro	Brazil	Praça da Apoteose
November 18	São Paulo	Brazil	Anhembi Sambadrome
November 20	La Plata	Argentina	Estadio Ciudad de La Plata
November 22	Santiago	Chile	Estadio Nacional
November 24	Lima	Peru	Explanada del Estadio Monumental
November 26	Bogotá	Colombia	Parque Simon Bolívar
November 28	Caracas	Venezuela	Estadio USB
December 1	Guadalajara	Mexico	Estadio Tres de Marzo
December 3	Mexico City	Mexico	Foro Sol
December 4 (Note: The concert of December 4, 2011 at Plaza de la República in Mexico City was a free concert for residents of Mexico City.)	Mexico City	Mexico	Plaza de la República
December 6	Monterrey	Mexico	Auditorio Banamex
December 8	Santo Domingo	Dominican Republic	Estadio Olímpico
December 10	San Juan	Puerto Rico	Coliseo de Puerto Rico

== Box office score data ==
Venue	City	Attendance	Gross
Staples Center	Los Angeles	12,339 / 12,339 (100%)	$1,581,707
Rose Garden	Portland	7,718 / 8,717 (89%)	$513,297
American Airlines Center	Dallas	11,540 / 12,776 (90%)	$1,181,767
Amway Center	Orlando	11,215 / 12,953 (87%)	$1,032,656
The Palace of Auburn Hills	Auburn Hills	13,144 / 13,144 (100%)	$989,737
Veterans Memorial Arena	Jacksonville	6,001 / 6,441 (93%)	$419,736
Verizon Center	Washington, D.C.	12,023 / 14,084 (85%)	$1,331,270
Izod Center	East Rutherford	15,274 / 15,274 (100%)	$1,750,058
Boardwalk Hall	Atlantic City	8,925 / 11,277 (79%)	$969,570
Bell Centre	Montreal	8,772 / 10,445 (84%)	$942,113
Air Canada Centre	Toronto	21,239 / 21,239 (100%)	$2,456,435
Van Andel Arena	Grand Rapids	7,389 / 9,444 (78%)	$399,018
Sportpaleis	Antwerp	9,323 / 11,868 (78%)	$858,151
The O_{2} Arena	London	24,902 / 26,550 (94%)	$1,818,120
Manchester Arena	Manchester	12,653 / 13,644 (93%)	$978,972
Praça da Apoteose	Rio de Janeiro	13,048 / 35,000 (37%)	$1,493,260
Anhembi Sambadrome	São Paulo	20,644 / 35,000 (59%)	$2,224,890
Estadio Ciudad de La Plata	La Plata	21,717 / 35,613 (61%)	$2,535,020
Estadio USB	Caracas	8,474 / 8,474 (100%)	$3,183,790
Coliseo de Puerto Rico	San Juan	10,634 / 11,637 (91%)	$1,263,710
Total		256,974 / 325,919 (79%)	$27,923,277
