= Big Fat Bass =

2011 song by Britney Spears

Song by Britney Spears featuring will.i.am

from the album Femme Fatale
- Recorded: February 8, 2011
- Studio: Ethernet Studios (Los Angeles); The Record Plant (Hollywood)
- Genre: House
- Length: 4:44
- Label: Jive
- Songwriter: William Adams
- Producer: will.i.am

Audio video
- "Big Fat Bass" on YouTube

"Big Fat Bass" is a song recorded by American singer Britney Spears for her seventh studio album, Femme Fatale (2011). It features the vocal collaboration of American rapper will.i.am. The house song was written and produced by will.i.am as a celebration to the bass and its influence on club music. The song contains a double entendre gender metaphor sung by Spears. "Big Fat Bass" received mixed reviews from contemporary music critics, who deemed it an instant radio and club hit, and also considered it the most old-school work on the album. However, a few reviews considered it as an unfortunate collaboration with will.i.am, and dismissed Spears' heavily processed vocals.

Following the release of Femme Fatale, "Big Fat Bass" charted at number 31 on the South Korean International Singles chart, and at number 18 on Billboard's Hot Dance/Electronic Digital Songs for a week. Spears performed the song at Rain Nightclub, Good Morning America and Jimmy Kimmel Live!. The performance on the latter aired after three months due to technical problems. She has also performed it during the Femme Fatale Tour (2011).

== Background and composition ==
"[I discovered] her love for music. I never seen anyone, like, come alive, full of excitement and giggling and laughing behind the mic. She was like a little kid when she was recording the song and it just brought the whole atmosphere, it changed the whole atmosphere when someone really loves music. So it was great working with her."

— will.i.am on the Spears' work ethic

Spears spoke to V about the sessions for Femme Fatale, commenting that she had been recording the album for two years. On February 8, 2011, Spears tweeted she was in the studio with will.i.am, recording a song for the album. Later, the producer described the collaboration as "a monster. It's mean, pretty, edgy, next level. [...] She's singing fresh over it. It's something that today needs," and unveiled a teaser of the song through a blog message on February 28, 2011. In an interview with Rolling Stone, Spears commented that she is a fan of the Black Eyed Peas, due the fact that the band "make[s] incredibly catchy, fun pop/dance records and I LOVE will.i.am's style. I have always wanted to do a song with him and would love to work with him more in the future. He is so interesting." will.i.am also praised Spears for the song, saying, "Thank you Britney for collaborating it was a pleasure working with you. Thank you for trusting my instincts. You're a doll." "Big Fat Bass" was written and produced by will.i.am, and Spears recorded her vocals for the song at Ethernet Studios in Los Angeles, California and at The Record Plant in Hollywood, California.

"Big Fat Bass"
A 27-second sample of the song's chorus, features Spears' heavily processed vocals over a house beat.

"Big Fat Bass" is a house song with a length of four minutes and forty-five seconds. will.i.am revealed that the song celebrates bass — which he considers the most important element in club music. "Big Fat Bass" opens with piano-infused background and an electronically altered voice of will.i.am singing, "Big fat bass/the big fat bass." As the beat begins, Spears start to rap "I can be the treble, baby/You can be the bass/You can be the bass." Nicole James of MTV News considered the "dramatic piano/house music intro" of the song reminiscent to "Another Night" (1993) by Real McCoy, while Sal Cinquemani of Slant Magazine wrote that it recalls "When I Hear Music" by Debbie Deb. The song's lyrics also intercalates with a double entendre gender metaphor, where Spears sings "It's gettin bigger/The bass is getting bigger". Spears' vocals were also deemed as heavily processed, yet similar to the ones of Fergie and Rihanna.

== Critical reception ==
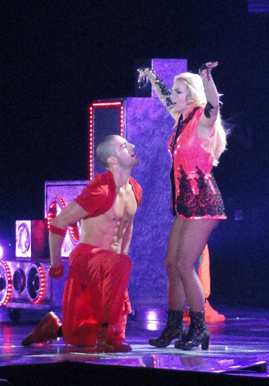
Spears performing "Big Fat Bass" during the Femme Fatale Tour, 2011

Alexis Petridis of The Guardian wrote that "Big Fat Bass" is "the most old-school work" on Femme Fatale, with Robert Copsey of Digital Spy considering the album's production "polished, intriguing and – best of all – fun", exemplifying the piano breakdown in the song. Keith Caulfield of Billboard said he could "completely hear this track blasting in a club, with Spears cooing 'I can be your treble' while the crowd screams back 'you can be my bass!'." The Daily Collegian's stated that the song is "catchy", yet different from "Till the World Ends" and "Hold It Against Me", and added that "the combined star power of Spears and Will.i.am would have surely made it a radio hit." The Independent journalist Andy Gill noted that the album sounds more programmed than natural, but said that the song "sticks to dancefloor essentials". David Buchanan of Consequence of Sound thought that the song "might as well be a B-side to 'The Time (Dirty Bit)' (otherwise known as the most annoying Black Eyed Peas song ever created)." Both Stephen Thomas Erlewine of Allmusic and About.com reviewer Bill Lamb selected it as a top song on Femme Fatale. Lamb further added that the song "will leave you laughing as you sing along on the dance floor."

Rudy Klapper of Sputnikmusic wondered how "Big Fat Bass" is not a Black Eyed Peas song, and further commented that "for every ill-advised will.i.am guest spot... there's an out-of-left field flute... solo that actually works." Thomas Conner of the Chicago Sun-Times considered the song "one unfortunate collaboration," while saying Spears "herself could beat [will.i.am] in a rap battle." Similarly, Eric R. Danton of the Hartford Courant deemed the "banal" song as "characteristically vapid, with a refrain that quickly progresses from inane to annoying." Robert Everett-Green of The Globe and Mail wrote that "Big Fat Bass" is a "verseless tune", and commented that "[will.i.am] thought it would be fun to make [Spears] sound like Rihanna" on the song. Braulio Lorentz of Billboard Brasil said that "even will.i.am can't save [the album]" with "Big Fat Bass". The Idolator staff noted that the song has "all the strengths and weaknesses of your average Black Eyed Peas tune – it's catchy but repetitive, danceable with pretty inconsequential lyrics, and has the potential to become annoying if played too frequently." Writing for Glamour, Christopher Rosa thought it "strips Spears of all personality and leaves her stranded in a sea of headache-inducing beats", and he named it Spears's sixth-worst song of all-time. Rob Sheffield of Rolling Stone was critical: "Imagine how bad a Will.I.Am production for Britney called 'Big Fat Bass' might be. Now multiply that by 10. You have just imagined 'Big Fat Bass.'"

== Live performances ==
Spears first performed "Big Fat Bass" at Rain Nightclub in the Palms Casino Resort on March 25, 2011. Following the performance of "Hold It Against Me", she emerged from a speaker box and danced around the stage, sporting a body-hugging latex bodysuit. The song was remixed for the performance with elements of "Womanizer", "3", "Gimme More" and "I'm a Slave 4 U". Jocelyn Vena of MTV News stated that the performance had Spears' fans amazed. The singer also taped performances of "Hold It Against Me", "Big Fat Bass" and "Till the World Ends" at the Bill Graham Civic Auditorium on March 27, 2011, that aired on Good Morning America on March 29, 2011. Pop Crush's Cristin Maher noted that the singer "definitely let loose more as she popped and locked alongside her dancers, but still failed to wow us with her dancing." The same day, Spears performed the set on Jimmy Kimmel Live!. However, the performance of "Big Fat Bass" aired on May 24, 2011 due to technical problems. The song was added to the setlist of 2011's Femme Fatale Tour. Spears sported a pink latex and lace jacket during the performance, which had a similar setting to early performances of the song. Additionally, will.i.am appeared in the backdrops.

== Credits and personnel ==
Technical

- Recorded and Engineered at Ethernet Studios in Los Angeles, California and The Record Plant in Hollywood, California
- Mixed at The Record Plant in Hollywood, California

Personnel

- Britney Spears – lead vocals
- will.i.am – guest vocals, songwriting, producer, piano, synths, programming, vocal recording
- DJ Ammo – additional programming, synths, piano
- Dylan "3D" Dresdow – mixing
- Padraic "padlock" Kerin – vocal recording

== Charts ==
For the week ending April 7, 2011, "Big Fat Bass" debuted at number 31 on the South Korean International Singles Chart, selling 8,874 digital downloads. It also charted on Billboard's Dance/Electronic Digital Songs on April 16, 2011 at number 18.

=== Weekly charts ===
Chart (2011)	Peak position
South Korea International Singles (Gaon)	31
US Dance/Electronic Digital Songs (Billboard)	18

=== Monthly charts ===
Chart (2011)	Peak position
South Korea Foreign (Circle)	84
