= 3 (Britney Spears song) =

2009 single by Britney Spears

Single by Britney Spears

from the album The Singles Collection
- Released: September 29, 2009
- Recorded: July 2009
- Studio: Maratone (Stockholm)
- Genre: Electropop; dance-pop
- Length: 3:33
- Label: Jive
- Composers: Max Martin; Karl Schuster; Tiffany Amber
- Lyricist: Max Martin
- Producers: Max Martin; Shellback

Britney Spears singles chronology
"Radar" (2009)	"3" (2009)	"Hold It Against Me" (2011)

Music video
- "3" on YouTube

"3" is a song recorded by American singer Britney Spears for her second greatest hits album The Singles Collection (2009). It was written and produced by Max Martin and Shellback, with additional writing from Tiffany Amber. An uptempo electropop song, it features a heavy bassline and synthesizers. Lyrically, the song discusses threesomes, while referencing American folk-singing trio Peter, Paul and Mary during the chorus as sexual slang. It was released as the only single from The Singles Collection on September 29, 2009, by Jive Records.

"3" received critical acclaim, with some reviewers calling it a classic Spears song. A commercial success, it debuted atop the US Billboard Hot 100, becoming her third number-one single. It also reached number one in Canada, and the top 10 in numerous countries, including Australia, Finland, Norway, Sweden and the United Kingdom. The accompanying music video for "3", directed by Diane Martel, features Spears and her dancers in front of different black and white backgrounds. Martel described it as sexy and playful, while contemporary critics gave it positive reviews, complimenting its simplicity. Spears has performed "3" during her Femme Fatale Tour (2011) and her concert residency Britney: Piece of Me (2013–2016).

== Background ==
On July 12, 2009, Spears confirmed through her Twitter account that she had begun recording new material, stating she was going into the studio with Swedish songwriter and producer Max Martin, while she was in Stockholm during the European leg of The Circus Starring Britney Spears. They had previously collaborated on earlier hits including "...Baby One More Time", "Oops!...I Did It Again", "Stronger" and "If U Seek Amy". "3" was written and produced by Martin and Shellback, while additional writing was done by Tiffany Amber. Spears recorded her vocals for the song with the producers at Maratone Studios. John Hanes was responsible for Spears' vocal editing on "3", which was later mixed by Serban Ghenea at MixStar Studios in Virginia Beach, Virginia. On September 23, 2009, Jive Records officially announced the release of a greatest hits titled The Singles Collection through Spears's official website, in celebration of Spears's ten-year anniversary in the music industry, also announcing the release of "3" as the lead single from the album. The artwork for the single was unveiled through Spears' official website on September 28, 2009. "3" was sent to radio stations on September 29, 2009, while being digitally released on October 2, 2009.

== Music and lyrics ==
"3"
"3" has an electropop sound and features Spears singing in a high-pitched voice during the pre-chorus.

"3" is an uptempo electropop song that opens with synths and vocal effects. The song has a basic sequence of Fm–E♭–B♭m–Fm as its chord progression. Spears' vocals span one octave from C_{4} to the high note of C_{5}. During the middle eight, the song slows down with synthetic strings and bass beats, and the section ends with a beat similar to a four-on-the floor, a rhythm pattern popularized in 1970s disco music. Throughout the song, Spears' vocals are autotuned. The song lasts for three minutes and twenty-five seconds. However, eight seconds of silence are added in the end to total the duration to 3:33; a nod to the title of the song.

The song's lyrics are about threesomes. Unlike "If U Seek Amy", the song has no double entendre and it's more straightforward lyrically. The innuendo in the lyrics such as "Merrier the more, triple fun that way" have been compared to the songs in Prince's 1980 studio album Dirty Mind. The chorus has been compared to a playground chant and closes with an extended moan. During the second part of the chorus, there is a reference to the folk group Peter, Paul & Mary. Todd Martens of the Los Angeles Times called the reference "the cut's biggest oddity".

== Critical reception ==
"3" received critical acclaim. Monica Herrera of Billboard commented that the song "builds to a climax of wildly pulsing bass that summons fans to the dancefloor" and added that "[it] will be another notch in this pop provocateur's belt". On its online edition, Rolling Stone's writer Daniel Kreps praised the song for its up-tempo melody and racy lyrics, while comparing it to Flo Rida's recent work, saying that "3" "is more of a surefire dance-floor stomper than anything Brit loaded onto Blackout or Circus". On the printed issue, the magazine gave the song four stars and called it an "instant Britney classic". Clark Collis of Entertainment Weekly called it "a fembot voice, near-seizure-inducing dance-floor frenzy". While crediting the production for "elevating the song above typical dance products", the Los Angeles Times said that Spears sounded "sweetly generic".

In his review of The Singles Collection, Stephen Thomas Erlewine of AllMusic selected "3" as one of the "track picks" and commented, "[it is] much better than any of the three new cuts on My Prerogative". Bill Lamb of About.com said that although the lyrics are controversial, "the bottom line is this is another irresistibly catchy pop confection that beats out most everything else on pop radio today". He praised the chorus and the middle section and called the track "classic Britney". The song was also compared to Madonna's "Celebration", since they "musically present nothing particularly new, but they do manage to encapsulate many of the elements that make the singer a star". A.J. Mayers of MTV picked it as the eighth best song of 2009.

== Commercial performance ==
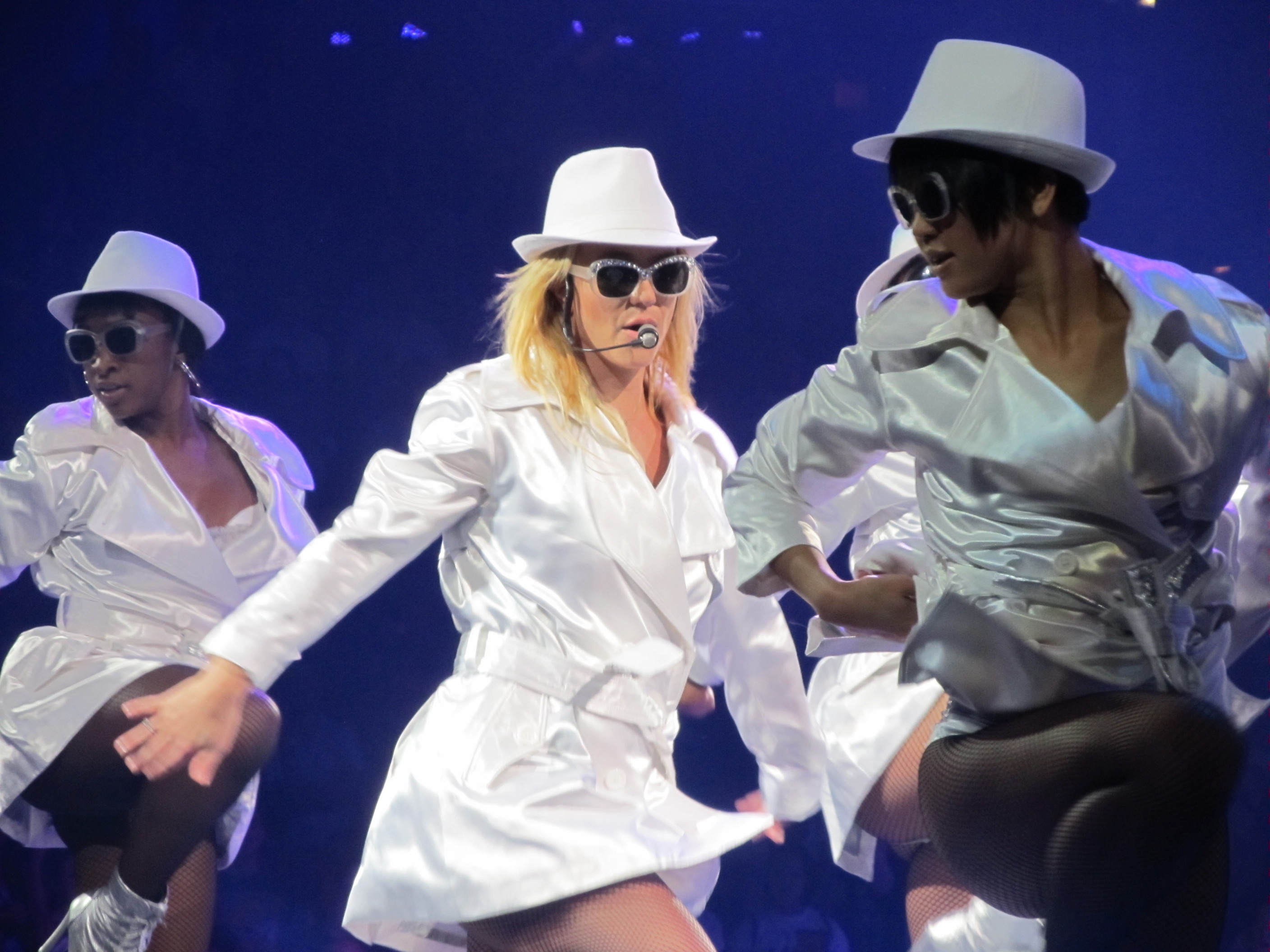
Spears performing the song during the Femme Fatale Tour, 2011

On October 8, 2009, "3" entered at number 14 on the US Billboard Bubbling Under Hot 100 and at number 38 on the US Mainstream Top 40, becoming Spears' 24th career entry on the latter, most among all artists. The following week, the song debuted atop the Billboard Hot 100, becoming Spears' third number-one single in the United States and breaking many of the chart records. It made Spears the first artist in over three years to debut at the top position and the only non-American Idol artist in 11 years to do so. It was the 15th song in the chart history to debut at the top position and also the shortest title for a song reaching the top of the Billboard Hot 100. The song also charted at number one on the Billboard Digital Songs, selling 255,000 downloads in its first week and having the highest one week total of any song, since The Black Eyed Peas' "Boom Boom Pow" in April 2009. As of October 2015, "3" has sold 2.4 million digital downloads in the United States according to Nielsen SoundScan. It is her fourth best-selling digital single in the country. In Canada, the song debuted at number 86 on the Canadian Hot 100 on October 17, 2009, and rose up to number one the following week, making it the biggest jump to number one in the history of the chart. It was certified double platinum by then-Canadian Recording Industry Association (CRIA) for sales over 80,000 copies.

"3" debuted at number 50 on the Australian Singles Chart on October 12, 2009, with only two days of digital sales. It peaked at number six on the week of October 26, 2009. "3" has been certified platinum by the Australian Recording Industry Association (ARIA) with sales of over 70,000 copies. On October 12, 2009, the song debuted at number 16 in New Zealand, making it her highest chart debut since "Womanizer". On its fifth week on the chart, "3" reached its peak position at number 12. On the UK Singles Chart, "3" debuted at number seven on November 16, 2009, becoming Spears' 20th top-10 hit on the chart. According to the Official Charts Company (OCC), the song has sold 145,000 copies there. "3" achieved similar success throughout Europe, reaching the top 10 in Belgium, the Czech Republic, Finland, Norway, and Sweden.

== Music video ==
The music video was filmed on October 5 and October 6, 2009, in Los Angeles. It was directed by Diane Martel and choreographed by Tone & Rich. On October 15, 2009, images of the video were released. A countdown, including images and video previews, was announced on her official website and the release date was revealed to be on October 30, 2009. When asked about the video, Diane Martel said,

"I think it's her next sexy video. It's a very simple video for her – I don't think you've seen her this much under a magnifying glass. Everything's really strong and playful. We collaborated on the wardrobe and had meetings about hair and makeup people, we talked a lot on the phone and met Tone and Rich — two of the best choreographers. [..] [Spears]' so sweet and funny and so normal and down to earth. It's really fun as a director to see her in front of the camera. She's so creative with this stuff. The video is very simple, it's very, very minimal. So it's her, her, her. And she's totally engaging every second. She really knows how to work with a camera and move. I was really impressed, and I have worked almost with every female artist in the business".

The video begins with Spears wearing a sparkly black dress at a dressing table, putting mascara and Circus Fantasy on. Then, it cuts to her holding her hair up and singing the first lines in front of a white background. There are also black and white scenes of her wearing a white leotard behind a foggy glass. She then appears wearing the leotard and glasses, while surrounded by four female dancers wearing black outfits, hanging from a raised barre. The word "sin" is censored and changed for the word "this" during the pre-chorus. In the chorus, she dances in front of a white wall with barcode-like light installations with six male dancers. There also scenes of her dancing provocatively with two male dancers. At the bridge, there are intercut close-ups of her that end with a smirk. The video concludes with Spears dancing with the two male dancers and cuts to a close-up of her looking into the camera.

Rolling Stone writer Daniel Kreps compared the video with the music video of "Single Ladies (Put a Ring on It)" and complimented the choreography saying Spears had not danced with so much conviction since the In the Zone era. Bradley Stern of MuuMuse likened the video's choreography and dancer's wardrobe to Janet Jackson's "Feedback" video. Jocelyn Vena of MTV gave the video a positive review, stating that it's a "sexy, fast-paced clip" and that "there are a few moments in the video where Britney's personality shines" adding that "she smiles at the song's tongue-in-cheek lyrics, particularly when she finishes the song's bridge." Tanner Stransky of Entertainment Weekly complimented the video's choice of wardrobe, but said that the video was "sparse", adding "there's not much to the single besides trite, ridiculous advocation for a ménage à trois anyway, so why would the video go any deeper?".

On December 15, 2009, a director's cut version of the video for "3" leaked online. Kreps commented that the new version "offers up a slightly more NSFW edit of Martel's dance-heavy vid that seems to find a better cadence with the music, as opposed to the original version, which was essentially filmed and edited in the matter of days to coincide with The Singles Collection release".

== Live performances and cover version ==
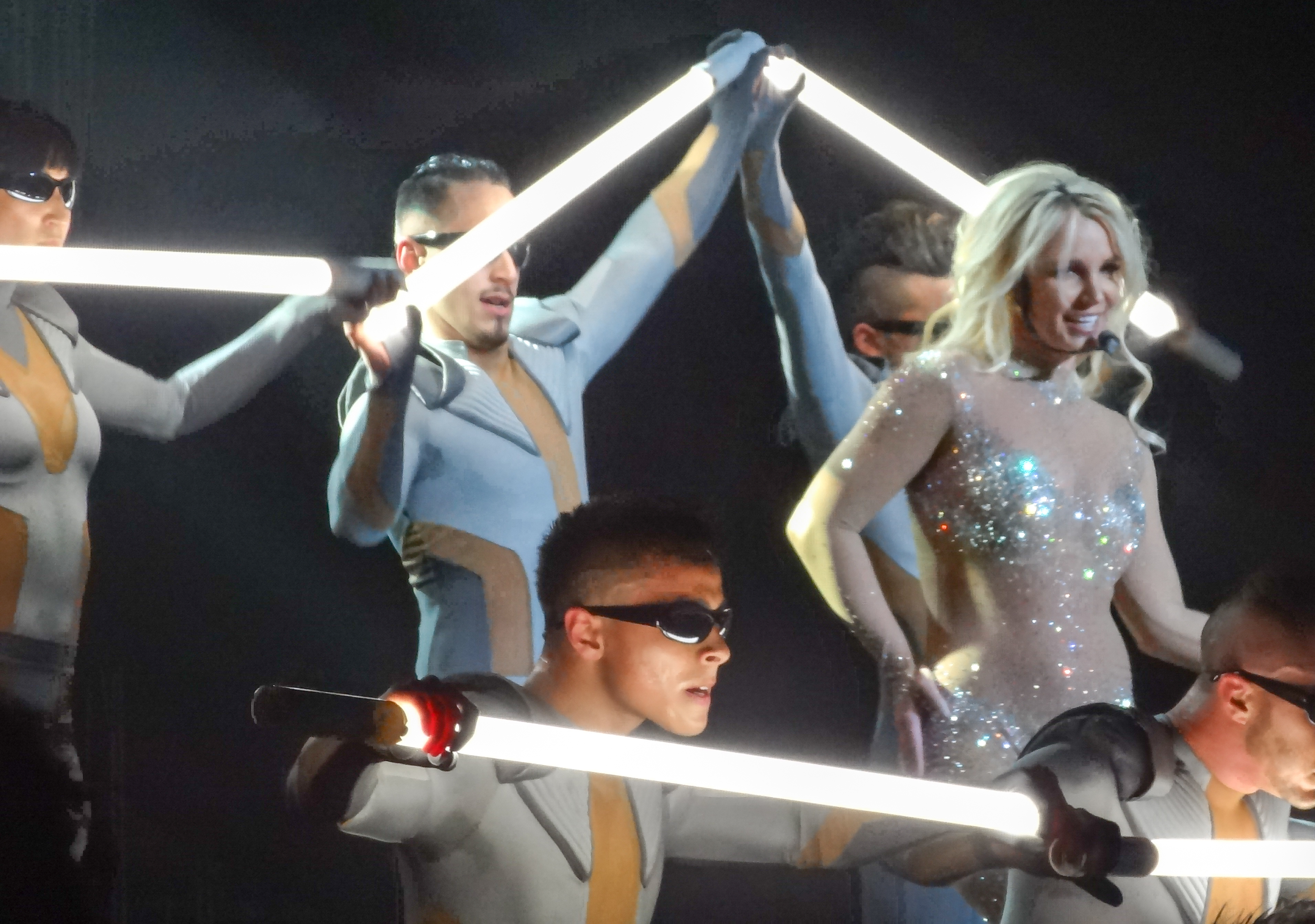
Spears performing "3" at her Las Vegas residency show, Britney: Piece of Me

On March 25, 2011, Spears performed a special show at Rain Nightclub in Las Vegas. The setlist of the show consisted on three songs from her seventh studio album, Femme Fatale, including "Hold It Against Me", "Big Fat Bass" and "Till the World Ends". During the performance of "Big Fat Bass", Spears wore a latex bodysuit and an excerpt of "3" was included in the middle of the performance. Additionally, elements of "Womanizer, "Gimme More" and "I'm a Slave 4 U" were also included. On March 27, 2011, "Big Fat Bass" was also performed at the Bill Graham Civic Auditorium that aired on Good Morning America on March 29, 2011, and the same day, Spears performed the set at Jimmy Kimmel Live!, both with the same "3" excerpt.

"3" was performed at 2011's Femme Fatale Tour, for the first time in its entirety. After "Up n' Down", Spears put on a white fedora and trench coat and performed the song with her female dancers, dressed in a similar style. Shirley Halperin of The Hollywood Reporter named it one of the best performances of the show along with "Piece of Me" and "Don't Let Me Be the Last to Know", stating that "ironically enough, [they] were the ones with fewest frills." Rick Florino of Artistdirect said "'3' gave way to a massive sing-a-long" and added that it "[spoke] right to the noir-ish connotations of the Femme Fatale tour. However, she built a one-of-a-kind space where Kim Basinger's elegant L.A. Confidential beauty becomes enveloped by edgy modern dance attitude."

Spears performed "3" as the third song on her Las Vegas residency, Britney: Piece of Me, as part of the original setlist. After a brief talk with the audience, the singer began a performance of the song, jumping into a triangular cage which was wheeled around by her dancers across the stage. A parallel bar then dropped out of the ceiling, and Spears performed choreography similar to the choreography in song's music video. For Billboard's Keith Caulfield, the song "served as the sexiest jungle gym in Vegas, as Spears and her dancers undulated their way across and around the bar". Girls' Generation member Sunny performed a cover version of the song during the Girls' Generation Tour that took place in 2011 and 2012. A studio version was also released online alongside the live version featuring on the tour album.

== Track listings and formats ==
Digital single

1. "3" – 3:33

CD single and international 2-track digital single

1. "3" – 3:33
2. "3" (instrumental) – 3:33

North American 2-track digital single and The Singles Collection box set single

1. "3" – 3:33
2. "3" (Groove Police Club Mix) – 7:08

International digital EP 1

1. "3" – 3:33
2. "3" (The Knocks Extended Remix) – 5:47
3. "3" (DiscoTech Remix Club Edit) – 4:23
4. "3" (Tonal Club Remix) – 5:04
5. "3" (Trypsin Club Mix) – 7:45

International digital EP 2

1. "3" – 3:33
2. "3" (instrumental) – 3:33
3. "3" (Wolfgang Gartner Extended Club Mix) – 6:35
4. "3" (Groove Police Club Mix) – 7:09
5. "3" (Manhattan Clique Remix Radio) – 3:36

7-inch single

1. "3" – 3:33
2. "3" (instrumental) – 3:33

2026 digital EP

1. "3" – 3:26
2. "3" (Wolfgang Gartner Radio Edit) – 3:44
3. "3" (Wolfgang Gartner Extended Club Remix) – 6:35
4. "3" (Groove Police Radio Mix) – 3:57
5. "3" (Groove Police Club Mix) – 7:09
6. "3" (Groove Police Dub Mixshow) – 7:09
7. "3" (The Knocks Remix) – 3:47
8. "3" (The Knocks Extended Remix) – 5:48
9. "3" (Tonal Remix) – 4:00
10. "3" (Tonal Club Remix) – 5:04
11. "3" (DiscoTech Remix Radio Edit) – 3:42
12. "3" (DiscoTech Remix Club Edit) – 4:24
13. "3" (BOY BOY Radio Remix) – 3:33
14. "3" (BOY BOY Remix) – 4:24
15. "3" (Trypsin Radio Edit) – 4:06
16. "3" (Trypsin Club Mix) – 7:46
17. "3" (Manhattan Clique Remix Radio) – 3:37
18. "3" (Manhattan Clique Remix Club) – 5:42
19. "3" (instrumental) – 3:25

== Credits and personnel ==
- Britney Spears – lead and background vocals
- Max Martin – lyrics, composition, arrangement, production, keyboards, recording, background vocals
- Shellback – composition, arrangement, production, keyboards, guitars, recording
- Tiffany Amber – composition, background vocals
- Serban Ghenea – mixing
- Tim Roberts – assistant engineer
- John Hanes – vocal editing
- Tom Coyne – mastering

== Charts ==
=== Weekly charts ===
2009–2010 weekly chart performance
Chart	Peak position
Australia (ARIA)	6
Austria (Ö3 Austria Top 40)	17
Belgium (Ultratop 50 Flanders)	13
Belgium (Ultratop 50 Wallonia)	8
Canada Hot 100 (Billboard)	1
Canada CHR/Top 40 (Billboard)	2
Canada Hot AC (Billboard)	12
CIS Airplay (TopHit)	37
Czech Republic Airplay (ČNS IFPI)	10
Denmark (Tracklisten)	15
El Salvador (EFE)	9
Euro Digital Songs (Billboard)	3
European Hot 100 Singles (Billboard)	14
European Radio Top 50 (Billboard)	10
Finland (Suomen virallinen lista)	5
France Download (SNEP)	10
Germany (GfK)	18
Global Dance Tracks (Billboard)	9
Hungary (Rádiós Top 40)	12
Ireland (IRMA)	7
Israel International Airplay (Media Forest)	8
Italy (FIMI)	26
Mexico Anglo (Monitor Latino)	4
Netherlands (Dutch Top 40 Tipparade)	2
Netherlands (Single Top 100)	57
New Zealand (Recorded Music NZ)	12
Norway (VG-lista)	10
Romania TV Airplay (Media Forest)	20
Russia Airplay (TopHit)	56
Scottish Singles Sales (Official Charts)	7
Slovakia Airplay (ČNS IFPI)	23
South Korea (Gaon)	19
South Korea International (Gaon)	2
Spain (Promusicae)	38
Sweden (Sverigetopplistan)	2
Switzerland (Schweizer Hitparade)	8
Ukraine Airplay (TopHit)	18
UK Singles (Official Charts)	7
US Billboard Hot 100	1
US Dance Club Songs (Billboard)	16
US Pop Airplay (Billboard)	2
US Rhythmic Airplay (Billboard)	25

=== Year-end charts ===
2009 year-end chart performance
Chart	Position
Australia (ARIA)	59
Belgium (Ultratop 50 Wallonia)	94
Brazil (Crowley Broadcast Analysis)	42
Canada (Canadian Hot 100)	71
Hungary (Rádiós Top 40)	86
Lebanon (NRJ)	40
Sweden (Sverigetopplistan)	51
Taiwan (Yearly Singles Top 100)	93
UK Singles (OCC)	139
US Billboard Hot 100	87

2010 year-end chart performance
Chart	Position
Canada (Canadian Hot 100)	65
Japan Adult Contemporary (Billboard)	88
South Korea Foreign (Circle)	26
US Billboard Hot 100	69
US Mainstream Top 40 (Billboard)	39

== Certifications ==
Certifications and sales
Region	Certification	Certified units/sales
Australia (ARIA)	Platinum	70,000^{^}
Canada (Music Canada)	2× Platinum	80,000^{*}
France	—	28,572
Japan (RIAJ)	Gold	100,000^{*}
New Zealand (RMNZ)	Gold	7,500^{*}
South Korea	—	506,954
United Kingdom (BPI)	Silver	200,000^{‡}
United States (RIAA)	3× Platinum	3,000,000^{‡}
^{*} Sales figures based on certification alone.^{^} Shipments figures based on certification alone.^{‡} Sales+streaming figures based on certification alone.

== Release history ==
Release dates and formats
Region	Date	Format(s)	Version(s)	Label(s)	Ref.
United States	September 29, 2009	Streaming	Original	Jive	
France	October 2, 2009	Digital download	Original	Jive	
United Kingdom	October 2, 2009	Digital download	Original	Jive	
United States	October 2, 2009	Digital download	Original	Jive	
United States	October 5, 2009	Contemporary hit radio	Original	Jive	
Australia	October 7, 2009	Digital download	Original	Sony	
Germany	October 23, 2009	Digital download	Original	Sony	
Australia	November 2, 2009	CD	Original	Sony	
United States	November 10, 2009	Digital download	Original; Groove Police Club Mix	Jive	
Japan	November 11, 2009	Digital download	Original	Sony Japan	
Germany	November 13, 2009	CD	Original	Sony	
United Kingdom	November 15, 2009	Digital download (EP) (Note: The digital EP was made available in two variants.)	Original; remixes	Jive	
United States	November 11, 2025	7-inch vinyl (Note: exclusive to Urban Outfitters)	Original	Legacy	
Various	February 6, 2026	Digital download; streaming (EP)	Original; remixes	RCA	
