= Illuminati II =

Cotton company in Uganda

Illuminati II is a cotton company producing goods made out of organic and fair trade cotton grown in Uganda. The company is owned by the holding company "Noir Illuminati II Holding", established by Danish fashion designer Peter Ingwersen in 2005 with the aim of ensuring socially sustainable practices by controlling aspects of the supply chain. The company's two fashion lines, Noir and Bllack Noir distribute the company's products.

== History ==
NOIR logo designed as an ambigram

Peter Ingwersen founded Noir in 2005. Due to certain difficulties in finding organic yarn goods, Noir was compelled to produce its own fabrics to ensure all links of the supply chain could fulfil the regiment of the code of conduct. Illuminati II was founded to supply the fashion brand with organic and fair trade cotton textiles, as well as refining and improving the quality of the cotton produced in Uganda to obtain a quality which was applicable for a luxury brand. The company's name, Illuminati, was chosen in reference to the act of shedding light to establish themselves as an alternative, in contrast to the rival companies operating through exploitation of the environment and poor labour conditions.

In 2008, Noir presented its cotton-made designs at Estethica, the eco-sustainable initiative organized by the British Fashion Council during both London Fashion Week and Copenhagen Fashion Week. In 2009 and 2010, Noir won Ethical Brand of the Year at the DANSK Fashion Awards.

== Supply chain ==
The company's cotton is grown in the Gulu district of northern Uganda in partnership with Bruce Robertson from Gulu Agricultural Development Ltd, which is responsible for day-to-day work with farmers, supporting and supervising the cultivation and harvest. Bruce Robertson currently works with 10,000 farmers in Uganda, organized into a cooperative. Outside of cotton, the farmers also have been growing other crops like chilli and sesame. Once the harvest is over, the farmers sell their crop to Gulu Agricultural Development Ltd. who then pays for the harvest by the fair trade principles. The crop is certified by Union. Once the cotton is spun into yarn locally in Kampala, the capital of Uganda, the yarn is transported to Turkey and woven into the final Illuminati II fabrics.

== Mission statement ==
The company aims to support smallholder farmers in Uganda and to eventually maintain its entire production line in the country. The fair trade certification of the cotton ensures a fair price and focus on good working conditions for the farmers and respect for the local communities involved. CSR is implemented by adherence to the principles of the UN Global Compact. The local partner, Bruce Robertson, is certified by Union, which ensures Robertson adheres to ILO conventions and the farmers get a fair price for their crop.

All textile processing chemicals used by Illuminati II have GOTS certificates (Global Organic Textile Standard). Illuminati II has been accepted into Material ConneXion's library of innovative materials.
