= Ted Kenney =

American film producer

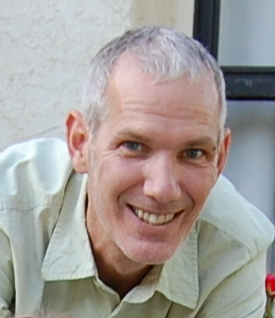
- Ted Kenney
- Born: June 29, 1966 (age 60); Greenfield, Massachusetts
- Occupation: Director of Production
- Known for: U2 3D, The Real World, Katy Perry: Part of Me
- Website: 3alitytechnica.com

Ted Kenney is the current director, field and technical operations at Fox Sports. (2015) At Fox Sports, Ted played a role in executing the first live, multi camera VR (virtual reality) shoot at the 2015 US Open.

Before Fox, Ted was the director of production at 3ality Technica from 2006 to 2012. He advised clients in every aspect of the stereoscopic 3D (S3D) production process. His recent achievements have earned him the label as the industry's leading producer/director for S3D live broadcast. Ted's background in the industry encompasses a wide range of entertainment media. From TV, film, documentaries, sports, comedy, concerts and, S3D live broadcasts. Ted is a member of the Producers Guild of America and the Academy of Television Arts and Sciences and received his Bachelor of Arts and Sciences degree from Florida State University.

This list of credits includes the reality TV's show, MTV's The Real World. Ted produced five seasons of The Real World (Paris, San Diego, Philadelphia, Austin and Key West). Two of these seasons were the top two rated seasons of the twenty plus season run of MTV's flagship show.

Ted has experience in live broadcast productions such as Radio City's Halftime Show for Super Bowl XXXII and Super Bowl XXXIII, The Centennial Olympic Games opening and closing ceremonies, ESPN's 50th Anniversary Special, President Clinton's Inaugural Gala, and even directing FIFA World Cup Beach Soccer.

== Career ==
In the earlier years of his career, Ted produced concert events such as, Rush in Rio and Courtney Love's Celebrity Skin concert. Ted at one time oversaw all news programming on the west coast for both VH1 and MTV, worked on the 1998 and 1999 MTV Movie Awards, as well as many other shows like Howard Stern Specials, MTV's Rock n' Jock, four separate Friars Roast for Comedy Central and thirty episodes of FANatiic.

Since joining 3ality Technica in 2006 to produce U2 3D, Ted has filmed numerous concerts in 3D. Ted is known for directing and producing the first live concert broadcast in S3D of The Black Eyed Peas: The E.N.D. World Tour. This broadcast was recognized by the International 3D Society and earned the 2011 3D Creative Arts Awards (LUMIERE AWARD) in the category of best 3D live event. Also, the Dimensions 3 Expo honored his work of The Black Eyed Peas performing "Meet Me Halfway" in the live 3D category. Another Lumiere Award from the International 3D Society was given to the Guitar Center Sessions featuring Jane's Addiction and Peter Gabriel for DirectTV. Other Guitar Center Sessions he directed included Buddy Guy, The Cult, Joe Bonamassa and Kenny Wayne Shepherd. Ted went on to produce and direct the Britney Spears Live: The Femme Fatale Tour in 2011 which has reached Platinum status in DVD sales. Ted Kenney directed the 3D concert portion of the first live 3D country music concert movie: Kenny Chesney Summer in 3D. Ted also produced the 3D concert in the box office hit Katy Perry: Part of Me, and is currently directing concert footage of JLo's Dance Again World Tour for a concert film/documentary to be released in 2013.

Ted was in charge of filming the space shuttle Endeavour's landing, and directing the 3D and 2D shoot of the Endeavour Transport from LAX to the California Science Center where the footage will be on display along with the space shuttle.
