= Sandy Climan =

American film producer

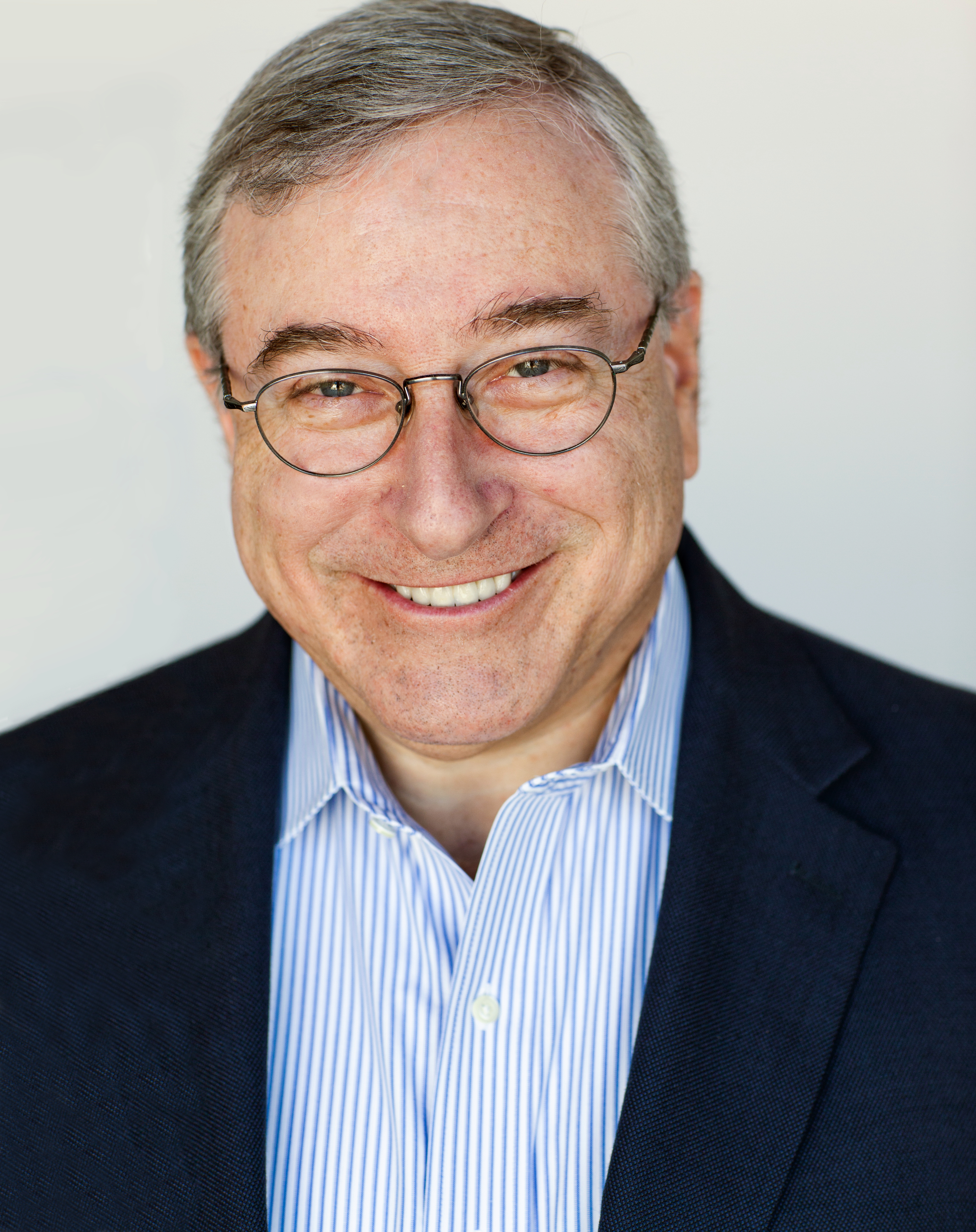
- Born: Sanford R. Climan; The Bronx, New York, U.S.
- Education: Harvard University
- Occupation: Film producer
- Years active: 1985 – present
- Organization: Entertainment Media Ventures
- Notable work: The Aviator; U2 3D
- Awards: Golden Globe Award for Best Motion Picture (The Aviator) 2004; BAFTA Award for Best Film (The Aviator) 2004
- Website: http://www.emventures.com

Sanford (Sandy) Climan is an American film producer, best known for Martin Scorsese's The Aviator and the film U2 3D. He is the Founder and President of Entertainment Media Ventures, a Los Angeles-based strategic advisory and media investment company.

== Early life and education ==
Climan was born in The Bronx, New York and attended The Bronx High School of Science, where he was valedictorian of his senior class, a Westinghouse Science Talent Search scholar, and a National Merit winner.

Climan earned a Master of Business Administration degree from Harvard Business School, a Master of Science degree in Health Policy and Management from Harvard School of Public Health, and a Bachelor of Arts degree from Harvard College, where he was Treasurer of the Harvard Lampoon.

== Career ==
Mr. Climan has held senior management positions in the media and entertainment industry throughout his career and is considered a "media visionary". In addition, he has been an active investor in, and advisor to, venture capital firms and early-stage companies in media, technology, and healthcare.

Climan began his career at MGM, in multiple executive positions in motion picture production, distribution and pay-television and, during 1985–86, in feature film production. He then served as the President of Lions Gate Studios, as the President of Wescom Productions, and as Vice President of Production for The David Gerber Company.

From 1986 to 1995 and 1997–99, he served as a member of the senior management team at CAA, both as the founding head of CAA's corporate representation practice and as a talent agent. He represented multiple well-known actors including Robert De Niro, Robert Redford, Kevin Costner, and Danny DeVito, directors such as Michael Mann, as well as many prominent film and television production companies. During his time at CAA, he worked with Sony on its acquisition of Columbia Pictures, with Matsushita Electric on its acquisition of MCA/Universal, and with Credit Lyonnais on its restructuring of MGM, Coca-Cola, NYNEX, Bell Atlantic, and multiple other Fortune 500 companies. During 1995–97, he served as the Corporate Executive and Vice President of Worldwide Business Development of MCA/Universal Studios.

In 1999, he founded Entertainment Media Ventures, which provides media investment and strategic advisory work for the media and entertainment industry.

From 2002 to 2003, he was the Co-Executive Producer and Producer on the CBS primetime series Robbery Homicide Division. In 2004, he produced Martin Scorsese's biographical drama film The Aviator, starring Leonardo DiCaprio and Cate Blanchett, for which he won the 2005 BAFTA Award for Best Film and the 2004 Golden Globe Award for Best Motion Picture. The film was also nominated for a Satellite Award for Best Film, a Broadcast Film Critics Award for Best Film, an OFTA Award for Best Picture, and an ACCA Award for Best Motion Picture. In 2006, Climan spoke about the film market, investors, and the business of film on a panel of experts at the Milken Institute.

In 2007, he was the Co-Executive Producer of the first digital live-action 3D film U2 3D, which screened at Cannes Film Festival that year and at Sundance Film Festival the following year. In 2008, the film won the Giant Screen Cinema Association Achievement Award for Best Film Produced Non-Exclusively for the Giant Screen, the Los Premios MTV Latinoamérica Award for Best Musical Film, and the 3D Film and Interactive Film Festival's Pioneer Award for Film and Television.

From 2007 to 2010, Climan served as the first CEO of 3ality Digital. In 2009, he received The Caucus for Producers, Writers and Directors New Visions Award along with Steve Schklair, for their work with 3ality Digital. In 2016, he was the Executive Producer on the Lionsgate film Manhattan Night, starring Adrien Brody.

Mr. Climan serves on multiple charitable boards, including for the American Cinematheque, the UCLA School of Theater, Film, and Television, and the UCLA Longevity Center of the Semel Institute for Neurosciences and Human Behavior. From 2000 to 2012, Mr. Climan served as a member of the Advisory Committee to the Director of the U.S. Centers for Disease Control and Prevention. For over twenty years, Mr. Climan served on the board of the Fulfillment Fund, the leading organization for mentoring at-risk public high school students in Los Angeles. Mr. Climan serves as an advisor on entertainment and media to the World Economic Forum at its annual gathering in Davos, Switzerland, as a member of the Reuters Editorial Advisory Board, the philanthropic advisory board of Lifestyles Magazine, the advisory board of the Yale CEO Leadership Institute of the Yale School of Management, and as a member of the Advisory Committee to the Ellis Island Honors Society.

He supports several philanthropic organizations, including the Motion picture and Television Fund.

== Filmography ==
=== Film ===
Year	Title	Position	Notes	Ref.
1984	Almost You	Executive producer		
1986	3:15 the Moment of Truth	Executive producer		
1986	The Malibu Bikini Shop	Executive producer		
2004	The Aviator	Producer	BAFTA Award for Best Film; Golden Globe Award for Best Motion Picture – Drama; Nominated–ACCA Award for Best Motion Picture; Nominated–Critics' Choice Movie Award for Best Picture; Nominated–OFTA Award for Best Picture; Nominated–Satellite Award for Best Film	
2007	U2 3D	Executive producer	3D Film and Interactive Film Festival's Pioneer Award for Film and Television; Giant Screen Cinema Association Achievement Award for Best Film Produced Non-Exclusively for the Giant Screen; Los Premios MTV Latinoamérica Award for Best Musical Film	
2011	Best Player	Executive producer	TV movie	
2016	Manhattan Night	Executive producer		
	Manhunt	Producer		

=== Television ===
Year	Title	Position	Notes	Ref.
2002–03	Robbery Homicide Division	Co-Executive Producer, Producer		

== Awards and nominations ==
Year	Nominee / work	Award	Result
2004	The Aviator	Golden Globe Award for Best Motion Picture – Drama	Won
2004	The Aviator	OFTA Award for Best Picture	Nominated
2004	The Aviator	ACCA Award for Best Motion Picture	Nominated
2005	The Aviator	BAFTA Award for Best Film	Won
2005	The Aviator	Satellite Award for Best Film	Won
2005	The Aviator	Critics' Choice Movie Award for Best Picture	Nominated
2008	U2 3D	Los Premios MTV Latinoamérica Award for Best Musical Film	Won
2008	U2 3D	Giant Screen Cinema Association Achievement Award for Best Film Produced Non-Exclusively for the Giant Screen	Won
2008	U2 3D	3D Film and Interactive Film Festival's Pioneer Award for Film and Television	Won

- In 2009, he received The Caucus for Producers, Writers and Directors New Visions Award along with Steve Schklair, for their work with 3ality Digital.
- In 2018, he received the Ellis Island Medal of Honor.
