= Britney Spears Live: The Femme Fatale Tour =

2011 concert special

- Promotional poster
- Genre: Concert
- Directed by: Ted Kenney
- Starring: Britney Spears
- Country of origin: United States
- Original language: English

Production
- Producers: Britney Spears; Larry Rudolph; Adam Leber; Gari Ann Douglass; Steve Schklair; Domenic Cotter; Ted Kenney; Jennifer Lynn Vidas
- Editors: George Bellias; Don Wilson
- Running time: 84 minutes
- Production companies: 3ality Digital; Media Blasters

Original release
- Network: Epix
- Release: November 12, 2011

Britney Spears Live: The Femme Fatale Tour is a 2011 concert special by American entertainer Britney Spears, documenting the August 13 and 14, 2011 shows of the Femme Fatale Tour. Filmed at the Air Canada Centre in Toronto, the show was shot in 2D and 3D by 3ality Digital, and premiered on Epix on November 12, 2011. BBC Worldwide attained distribution rights of the show outside the United States. The special portrays a story in which Spears is a secret agent chased by a stalker, and features guest appearances by Nicki Minaj and Sabi. Britney Spears Live: The Femme Fatale Tour received mixed reviews from critics.

== Background ==
On August 12, 2011, Spears announced through her Twitter account that the Toronto shows at the Air Canada Centre would be taped to air on the Epix television channel, and for release on DVD. Within minutes of her announcement, traffic to EPIX social sites doubled and Britney Spears became a worldwide trending topic on Twitter. The show, initially titled Britney Spears: Femme Fatale, was shot in 2D and 3D by 3ality Digital to premiere in November on Epix, as well as on EPIX on Demand and EpixHD.com. Epix president and CEO Mark Greenberg said, "EPIX is dedicated to bringing fans closer to the talent they love and we are pleased to connect this truly iconic American star to her large and passionate fan base." It was her first televised concert since The Onyx Hotel Tour was broadcast on Showtime on March 28, 2004. The show was announced to premiere on November 12, 2011, at 20:00 EST (01:00 UTC). On September 9, 2011, it was announced by the BBC that BBC Worldwide had attained distribution rights of the show outside the United States. The 2D version would be available for broadcast from Christmas Eve 2011, with the 3D version available in February 2012. Along with concerts by Alice Cooper and Elbow, the Femme Fatale Tour is going to be one of the first 3D music offerings by the BBC Worldwide, and was available to broadcasters at the 2011 edition of Mipcom. Two teaser trailers for the show were released on September 13 and October 10, 2011, respectively. Clips of some of the performances, including "3", "(Drop Dead) Beautiful", "I'm a Slave 4 U" and "Boys", were released days prior to the premiere.

== Content ==
The show, divided in five segments, portrays a story in which Spears is a secret agent, who is chased by a stalker; played by Rudolf Martin. The first section begins with "Hold It Against Me" and features her escaping from prison along with other female inmates. The second segment displays upbeat dance numbers, including "Big Fat Bass" which features will.i.am on the backdrops, and "Lace and Leather", in which she interacts with a member of the audience named Alex. The third section features an Egyptian/Indian theme with fireworks and acrobatics, and Spears is joined by Sabi during the performance of "(Drop Dead) Beautiful". The fourth segment, set in London, displays energetic routines and motorcycle costumes. The encore begins with a video interlude of Spears capturing the stalker, and continues with a Tokyo-inspired performance of "Toxic" in which she defeats a group of ninjas. The show ends with "Till the World Ends", which features a guest appearance by Nicki Minaj performing her verse from the Femme Fatale Remix of the song.

== Reception ==
Jocelyn Vena of MTV stated, "Look out for cameos from Nicki Minaj and Sabi, killer dancing, beautifully designed costumes, elaborate stage setups and a set list that even the biggest Britney critic couldn't help but shake their groove thing to." Tanner Stransky from Entertainment Weekly gave the special a B+, and said that the live show "is a pop-music pleasure and a lesson in how to stage an arena tour. Watching it on TV — here in unbeweavably glorious HD — is certainly the next best thing." Stransky added that the special "conjures up a detail-focused experience that allows you to see the little things, from Spears' poor attempts at hiding her bad extensions to the sinewy wonders that are her dancers." Neal Justin of the Star Tribune said the special "proves once and for all that Spears has lost the ability to dance. The expensive set pieces are impressive, but the 'singer's' inability to shake her tail feather is downright criminal." Kelsea Stahler of the New York Post criticized many elements of the show, including the storyline and the costumes, and added that "you [know] you [are] headed for disappointment, but it's Britney. You have to watch. [...] Your pimply, adolescent self said you'd love Britney forever no matter what; and part of you still believes that."

== Video release ==
Britney Spears Live: The Femme Fatale Tour

Video by Britney Spears
- Released: November 21, 2011
- Recorded: August 13–14, 2011
- Venues: Air Canada Centre, Toronto, Canada
- Genre: Dance-pop
- Length: 86 minutes
- Label: RCA

Britney Spears chronology
Britney: For the Record (2009)	Britney Spears Live: The Femme Fatale Tour (2011)

=== Track listing ===
DVD / Blu-ray track listing
No.	Title	Length
1.	"Femme Fatale" (Video Introduction)	2:18
2.	"Hold It Against Me"	4:33
3.	"Up n' Down"	3:41
4.	"3"	3:56
5.	"Piece of Me"	1:35
6.	"Sweet Seduction" (Video Interlude)	2:35
7.	"Big Fat Bass" (with will.i.am)	4:09
8.	"How I Roll"	3:38
9.	"Lace and Leather"	3:14
10.	"If U Seek Amy"	3:48
11.	"Temptress" (Video Interlude)	2:24
12.	"Gimme More"	3:28
13.	"(Drop Dead) Beautiful" (with Sabi)	3:47
14.	"Don't Let Me Be the Last to Know"	3:27
15.	"Boys"	4:01
16.	"Code Name: Trouble" (Video Interlude)	2:03
17.	"...Baby One More Time"	1:36
18.	"S&M (Remix)"	2:03
19.	"Trouble for Me"	3:05
20.	"I'm a Slave 4 U"	3:12
21.	"I Wanna Go"	4:01
22.	"Womanizer"	4:44
23.	"Sexy Assassin" (Video Interlude)	1:45
24.	"Toxic"	4:58
25.	"Till the World Ends" (with Nicki Minaj)	5:08
26.	"Credits"	2:46
Total length:		85:55

Blu-ray Bonus – Music Videos
No.	Title	Director	Length
1.	"Hold It Against Me" (Music video)	Jonas Åkerlund	4:35
2.	"Till the World Ends" (Music video)	Ray Kay	4:04
3.	"I Wanna Go" (Music video)	Chris Marrs Piliero	4:41
4.	"Criminal" (Music video)	Chris Marrs Piliero	5:26
Total length:			18:46

Deluxe DVD – Remix CD
No.	Title	Writer(s)	Producer(s)	Length
1.	"Hold It Against Me" (Jacob Plant Remix)	Max Martin, Lukasz Gottwald, Mathieu Jomphe, Bonnie McKee	Dr. Luke, Max Martin, Billboard (remix and additional production by Jacob Plant)	4:26
2.	"Hold It Against Me" (Linus Loves Remix)	Martin, Gottwald, Jomphe, McKee	Dr. Luke, Max Martin, Billboard (remix by Linus Loves)	5:09
3.	"Hold It Against Me" (The Alias Club Remix)	Martin, Gottwald, Jomphe, McKee	Dr. Luke, Max Martin, Billboard (remix by The Alias)	4:03
4.	"Till the World Ends" (Olli Collins & Fred Portelli Remix)	Lukasz Gottwald, Max Martin, Alexander Kronlund, Kesha Sebert	Dr. Luke, Max Martin, Billboard (remix by Olli Collins & Fred Portelli)	11:22
5.	"Till the World Ends" (Billionaire Remix)	Gottwald, Martin, Kronlund, Sebert	Dr. Luke, Max Martin, Billboard (remix by Billionaire AKA Sergei Hall & Kieron McTernan)	5:21
6.	"Till the World Ends" (Garyth Wyn Remix)	Gottwald, Martin, Kronlund, Sebert	Dr. Luke, Max Martin, Billboard (additional production by Garyth Wyn & Dave Parkinson at beat that studios, London)	6:24
7.	"I Wanna Go" (Moguai Remix)	Max Martin, Savan Kotecha, Shellback	Max Martin, Shellback (remix and additional production by Moguai)	7:11
8.	"I Wanna Go" (Pete Phantom Remix)	Martin, Kotecha, Shellback	Max Martin, Shellback (remix and additional production by Peter Hammerton)	3:20
9.	"I Wanna Go" (Vada Remix)	Martin, Kotecha, Shellback	Max Martin, Shellback (remix and additional production by Harry Diamond)	7:39
10.	"Scary"	Britney Spears, Fraser T Smith, Kasia Livingston	Fraser T Smith	3:40
Total length:				58:28

=== Weekly charts ===
Chart (2011)	Peak position
Australian Music DVD (ARIA)	8
Belgium Music DVD (Ultratop Flanders)	10
Belgium Music DVD (Ultratop Wallonia)	4
Czech Music DVD (IFPI)	11
Dutch Music DVD (MegaCharts)	24
French Music DVD (SNEP)	4
Finnish Music DVD (IFPI Finland)	5
Hungarian Music DVD (MAHASZ)	6
Italian Music DVD (FIMI)	1
Japanese Music DVD (Oricon)	13
Mexican Music DVD (AMPROFON)	1
Portuguese Music DVD (AFP)	21
Spanish Music DVD (PROMUSICAE)	14
Swedish Music DVD (Sverigetopplistan)	6
Swiss Music DVD (Swiss Hitparade)	6
UK Music Video (OCC)	22
US Music Videos Sales (Billboard)	2

=== Year-end charts ===
Chart (2012)	Peak position
US Music Videos Sales (Billboard)	10

=== Certifications ===
Region	Certification	Certified units/sales
Australia (ARIA)	Gold	7,500^{^}
United States (RIAA)	Platinum	100,000^{^}
^{^} Shipments figures based on certification alone.

=== Release history ===
Country	Date
United States	November 21, 2011
Australia	November 25, 2011
United Kingdom	November 28, 2011
Germany	December 16, 2011
Thailand	January 19, 2012
