= The Amazing Spider-Man (film) =

2012 film by Marc Webb

- Theatrical release poster
- Directed by: Marc Webb
- Screenplay by: James Vanderbilt; Alvin Sargent; Steve Kloves
- Story by: James Vanderbilt
- Based on: Spider-Man by: Stan Lee; Steve Ditko
- Produced by: Laura Ziskin; Avi Arad; Matt Tolmach
- Starring: Andrew Garfield; Emma Stone; Rhys Ifans; Denis Leary; Campbell Scott; Irrfan Khan; Martin Sheen; Sally Field
- Cinematography: John Schwartzman
- Edited by: Alan Edward Bell; Pietro Scalia
- Music by: James Horner
- Production companies: Columbia Pictures; Marvel Entertainment; Laura Ziskin Productions; Arad Productions; Matt Tolmach Productions
- Distributed by: Sony Pictures Releasing
- Release dates: June 13, 2012 (Tokyo); July 3, 2012 (United States)
- Running time: 136 minutes
- Country: United States
- Language: English
- Budget: $200–230 million (Note: The official cost of The Amazing Spider-Man is unknown; however, various estimates put its cost at $200 million, $215 million, $220 million, and $230 million.)
- Box office: $758.7 million

The Amazing Spider-Man is a 2012 American superhero film based on the Marvel Comics character Spider-Man. Directed by Marc Webb and written by James Vanderbilt, Alvin Sargent, and Steve Kloves from a story by Vanderbilt, it is a reboot of the Spider-Man film series. It stars Andrew Garfield, Emma Stone, Rhys Ifans, Denis Leary, Campbell Scott, Irrfan Khan, Martin Sheen, and Sally Field. The plot of the film follows the teenager Peter Parker (Garfield) who gains spider-like abilities and fights crime as Spider-Man, while also attempting to live an ordinary life.

Development of the film began in 2010 following the cancellation of Spider-Man 4, which would have been the fourth film in Sam Raimi's Spider-Man series starring Tobey Maguire. Columbia Pictures opted to reboot the franchise with the same production team, with Vanderbilt staying on to write, and Sargent and Kloves assisting with the script. Using the RED Epic camera, principal photography occurred in Los Angeles and New York City between December 2010 and May 2011. 3ality Technica provided 3D image processing, while Sony Pictures Imageworks handled CGI effects. It was the last film written by Sargent before his death in 2019.

Sony Pictures Entertainment promoted the film with a viral marketing campaign and tie-ins including a video game by Beenox and Activision. The Amazing Spider-Man premiered in Tokyo on June 13, 2012, and was released in 2D, 3D, IMAX 3D, and 4DX formats in the United States on July 3 by Sony Pictures Releasing through its Columbia Pictures label. The film received generally positive reviews from critics and grossed $758.7 million worldwide, making it the seventh-highest-grossing film of 2012. A sequel, The Amazing Spider-Man 2, was released in 2014. In 2021, Garfield and Ifans reprised their roles in the Marvel Cinematic Universe film Spider-Man: No Way Home, which explored the concept of the multiverse and linked the Spider-Man series directed by Jon Watts to the films directed by Webb and Raimi.

== Plot ==
After discovering that his home office has been burglarized, scientist Richard Parker and his wife Mary flee to an unknown destination, leaving their young son Peter in the care of his Aunt May and Uncle Ben.

Years later, a teenage Peter attends Midtown Science High School in New York City. He is intelligent, but socially awkward and often bullied. He has a crush on Gwen Stacy, who returns his feelings. Peter discovers his father's briefcase and learns from Ben that his father was a friend of Dr. Curt Connors, a scientist at Oscorp in the field of cross-species genetics. Hoping to learn about his father's work, Peter sneaks into a restricted laboratory at Oscorp, where a genetically modified spider bites him. He develops spider-like abilities, including superhuman strength, agility, speed, and the ability to cling to surfaces.

Connors, whose right arm has been amputated, is conducting experiments to regenerate limbs. Peter discovers the missing piece to Connors' research, the "decay rate algorithm", in his father's papers. Peter visits Connors, reveals that he is Richard's son, and gives Connors the algorithm. At home, Peter and Ben argue, and Peter leaves. While searching for Peter, Ben is killed by a thief. Under the alias Spider-Man, Peter uses his new abilities to track down criminals matching the killer's description. He creates a mask with yellow-tinted glasses and a spandex suit to hide his identity, and builds mechanical web-shooters using a web formula developed by Oscorp. At dinner with Gwen's family, he discovers her father is police captain George Stacy, who holds a grudge against Spider-Man. After arguing with Captain Stacy, Peter reveals his double identity to Gwen, and they kiss.

Connors' superior, Rajit Ratha, demands that Connors begin human trials with his formula to regrow limbs using lizard DNA. Connors refuses to rush into testing, as it could put innocent people at risk. Ratha fires Connors and decides to test the serum at a Veterans Administration hospital. Desperate, Connors tries the formula on himself, passes out, and awakens to find that his missing arm has regenerated. While trying to intercept Ratha on the Williamsburg Bridge, Connors turns into a humanoid reptilian monster and begins a violent rampage; Peter arrives and saves people from Connors' attacks. Unable to piece together a narrative for the incident, the police issue a city-wide manhunt for both the Lizard and Spider-Man.

Connors discovers that Peter is Spider-Man and attacks him at school. Peter pursues Connors into the underground sewer system, where he finds a makeshift lab. He realizes that Connors is planning to release a biochemical agent from Oscorp Tower, which will turn everyone in the city into reptilian hybrids like himself. As Peter tries to stop Connors, the police corner him, and Captain Stacy discovers his double identity. Stacy lets Peter go after Connors, while Gwen creates an antidote for Connors' chemical agent. While Stacy occupies Connors in battle, Peter disperses the antidote into the city, curing Connors and his victims. Dying from wounds inflicted by Connors, Stacy asks Peter to stay away from Gwen to keep her safe. Peter tries to honor this request, but realizes both he and Gwen are unhappy, and he hints to her that he may not keep his promise.

== Cast ==
- Andrew Garfield as Peter Parker / Spider-Man: A highly intelligent and introverted teenager who develops spider-like abilities after being bitten by a genetically-modified spider. Max Charles plays a young Peter Parker.
- Emma Stone as Gwen Stacy: Peter's high school classmate and his love interest. She is an intern at Oscorp. (Note: Attributed to multiple references:)
- Rhys Ifans as Dr. Curt Connors / Lizard: A leading scientist at Oscorp who attempts to engineer a serum to regrow human limbs. After testing the serum on himself, he transforms into a large reptilian monster.
- Denis Leary as George Stacy: A police captain and Gwen's father. He distrusts Spider-Man and seeks to apprehend both him and the Lizard.
- Campbell Scott as Richard Parker: Peter's father. He is a former Oscorp scientist who intentionally disappeared with his wife for unknown reasons.
- Irrfan Khan as Rajit Ratha: An Oscorp executive and Connors' immediate superior.
- Martin Sheen as Ben Parker: Peter's uncle and Richard's brother.
- Sally Field as May Parker: Ben's wife and Peter's aunt.
- Embeth Davidtz as Mary Parker: Peter's mother.
- Chris Zylka as Flash Thompson: A bully at Peter's school.

Leif Gantvoort plays the burglar who shoots Uncle Ben, and Michael Barra plays T-Bone, the store clerk. Tom Waite plays Nicky, a thug whom Peter mistakes for his uncle's killer. Hannah Marks portrays Missy Kallenback, a shy girl who has a crush on Peter, while Kelsey Chow appears as Hot Girl. (Note: Chow stated in an interview that her character is Sally Avril of Marvel Comics.) C. Thomas Howell plays the father of a boy rescued by Spider-Man, while Spider-Man co-creator Stan Lee has a cameo appearance as a school librarian. Michael Massee plays the mysterious man who talks with Connors in his prison cell in a brief scene during the end credits. (Note: The character was revealed to be Gustav Fiers in The Amazing Spider-Man 2.) (Note: Attributed to multiple references:) Michael Papajohn, who appeared as the burglar Dennis Carradine in Spider-Man (2002), has a cameo as Alfred, Dr. Ratha's limo driver. Papajohn asked to reprise the role of the burglar in The Amazing Spider-Man, but the part was given to Gantvoort. Kari Coleman portrays Gwen's mother Helen Stacy, while Charlie DePew, Skyler Gisondo and Jacob Rodier play Gwen's brothers Philip, Howard, and Simon respectively.

== Production ==
=== Development ===
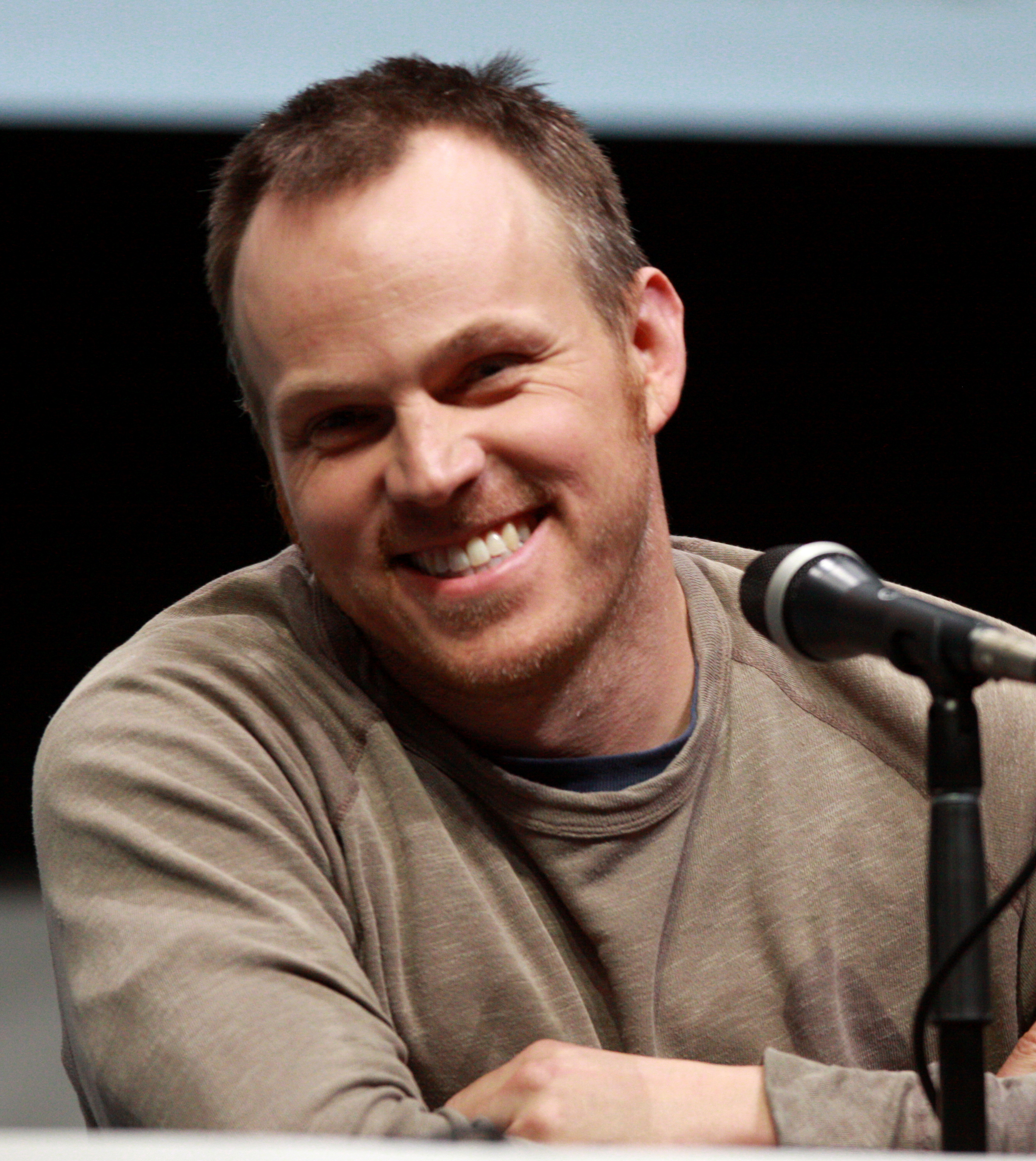
The Amazing Spider-Man was director Marc Webb's second feature film

Following the release of Sam Raimi's Spider-Man 3 (2007), Sony Pictures Entertainment announced a May 6, 2011 release date for the next film in the series. By this time, James Vanderbilt, David Lindsay-Abaire and Gary Ross had written several screenplays for the film, which were rejected by Raimi. Alvin Sargent, who co-wrote Spider-Man 2 and Spider-Man 3, was working on yet another script. On January 11, 2010, Columbia Pictures and Marvel Studios announced that instead of continuing the Raimi series, they were rebooting the series with a new cast and crew. Deadline Hollywood reported that Raimi had pulled out of the project, and the studio did not want to continue the series without him. Additionally, Avi Arad felt that the writers had not produced a story of sufficient quality to warrant a continuation of the Raimi series. Arad, Matt Tolmach and Laura Ziskin were retained as producers for the upcoming reboot. According to Tolmach, the producers felt the core story of Spider-Man was that of a boy becoming a man, which could be depicted again in the reboot.

Tolmach, now president of Columbia Pictures, and Amy Pascal, co-chairman of Sony Pictures Entertainment, sought a director who could give sharp focus to Peter Parker's life. Kathryn Bigelow and David Fincher were considered for the job before Marc Webb was selected. Webb had recently made his directorial debut with 500 Days of Summer (2009). (Note: Attributed to multiple references:) Webb praised Raimi's version of the Spider-Man character and said it was a challenging precedent to follow. He did not want to tell another story with Raimi's version of the character, but instead wanted to present a new version of Spider-Man. (Note: Attributed to multiple references:) He later said that the world of The Amazing Spider-Man was influenced by the Ultimate Spider-Man comic series, but was also dreamed up by the filmmakers. The finalized screenplay was written by Vanderbilt and Sargent, with contributions from Steve Kloves and Paul Feig.

=== Casting ===
==== Peter Parker / Spider-Man ====
Before Andrew Garfield was cast as Spider-Man, other actors were considered for the role, including Michael Angarano, Drake Bell, Jamie Bell, Frank Dillane, Alden Ehrenreich, Josh Hutcherson, Aaron Johnson, Joe Jonas, Logan Lerman and Anton Yelchin. (Note: Attributed to multiple references:) On July 1, 2010, it was announced that the role would go to Garfield, who said he calmed his anxiety about getting the part by pretending he was auditioning for a Spider-Man short film made by his friends. The film's director, Marc Webb, said that Garfield brought humor, emotional weight and physicality to the role. Garfield and Emma Stone were screen-tested together, and Webb said there was instant chemistry between them; they began dating while shooting the film.

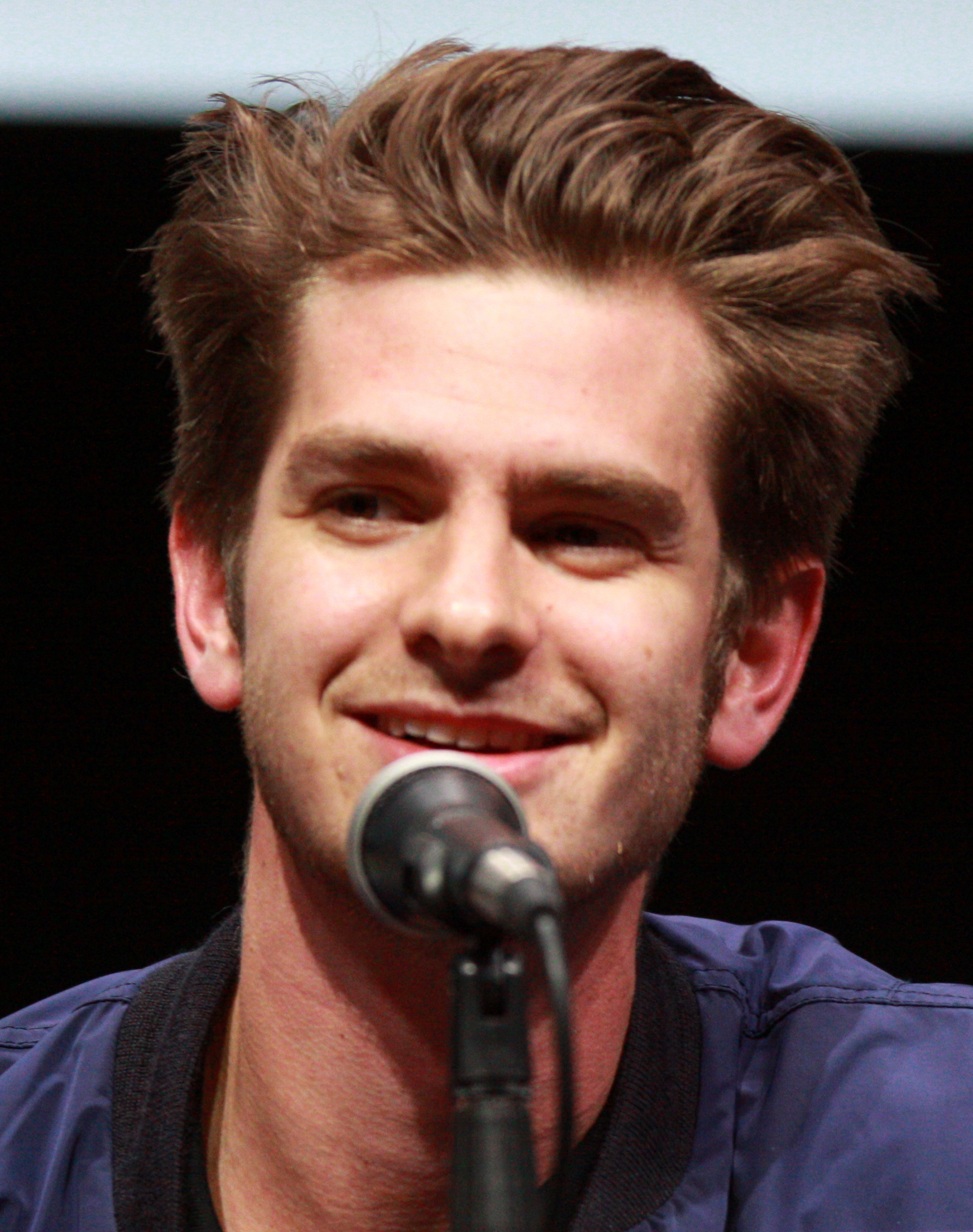
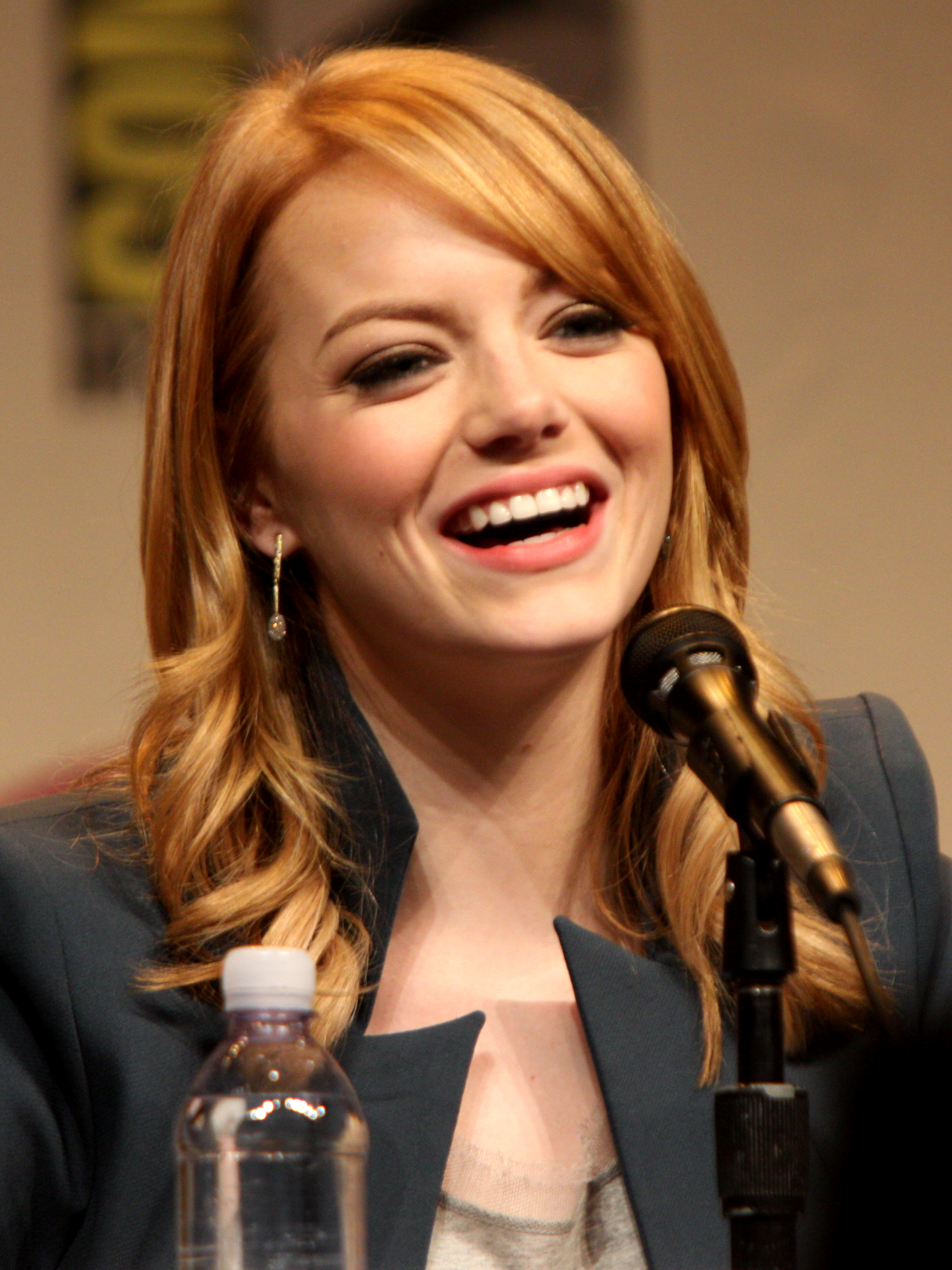
Andrew Garfield (left) and Emma Stone at San Diego Comic-Con in 2013

Garfield described Peter as someone he can relate to, and said the character had been an important influence on him since he was a young boy. (Note: Attributed to multiple references:) To prepare for the role, he studied the movements of both athletes and spiders, and incorporated spider-like movements into his performance of Peter, even when the character is not wearing his Spider-Man suit. Garfield practiced yoga and Pilates in order to be as flexible as possible. He said the physical training for the role was demanding and exhausting; he had three different stunt doubles during filming. Garfield admitted to shedding a tear when he first wore the Spider-Man costume, and that he tried to imagine a "better" actor in the suit, because seeing himself as Spider-Man did not make sense to him. He said the suit was uncomfortable and that he was not allowed to wear anything underneath except underwear, because it was skintight.

Webb described The Amazing Spider-Man as "a story about a kid who grows up looking for his father and finds himself." Both Webb and Garfield described Peter as an outsider, with Webb noting that in the early Spider-Man comics, his outsider status was defined by him being a nerdy "science whiz". Webb said that because the idea of "what a nerd is" has changed, and because "nerds" are now "running the world", a challenge of the film was how to define Peter's outsider status in a contemporary context. Garfield tried to capture how Peter "copes with the feelings of being an underdog, his confusions and his self-doubt" in an attempt to bring "a certain empathy and sensitivity to his character that explains how it helps him become the hero". He said that Peter goes through normal struggles that most people experience, and described him as "a very inspiring, aspirational character that symbolizes goodness—and how difficult it is to be good". Garfield called Peter's Spider-Man costume a "protective layer" which gives him a powerful anonymity, allowing him to become witty and "get away with anything." Garfield compared the costume to the anonymity of the Internet.

==== Gwen Stacy ====
In September 2010, it was reported that Sony was casting two female lead roles, leading to speculation that both Mary Jane Watson and Gwen Stacy would appear in the film. However, The Wrap reported in November that Mary Jane was never in the script. Candidates for the role of Gwen included Dianna Agron, Lily Collins, Georgina Haig, Ophelia Lovibond, Dominique McElligott, Imogen Poots and Mia Wasikowska. (Note: Attributed to multiple references:) By early October, Emma Stone had been chosen for the role, due in large part to her chemistry with Garfield. Stone was unfamiliar with the Spider-Man comics, and educated herself in preparation for the role. She described Gwen as "a daddy's girl" who is very responsible and protective of her family. She said Gwen offers Peter stability and "a family unit not marred with parental loss". (Note: Attributed to multiple references:) Stone said she wanted to interpret the character in her own way, but hoped her performance would please fans of the comics. (Note: Attributed to multiple references:)

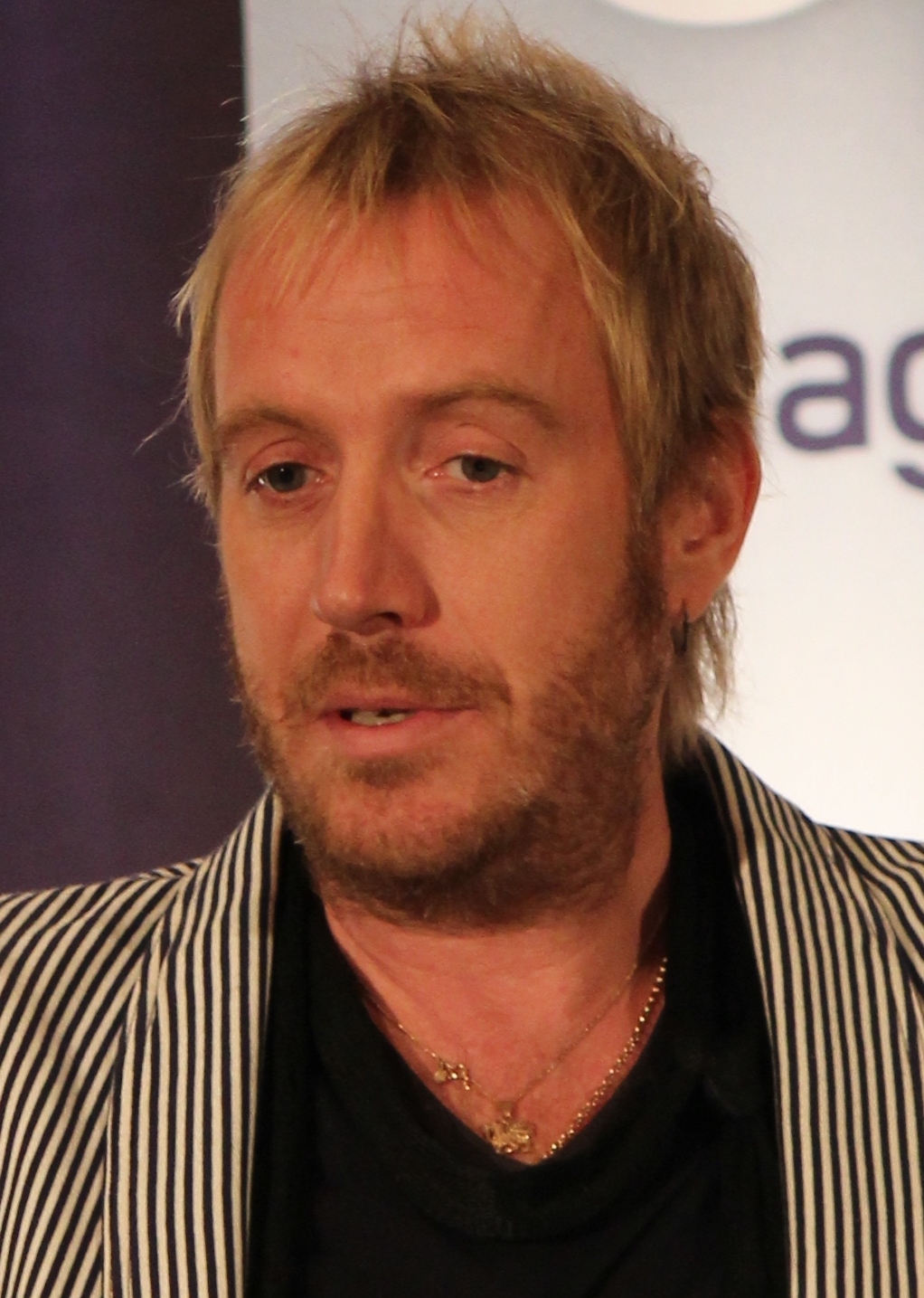
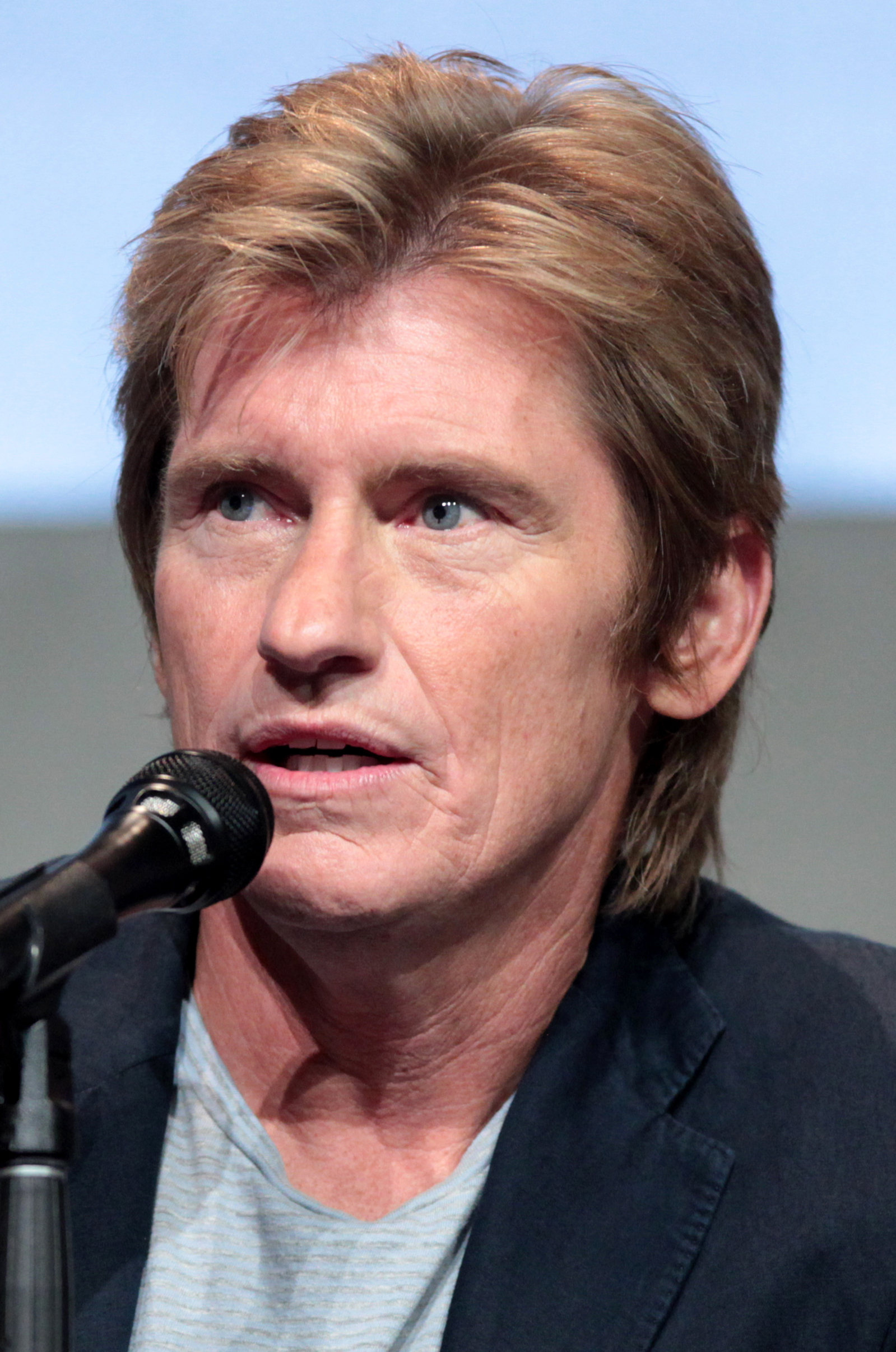
Rhys Ifans (left, pictured in 2011), and Denis Leary (in 2015)

==== Curt Connors / Lizard ====
By mid-October 2010, Rhys Ifans was confirmed for the role of Curt Connors / Lizard; Michael Fassbender was also considered for the role. (Note: Attributed to multiple references:) Webb has stated that Connors is not a traditional villain, while Ifans has claimed he does not qualify as a villain at all. Ifans described him as a flawed and "broken" man who attempts to help others and himself but makes a bad decision. (Note: Attributed to multiple references:) He compared Connors to Dr. Jekyll, and viewed his transformation into the Lizard as an experience of great euphoria and hubris, similar to that of a drug addict. When preparing for the role, Ifans purposely did not read many of the Spider-Man comics. When designing the Lizard, Webb chose not to give him a lizard snout, as he wanted him to appear human as well as monstrous, and be able to convey emotions.

==== Other characters ====
In November, Denis Leary accepted the role of George Stacy, and Martin Sheen was confirmed for the role of Uncle Ben. (Note: Attributed to multiple references:) Sheen described Ben as a surrogate father for Peter, and Webb praised Sheen for bringing a "benevolent authority" to the role. Webb sought to portray Ben as a blue-collar man, whose outlook on life was different from the science-inclined Peter. Webb found it interesting to explore the differences between Peter and his aunt and uncle.

Sally Field said she took the role of Aunt May as a favor to her friend Laura Ziskin, because she knew it would be Ziskin's last film (Ziskin died in 2011). Webb praised Field for bringing "genuine affection" to the role. Irrfan Khan said he was offered the role of Rajit Ratha (Note: At the time of his casting, The New York Times reported that Khan's character was named Van Adder.) after appearing in the television drama In Treatment. Webb was a fan of Khan after watching the series, along with Khan's films The Namesake and The Warrior. Khan said his sons were excited about the role and insisted he take it.

=== Design ===
Webb felt a responsibility to reinvent Spider-Man. One departure from the preceding trilogy was to have Spider-Man build artificial web-shooters, as he does in the comics. Webb explained that the web-shooters in The Amazing Spider-Man were meant to showcase Peter's intelligence. The crew also redesigned Spider-Man's costume for the film, in an attempt to make Peter's body appear "longer and more lithe, more of an acrobat, someone incredibly agile". Webb wanted it to be apparent that the costume and web-shooters were things that Peter constructed himself. The crew created multiple different Spider-Man suits for various lighting conditions.

=== Filming ===
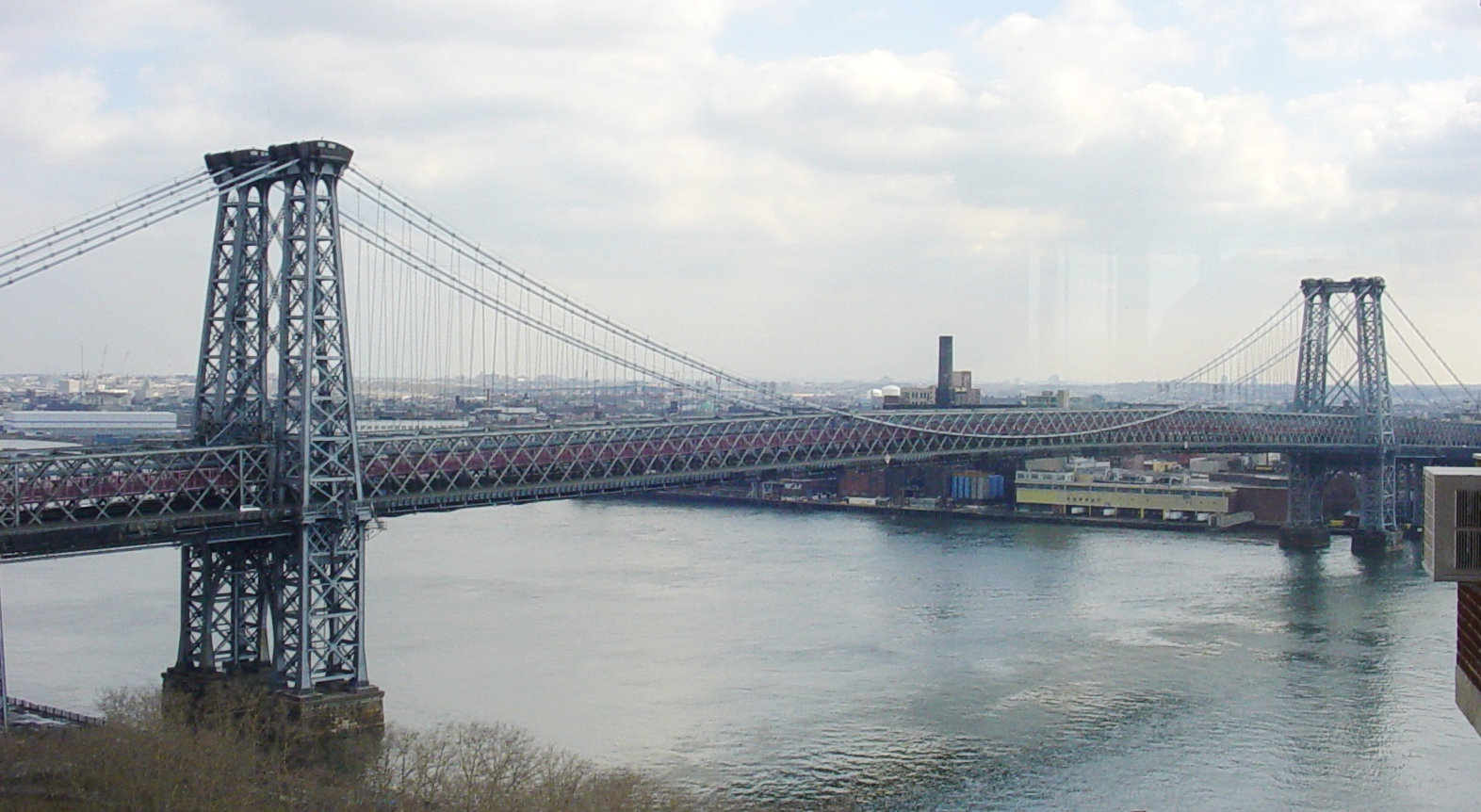
The scene in which the Lizard rampages on the Williamsburg Bridge was filmed both on the bridge itself and on a Los Angeles soundstage, where a 150-foot piece of the bridge was constructed.

Principal photography for The Amazing Spider-Man occurred in Los Angeles and New York City. Filming began on December 6, 2010. Locations in Los Angeles included the Henry Fonda Theater in Hollywood, the gym of St. John Bosco High School, Immanuel Presbyterian Church in Mid-Wilshire, and various locations around South Pasadena, San Pedro and Woodland Hills. In New York, the Alexander Hamilton U.S. Custom House served as the exterior for NYPD headquarters, while an apartment on Manhattan's Upper West Side was used as the exterior of the Stacy family home. A row of houses on Fuller Place in the Brooklyn neighborhood of Windsor Terrace stood in for the Forest Hills, Queens neighborhood of Ben and May Parker. A web-swinging stunt sequence was filmed along the Riverside Drive Viaduct in Harlem. Principal photography wrapped in May 2011, with reshoots taking place in New York that November and in Los Angeles in December. (Note: Attributed to multiple references:)

For action sequences involving Spider-Man, Webb relied more on stunt performers than previous Spider-Man films, which had used extensive CGI to create the character's superhuman movements. To determine how Spider-Man should look when swinging from his webs, stunt coordinator Andy Armstrong studied the movements of an Olympic gymnast. (Note: Attributed to multiple references:) Garfield performed many of his own stunts, which required him to undertake rigorous physical training and lessons in parkour. The crew spent months creating rigs that would allow Garfield and his stunt doubles to swing in a way that was not computer-generated. One rig on Riverside Drive in Harlem was hundreds of feet long, and allowed a man to swing through traffic.

Initially, a large stunt double was going to portray the 9-foot-tall Lizard, but Ifans insisted on playing the Lizard himself. He wore a motion capture suit, a cardboard head and a green sleeve over his right arm. The sleeve allowed his arm to be erased in post-production, which made Connors appear to be an amputee. The motion capture process allowed even small movements—like those of Ifans' eyes and eyebrows—to be recorded and integrated into the CGI-generated Lizard. (Note: Attributed to multiple references:)

The Amazing Spider-Man was the first Hollywood production to be filmed with the RED Epic camera, and was shot in 3D at 5K resolution. Cinematographer John Schwartzman said the RED cameras were crucial in achieving the type of 3D filmmaking that Webb envisioned, particularly when it came to moving the lightweight cameras on rigs for action sequences. One of the film's climactic scenes was filmed at a 1.9:1 aspect ratio to optimize it for IMAX viewing.

The "decay rate algorithm" featured in the film was inspired by the real-life Gompertz–Makeham law of mortality. The fight scene in the subway car was influenced by the physical comedy in the films of Charlie Chaplin and Buster Keaton. During the filming of one scene, Garfield nearly suffocated under his mask while he was submerged in water.

=== Visual effects ===
Initially, The Amazing Spider-Man was going to be filmed in 2D, then converted to 3D during post-production. However, with the help of the 3D technology company 3ality Technica, the decision was made at the last minute to shoot the film in 3D instead. (Note: Attributed to multiple references:) Sony Pictures Imageworks was responsible for a digital touch-up of the film.

=== Music ===
Webb wanted a musical score that blended grandeur with intimacy, and James Horner was enlisted for the task. (Note: Attributed to multiple references:) In a review of the score for AllMusic, James Christopher Monger said Horner's soundtrack lacks "the pulsating gravitas" of Danny Elfman's score for the 2002 film Spider-Man, but evokes similar feelings. He described the score as "[m]easured, quietly grand, and at times a little old-fashioned", and felt that it focuses more on the human relationships in the film than the action sequences. Christian Clemmensen of Filmtracks called the score "heroic when necessary but unexpectedly dramatic in its character-centric passages." He felt that the "heart" of the soundtrack is found in its piano sequences, which follow Peter's relationships "in their tender and mysterious turns". The film's soundtrack album was released under the Sony Classical label.

== Themes and inspirations ==
Rhys Ifans has compared Spider-Man's story to William Shakespeare's Hamlet on the grounds that it can be retold in many different ways. He observed that both works depict a young man grappling with the loss of his father, and that Spider-Man can be seen as a spokesman for every generation.

Both Marc Webb and producer Avi Arad have pointed out a thematic connection between Peter Parker and Curt Connors. They noted that Peter has no parents, while Connors has no right arm. Webb said the theme of The Amazing Spider-Man is "we all have a missing piece", and he said Peter uses his Spider-Man persona to fill the "void" created by the loss of his parents.

When developing The Amazing Spider-Man, Webb liked the idea of Oscorp being connected to everything in the story, including Peter's parents. He described Oscorp Tower as a sinister place with a mythological weight similar to the Tower of Babel.

== Marketing ==
=== Merchandising and partnerships ===
As part of the film's marketing campaign, various types of merchandise related to The Amazing Spider-Man was produced, including action figures, PEZ dispensers, Mega Bloks construction sets, trading cards and nail polish. (Note: Attributed to multiple references:) Partnerships were developed with corporate sponsors such as Twizzlers, the Kellogg Company and the Keebler Company. The fast-food restaurants Carl's Jr. and Hardee's offered a new burger, "The Amazing Grilled Cheese Bacon Burger", which was advertised through television and radio commercials featuring Spider-Man co-creator Stan Lee. (Note: Attributed to multiple references:) Sony launched an augmented reality mobile application for the film, while D-Box Technologies provided motion simulation for the film in select theaters. Within the film itself, product placement was used to advertise Sony mobile phones, tablets, monitors and laptops, as well as Microsoft's Bing search engine.

=== Viral campaign ===
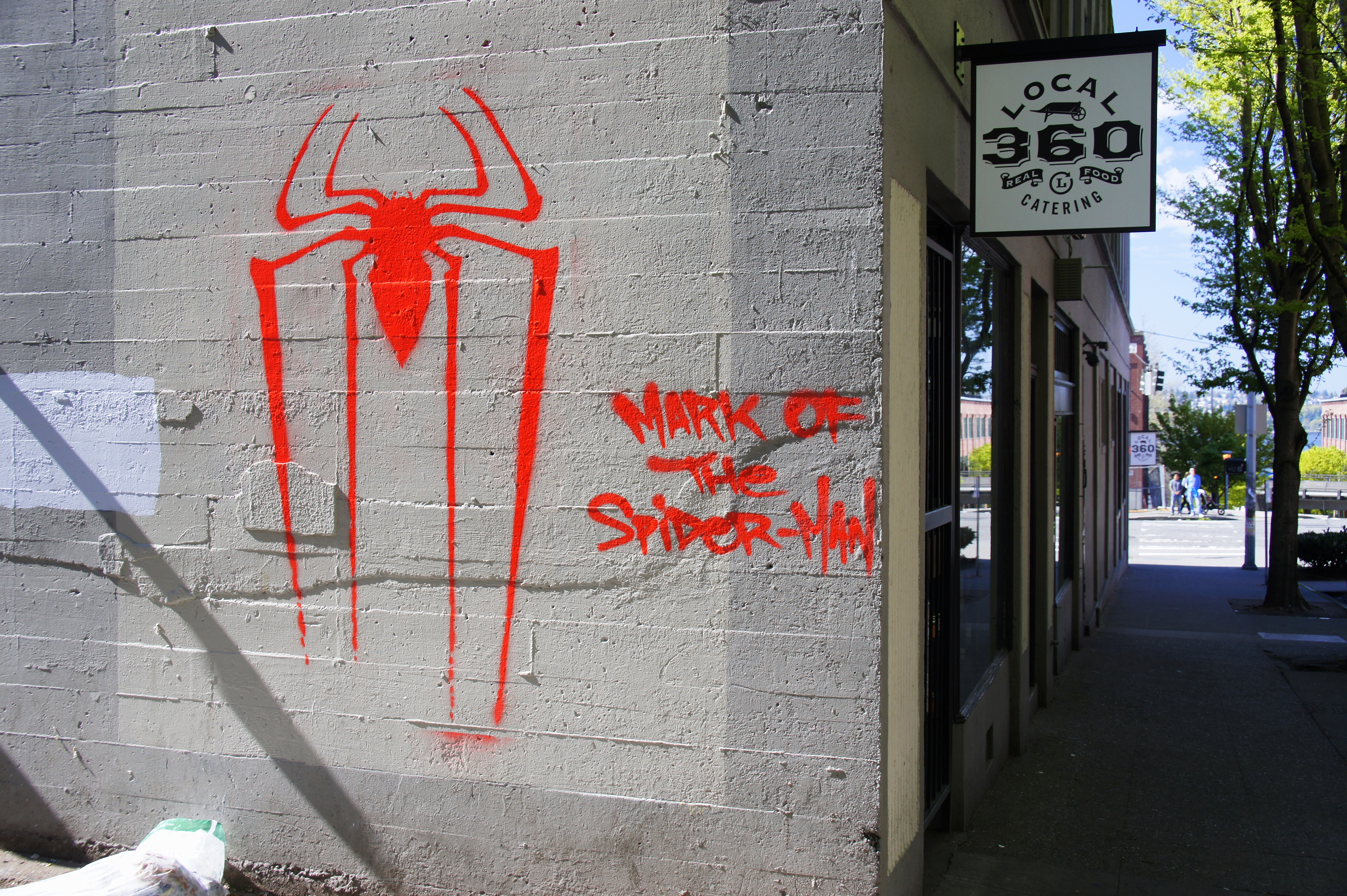
Graffiti of the Spider-Man logo (pictured here in Seattle, Washington) was part of the film's viral marketing campaign in several major US cities.

A viral marketing campaign for the film was launched in early 2012. On January 8, the Spider-Man logo appeared on some of the world's most iconic buildings, such as the Sydney Opera House, the Colosseum of Rome, the Kremlin in Moscow and the Arc de Triomphe in Paris. A "sneak-peek screening" of The Amazing Spider-Man was held on February 6 in 13 cities around the world. The same month, the film's official Twitter account posted longitude and latitude coordinates in major US cities, which led to comic book shops in Los Angeles, New York City, Atlanta, Denver, Seattle and Phoenix. Individuals who went on this scavenger hunt found a backpack at the location, ostensibly the property of Peter Parker. (Note: Attributed to multiple references:) Items in the backpacks revealed an online "countdown clock"—when the countdown was up, scavenger hunt participants were recruited to paint the Spider-Man logo as graffiti. (Note: Attributed to multiple references:) The viral website also offered clues to other websites, such as a photo blog that expressed Peter Parker's point of view, and a website with instructions on how to build a web-shooter. (Note: Attributed to multiple references:)

Emma Stone promoting The Amazing Spider-Man at San Diego Comic-Con in 2011

The marketing campaign also included websites for Oscorp and the Daily Bugle. The Bugle site featured George Stacy asking people to send in photos documenting the whereabouts of Spider-Man. (Note: Attributed to multiple references:) People who uploaded images of Spider-Man received a Spider-Man poster. (Note: Attributed to multiple references:) Through Twitter, locations were revealed that had packages containing Connors' shredded lab coat, an Oscorp identification badge and scientific samples of reptilian skin. Solving a puzzle led players to a new Oscorp website with an internship application. Completing the application and supplying the keyword "Mutagen" revealed a Lizard-themed featurette. (Note: Attributed to multiple references:) On June 1, 2012, a Carl's Jr. in Glendale, California, was decorated with webs and declared a "crime scene" due to Spider-Man's apprehension of a thief. Free promotional T-shirts, film passes and other prizes were distributed, and attendees were given another puzzle to solve. Silas Lesnick of SuperHeroHype described the film's viral campaign as "one of the most comprehensive film virals to date".

=== Philanthropy ===
Leading up to the release of The Amazing Spider-Man, Andrew Garfield became an ambassador for the organization Stand Up to Cancer, which sold T-shirts featuring Spider-Man as part of its fundraising. Garfield explained that "these shirts underscore the idea that anyone has the power to be a hero." He described cancer as "one of our greatest villains" and said was proud to join others "in standing up to this disease." Laura Ziskin, one of the film's producers, was a founder of Stand Up to Cancer and had died from breast cancer the previous year.

Another promotional campaign for the film was "Spider-Man Week" in New York City. Using the slogan "Be Amazing, Stand Up and Volunteer!", the campaign offered opportunities for people to be involved with various community projects, such as neighborhood beautification and CPR trainings. There were also activities featuring spiders and Spider-Man at the New York Botanical Garden, the Wildlife Conservation Society Zoos, Madame Tussauds New York, the Brooklyn Children's Museum and the Staten Island Children's Museum. To celebrate Spider-Man Week, the Empire State Building was lit in Spider-Man's characteristic colors of red and blue.

== Release ==
The Amazing Spider-Man had been scheduled for a July 3, 2012 worldwide release, but release dates outside North America were moved earlier to increase first-week sales. (Note: Attributed to multiple references:) The worldwide premiere of the film took place in Tokyo on Wednesday, June 13. In North America, the film earned $7.5 million during its midnight run at 3,150 locations, including $1.2 million from 300 IMAX venues. On its opening day, a Tuesday before the Fourth of July holiday, it set a Tuesday-gross record of $35 million, which would be surpassed in 2019 by Spider-Man: Far From Home with $39.3 million. (Note: Attributed to multiple references:) The next day, the film dropped 33.4 percent to $23.3 million—the second highest non-opening Wednesday at the time. Over the three-day weekend, it grossed $62 million, pushing its six-day gross to $137 million, which was smaller than the $180.07 million earned by Spider-Man 2 during its Fourth of July release in 2012. Nevertheless, Sony stated that in "the world of re-launched franchises, this is a spectacular success by any measure". The film remained number one at the box office for ten consecutive days, until the opening day of Ice Age: Continental Drift.

Outside North America, The Amazing Spider-Man grossed $51.1 million on its five-day opening weekend (June 27–July 1) from 13 markets, with strong openings in many Asian countries. In India, it earned $6.0 million, a record opening for a Hollywood film. Its total box office gross in India was $20 million, making it the eighth highest-grossing Hollywood film in India at the time. (Note: Attributed to multiple references:) Opening in an additional 61 markets, the film made $127.5 million during its second weekend, and was number one at the box office in over 30 countries. In Indonesia, it broke the opening-weekend record with $4.5 million; in the United Kingdom, it opened to £11.1 million ($18.1 million). In China, The Amazing Spider-Man grossed $33.3 million during its first week, more than the lifetime gross of Spider-Man 3 in that country. China was the film's highest-grossing territory outside of North America, with $48.8 million in total.

During its theatrical run, the film earned $262 million in North America and $495.9 million in other countries, for a worldwide total of $757.9 million. It was the seventh highest grossing film of 2012. (Note: Attributed to multiple references:) In March 2024, Sony announced that all of its live-action Spider-Man films would be re-released in theaters as part of Columbia Pictures' 100th anniversary celebration. The Amazing Spider-Man was re-released on May 6, 2024.

== Home media ==
The Amazing Spider-Man was released by Sony Pictures Home Entertainment on Blu-ray, Blu-ray 3D, DVD and digital download on November 9, 2012, in North America. These releases contain a 90-minute behind-the-scenes documentary, audio commentary from Marc Webb, Avi Arad and Matt Tolmach, deleted scenes and other special features. (Note: Attributed to multiple references:) Sony also released a limited edition gift set containing four discs along with figurines of Spider-Man and the Lizard. In October 2017, the film was included in "The Spider-Man Legacy Collection", which contains five Spider-Man films on 4K UHD Blu-Ray. In April 2021, Sony and Disney signed a deal to allow Sony's preceding Spider-Man films to stream on Hulu and Disney+ for viewers in the United States. The Amazing Spider-Man debuted on Disney+ on April 21, 2023.

== Reception ==
=== Critical response ===
On the review aggregator website Rotten Tomatoes, 71% of 339 critics' reviews are positive, with an average rating of 6.6/10. The website's consensus reads: "A well-chosen cast and sure-handed direction allows The Amazing Spider-Man to thrill despite revisiting many of the same plot points from 2002's Spider-Man." Metacritic, which uses a weighted average, assigns the film a score of 66 out of 100, based on 42 critics. Audiences polled by CinemaScore gave the film an "A−" on an A+ to F scale.

Boyd Van Hoeija of Variety described The Amazing Spider-Man as a "mostly slick, entertaining and emotionally involving recombination of fresh and familiar elements". Jordan Mintzer of The Hollywood Reporter felt the film was satisfying and had a stronger romance than Spider-Man (2002), and he praised the emotional and comedic touches that Webb provided. Writing in The Village Voice, Chris Pakham said the film was faithful to the comics and that Garfield's "spindly physicality evokes the Marvel illustrations of the 1960s." Conversely, Lou Lemenick of the New York Post wrote that the film was "a pointless rehash in the mode of Superman Returns." New Yorker critic Anthony Lane described The Amazing Spider-Man as not "amazing" and "running out of nimbleness and fun". Kenneth Turan of the Los Angeles Times called the film "memorable in pieces but not as a whole" and said the Lizard "is not quite an opponent for the ages." He felt the film's best element is the relationship between Peter and Gwen.

Lisa Schwarzbaum of Entertainment Weekly described the film as "friskier" and "sweeter-natured" than Raimi's Spider-Man films. She felt the story's intimate moments were more laudable than its spectacles. Claudia Puig of USA Today wrote that as a reboot, the film "stands on its own quite nicely, focusing more on human emotions than on a panoply of special effects." She said that Garfield's version of Spider-Man is "whip-smart and likably cheeky, with an undercurrent of teenage angst." Christy Lemire of the Associated Press described Garfield's Spider-Man as an arrogant and misunderstood outsider, which gives the film a "restless, reckless energy and a welcome sense of danger." However, Ty Burr of The Boston Globe felt the film was "dumbed down, tarted up" and "almost shockingly uninspired" compared to the Raimi films; he described it as the worst superhero film since Green Lantern. Colin Covert of the Star Tribune also felt that The Amazing Spider-Man was weaker than its predecessors and described it as "The Notebook in spandex". Roger Ebert of the Chicago Sun-Times felt that the reboot provided better reasons for why Peter adopts his superhero role. However, he said the Lizard was uninspired and had the dramatic range of Godzilla.

Joe Morgenstern of The Wall Street Journal and Dana Stevens of Slate magazine criticized the film's retelling of Spider-Man's origin story. However, Randy Myers from the San Jose Mercury News found it "strong, bold and well-acted", and felt it was the best Spider-Man film to date. Peter Travers of Rolling Stone wrote that the "unnecessary" reboot "pulled stellar performances from Garfield and Stone and touches the heart." Stephanie Zacharek of Movieline also praised the performances of Garfield and Stone. Tom Charity of CNN found Garfield's "combination of fresh-faced innocence, nervous agitation and wry humor ... immediately appealing." Mary F. Pols of Time said that even though the story was familiar, Garfield and Webb made it feel "convincingly fresh and exciting."

=== Award nominations ===
The Amazing Spider-Man did not win any awards, but received various nominations.

Award	Category	Nominees
Annie Awards	Best Animated Effects in a Live Action Production	Stephen Marshall, Joseph Pepper, Dustin Wicke
Annie Awards	Best Character Animation in a Live Action Production	Mike Beaulieu, Roger Vizard, Atushi Sato, Jackie Koehler, Derek Esparza, Richard Smith, Max Tyrie
Golden Trailer Awards	Best Motion/Title Graphics	"Domestic Trailer 2"
Kids' Choice Awards	Favorite Movie	The Amazing Spider-Man
Kids' Choice Awards	Favorite Movie Actor	Andrew Garfield
Kids' Choice Awards	Favorite Male Buttkicker	Andrew Garfield
Teen Choice Awards	Choice Summer Movie: Action	
Teen Choice Awards	Choice Movie: Villain	Rhys Ifans
Teen Choice Awards	Choice Summer Movie Star: Male	Andrew Garfield
Teen Choice Awards	Choice Summer Movie Star: Female	Emma Stone
People's Choice Awards	Favorite Movie	
People's Choice Awards	Favorite Action Movie	
People's Choice Awards	Favorite Movie Franchise	
People's Choice Awards	Favorite Movie Actress	Emma Stone
People's Choice Awards	Favorite Movie Superhero	Andrew Garfield as Spider-Man
People's Choice Awards	Favorite On-Screen Chemistry	Andrew Garfield and Emma Stone
People's Choice Awards	Favorite Face of Heroism	Emma Stone
Saturn Awards	Best Fantasy Film	
Screen Actors Guild Awards	Outstanding Performance by a Stunt Ensemble in a Motion Picture	
Visual Effects Society Awards	Outstanding Virtual Cinematography in a Live Action Feature Motion Picture	Rob Engle, David Schaub, Cosku Turhan, Max Tyrie

== Post-release ==
=== Additional films ===
The Amazing Spider-Man was originally meant to be the first in a series of at least three films. Leading up to the 2014 release of the first sequel, The Amazing Spider-Man 2, Sony announced that two additional sequels would follow. However, further films in the series were eventually cancelled. In February 2015, Sony Pictures and Marvel Studios announced that Spider-Man would appear in the Marvel Cinematic Universe (MCU). The MCU film Spider-Man: No Way Home (2021) follows Peter (played by Tom Holland) as he encounters alternate versions of himself and villains from parallel universes. Andrew Garfield and Rhys Ifans appear in the film in their respective roles of Peter and Connors from The Amazing Spider-Man series.

=== Video games ===
A video game titled The Amazing Spider-Man was developed by Beenox, which had developed the previous two Spider-Man games, Spider-Man: Shattered Dimensions and Spider-Man: Edge of Time. The Amazing Spider-Man was released on June 26, 2012 for Xbox 360, PlayStation 3, Nintendo Wii, Nintendo DS, Nintendo 3DS and personal computer. (Note: Attributed to multiple references:) The plot of the game takes place after the events of the film. In addition, Sony and Gameloft created a mobile game related to the film, and Sky Betting and Gaming's online casino website Sky Vegas released a related casino game.

=== Comic ===
In June 2012, a two-part comic titled The Amazing Spider-Man: The Movie #1–2 was released. It is written by Tom Cohen and illustrated by Neil Edwards. A week before the film's release, a trade paperback titled The Amazing Spider-Man: The Movie Prelude was published. It contains the two-part comic, as well as The Amazing Spider-Man issues #75–77.

== See also ==
- Spider-Man in film
