= Peter Anderson (cinematographer) =

American cinematographer (born 1942)

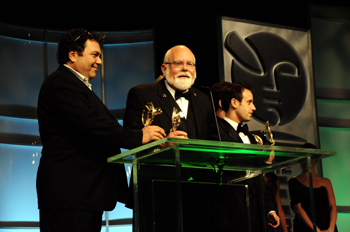
- Peter Anderson (center) at the 2009 7th Visual Effects Society Awards, accepting the award for Outstanding Visual Effects in a Special Venue Project for the 2008 concert film U2 3D
- Born: June 18, 1942 (age 84); Eau Claire, Wisconsin
- Education: University of Wisconsin–Eau Claire; ArtCenter College of Design
- Occupations: cinematographer; visual effects supervisor
- Parent(s): William and Leah Anderson

Peter William Anderson (born June 18, 1942) is a cinematographer, visual effects supervisor, and expert on specialized imaging technologies. He helped to develop many of these technologies, including modern 3D, motion control, large format, digital cinema, high frame rate, and high dynamic range.

Anderson was born in Eau Claire, Wisconsin, to William and Leah Anderson, both public school educators, as was his sister Susan, who taught English and French to high school students. He attended the University of Wisconsin–Eau Claire for two years in the early 1960s and continued his education in California, graduating from the ArtCenter College of Design in 1967. That year he founded his own company, specializing in film special effects and advertising photography. Which three years he sold to Macy's Department Stores. By 1978 his credits included the films Close Encounters of the Third Kind, The China Syndrome, Mahogany and Metamorphoses, and television projects including "Buck Rogers", Battlestar Gallactica and the opening titles for the NBC-TV series Ellery Queen. Anderson presented a public talk about his work when he was invited to return to UW-Eau Claire as grand marshal of the Homecoming 1978 celebration.

Anderson was the staff director of photography at Walt Disney Studios, and he has also headed the visual-effects facilities for Walt Disney Studios and Universal Studios.

Anderson was instrumental in the creation and filming of the 3-D theme-park attractions Magic Journeys (1982–1993), Captain EO (1986–1998), Muppet*Vision 3D (1991–2025), T2 3-D: Battle Across Time (1996–2020) and King Kong: 360 3-D (2010). He has also supervised IMAX 3-D productions including Cirque du Soleil: Journey of Man (2000) and Wild Ocean (2008), and contributed filming and visual effects to an array of projects, including the features U2 3D and Tron and the original incarnations of the television series Buck Rogers, Battlestar Galactica and Cosmos.

In 2014, Anderson received the Gordon E. Sawyer Award from the Academy of Motion Picture Arts and Sciences, a special Oscar awarded to "an individual in the motion picture industry whose technological contributions have brought credit to the industry."
