= U2 3D =

2008 3D concert film with U2

- Theatrical release poster
- Directed by: Catherine Owens; Mark Pellington
- Produced by: Jon Shapiro; Peter Shapiro; John Modell; Catherine Owens
- Starring: Bono; The Edge; Adam Clayton; Larry Mullen Jr.
- Cinematography: Peter Anderson; Tom Krueger
- Edited by: Olivier Wicki
- Music by: U2
- Production company: 3ality Digital
- Distributed by: National Geographic Entertainment
- Release dates: January 19, 2008 (Sundance Film Festival); January 23, 2008 (United States, Canada); February 22, 2008 (international)
- Running time: 85 minutes
- Country: United States
- Language: English
- Budget: $15 million
- Box office: $26.2 million

U2 3D is a 2008 American-produced concert film featuring rock band U2 performing during the Vertigo Tour in 2006. Directed by Catherine Owens and Mark Pellington, the film contains performances of 14 songs, including tracks from How to Dismantle an Atomic Bomb (2004), the album that the tour supported. The concert footage includes political and social statements made during the shows. It is the band's second feature film, following their 1988 rockumentary Rattle and Hum. Among several cinematic firsts, U2 3D was the first live-action digital 3D film.

The project was created to experiment with a new type of 3D film technology pioneered by Peter Anderson and producer Steve Schklair. After considering shooting American football games in 3D, Schklair's company 3ality Digital decided to create a concert film with U2. The band was hesitant to participate, but agreed to the project mainly as a technological experiment rather than a profit-making venture. Although set in Buenos Aires, U2 3D was shot at seven concerts across Latin America, and two in Australia. The film's complex setup involved shooting with up to 18 3D cameras simultaneously and capturing the footage digitally.

After a preview screening at the 2007 Cannes Film Festival, U2 3D premiered at the 2008 Sundance Film Festival and had its limited theatrical release in late January 2008, followed by its wide release the following month. The film was distributed by National Geographic Entertainment and was only released in IMAX 3D and digital 3D theaters. It peaked at number 19 at the United States box office, and earned over $26 million worldwide, ranking as one of the highest-grossing concert films. It received widely positive reviews, with critics praising the 3D technology and innovation. U2 3D won several awards, and its reception convinced some of the creators that the project marked a paradigm shift in filmmaking.

== Synopsis ==
U2 3D depicts a U2 concert in Buenos Aires during the band's Vertigo Tour. In the beginning of the film, a voice is heard chanting "everyone" in a crowd-filled stadium, followed by fans running through the venue. U2 begin the concert with "Vertigo", followed by ten more songs in the main set. Images are shown throughout the concert on the stage's LED display. Political and social statements are made during some songs, including "Sunday Bloody Sunday", during which the word "coexista" is spelled out on-screen through various religious symbols, and "Miss Sarajevo", where an excerpt from the U.N. Declaration of Human Rights is read aloud by a narrator. The main set ends with "One", after which the group leave the stage. They return for an encore and perform "The Fly", during which a succession of words and phrases appear on the stage's LED display and are superimposed into the film. U2 end the show with "With or Without You" and leave the stage for the final time. As the closing credits begin, a live performance of "Yahweh" is heard as animations from the stage's LED display are shown. U2 reappear on stage in a mid-credits scene performing the end of the song.

== Production ==
=== Background ===
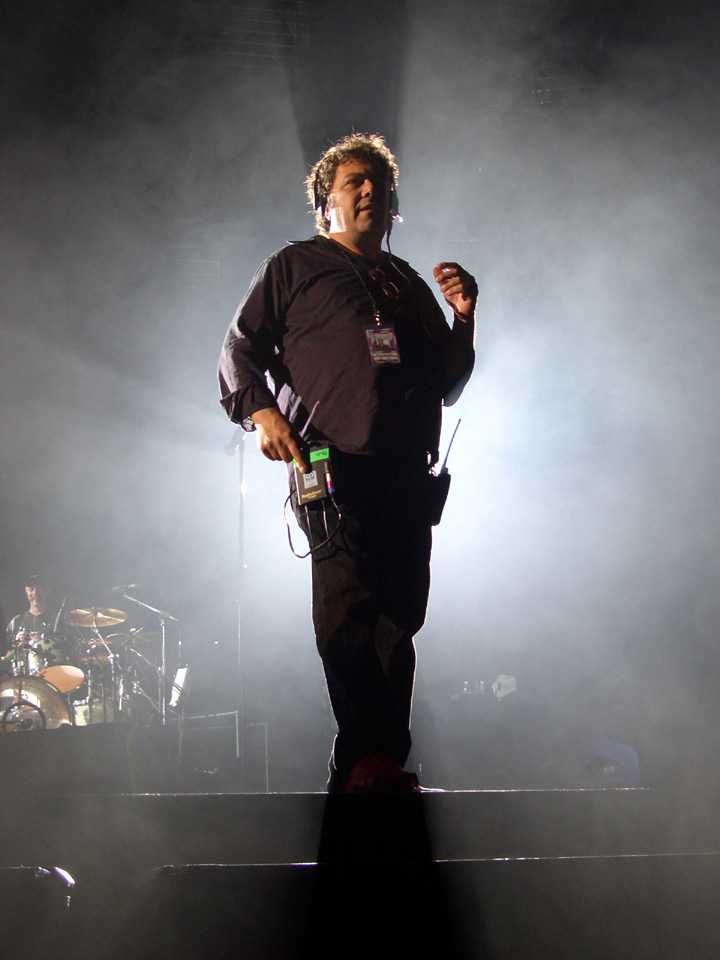
Producer Steve Schklair, pictured during filming, pioneered the 3D technology used in production of U2 3D.

In 2001, producers Jon and Peter Shapiro created a 2D IMAX concert film titled All Access, which featured live performances of several musicians. Due to the difficulty of using conventional IMAX film stock that had to be replaced every three minutes of shooting, the Shapiros wanted to use digital technology for their next project, which could easily be upscaled to the IMAX format without loss of quality. Noting how 3D films out-performed 2D films, they also wanted their next project to be in the IMAX 3D format. While looking for a new digital 3D technology medium, the Shapiros met producer Steve Schklair, founder of Cobalt Entertainment in 2000. Schklair had recently developed a digital 3D filming technique known as "active depth cut", which allowed for smooth cuts between shots that would normally not line up when filmed in 3D. This was done using motion control photography and real-time image processing to create a realistic 3D experience without subjecting the viewer to excessive motion sickness or eye strain. It was intended to be an inexpensive and effective way to shoot live events such as concerts or sports. With the help of John and David Modell, former owners of the Baltimore Ravens American football team, the digital 3D technology was tested at several National Football League (NFL) games in the 2003 season, including Super Bowl XXXVIII. Cobalt showed the footage to the NFL, hoping to create an NFL-based 3D IMAX film. While waiting for a response, the Shapiros proposed the idea of creating a 3D concert film for IMAX theaters. Although All Access had showcased several artists, the Shapiros now wanted to focus on a single act, and being U2 fans, suggested the band as a potential subject. Schklair felt U2 would be a good choice for the film due to their large concert setups and their constant movement while performing, both of which would provide good depth of field for 3D effects.

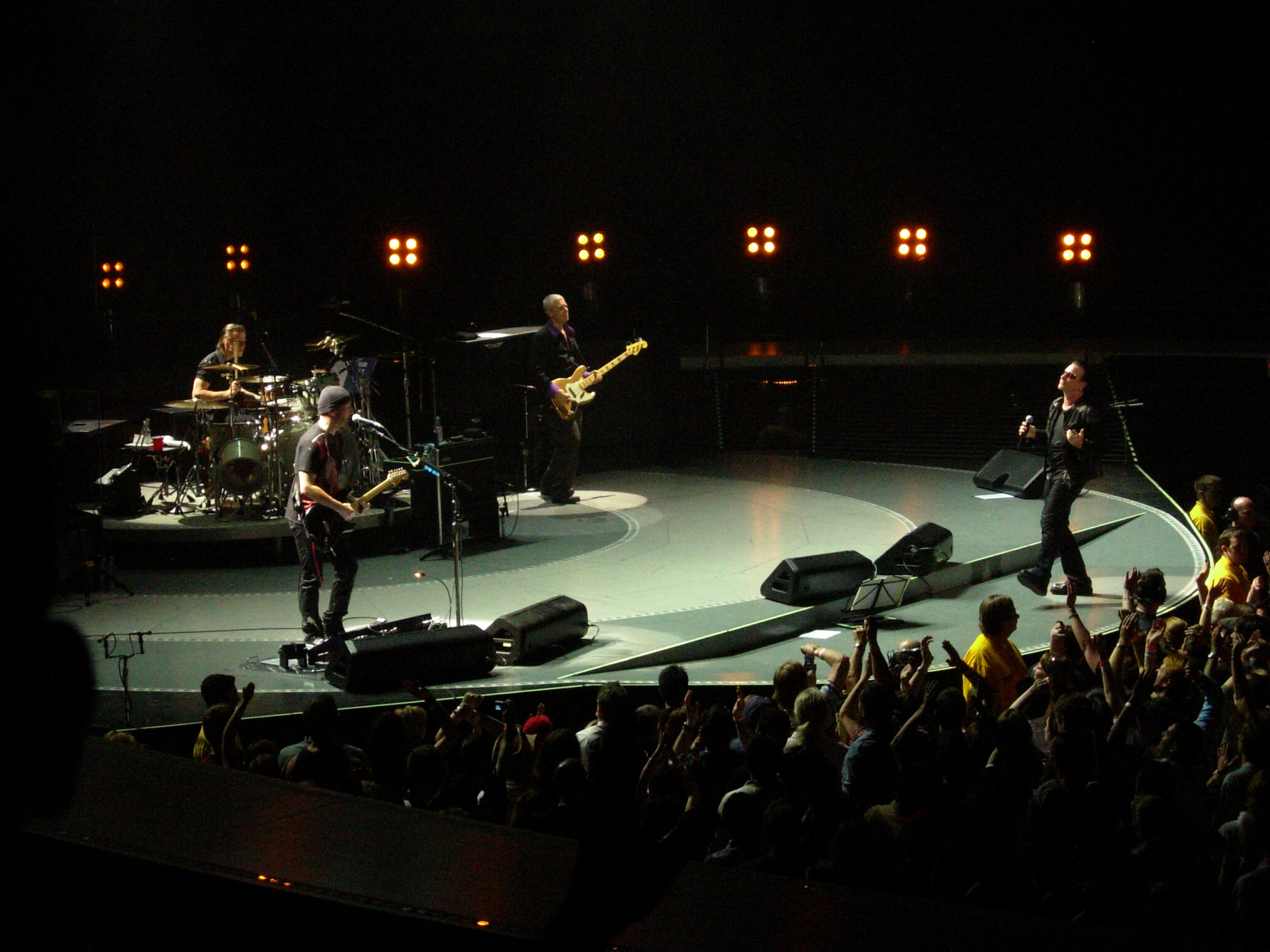
Test footage for the film was recorded at a Vertigo Tour concert in Anaheim, California.

The Modells' collaboration with U2 for the film was facilitated by their involvement with the band in researching LED display technology in 1997 for use at Ravens Stadium at Camden Yards. At the time, the only giant LED display in existence was being used by U2 on their PopMart Tour. To learn about the technology, John Modell toured with U2 on-and-off for a period of six months. During that time, he befriended Catherine Owens, who served as the group's art director since their 1992 Zoo TV Tour.

Unable to contact U2 manager Paul McGuinness, Peter Shapiro instead proposed the idea to Owens. The latter was researching art content for the upcoming Vertigo Tour and thought the concept could be used to show 3D video as part of U2's concerts. Shapiro explained that the technology was not that developed and simply wanted to document the tour itself in 3D, but Owens was not interested in making a film of the band, fearing it would interfere with the tour, so she declined the offer. After Shapiro showed Owens the 3D footage of the NFL games, Owens expressed interest in directing the proposed film, despite having no previous experience. According to bassist Adam Clayton, U2 were not interested in making another concert film, but Owens "pushed it down [their] throats". Once the band viewed the test shots, frontman Bono expressed interest in the project and convinced his bandmates to commit. Since U2 had already experimented with video technology in the past, they were interested in the project as a technological experiment rather than a means to make profit, and as a means to share the live experience with fans who could not afford concert tickets.

Pre-production for U2 3D officially started in early 2004, and the production was handled by 3ality Digital, a company formed from Schklair's Colbalt Entertainment and his partnership with the Modells and the Shapiros. Midway through the year, Bono agreed to let the 3ality Digital crew record test footage, which was accomplished using a single 3D camera at one of U2's Vertigo Tour concerts in Anaheim, California in March 2005. U2 were dissatisfied with their 1988 rockumentary feature film, Rattle and Hum, which mixed backstage footage and interviews with concert performances. The filmmakers decided that U2 3D would only have concert footage. The producers originally wanted to shoot in Los Angeles where all the filming equipment was located, but Owens and the band decided they needed a more enthusiastic audience. U2 ultimately chose to film in five cities in Latin America from February to March 2006, believing their absence from the region for eight years would foster an energetic atmosphere. The only one of the eight Latin American shows that was not shot was the first in Monterrey, Mexico. The project enabled U2 to share the outdoor stadium concerts with audiences in the US, where the band only performed at indoor arenas on the Vertigo Tour.

=== Filming ===
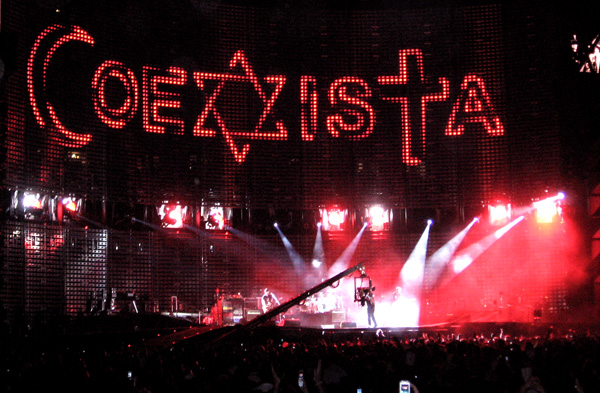
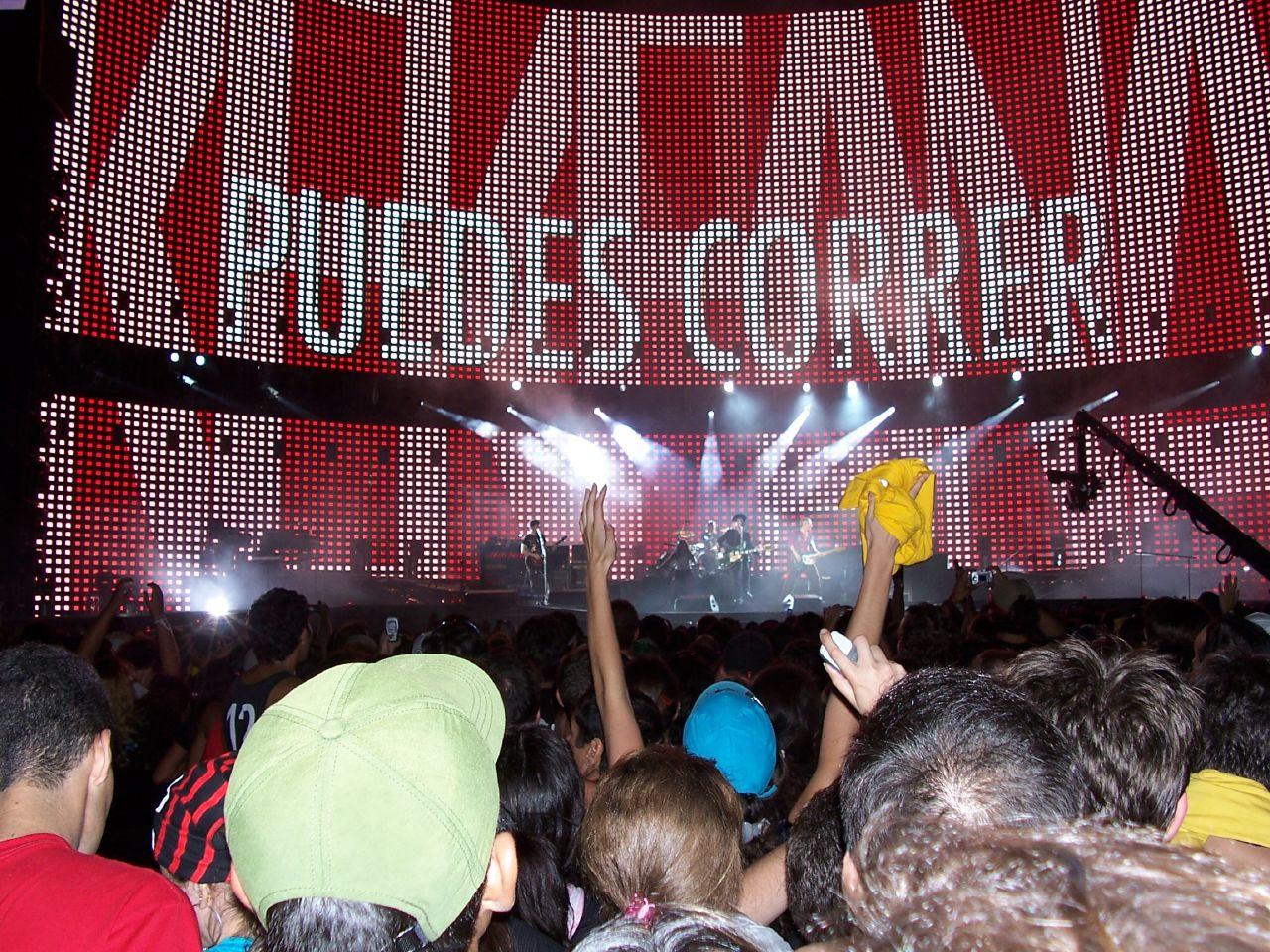
Filming began with two concerts in Mexico City, Mexico (left), followed by two additional shows in São Paulo, Brazil (right).

U2 3D's production featured the first 3D multiple-camera setup and was shot using every digital 3D camera and recording deck in existence. The crew had two days to set up the filming equipment before each concert, which required running fiber-optic cables and hooking up an electrical generator to supply power at each venue. The filming equipment consisted of nine custom-built 3D rigs. The project's large scale prompted 3ality Digital to work with director James Cameron—their chief competitor at the time. 3ality used their own 3flex TS1 camera rigs for filming, in addition to five Fusion 3D rigs, designed by Cameron and camera operator Vincent Pace. A total of 18 Sony CineAlta HDC-F950 cameras were used for filming, with two cameras on each rig. The cameras were fitted with Zeiss digital zoom lenses, making U2 3D the first 3D film shot using a zoom lens. One of the Fusion 3D camera rigs was used as a Spydercam and became the first 3D aerial camera. The cameras on each rig were spaced eye-distance apart to create a 3D effect in post-production. Using a beam splitter mounted to the camera rig, one camera shot through a 50/50 mirror, while the other shot the image reflected from that mirror. Each rig weighed an average of 250 pounds (110 kg). All of the concert footage was shot with twin-camera rigs, except for the two Melbourne shoots, where a single CineAlta camera with a Steadicam was also used to capture close-ups. The cameras captured high-definition video onto HDCAM SR recording decks, which enabled the crew to capture an entire concert.

Five crew members were required to work on each rig simultaneously to ensure that the focus on both cameras were synchronized. After one camera was destroyed when a concert security guard tossed buckets of water onto the audience, the crew waterproofed the remaining cameras. Due to Owens' limited directing experience prior to production, some of the filming in South America was directed by Mark Pellington, who previously worked with U2 on the "One" music video. Pellington was not involved in post-production, leaving Owens responsible for the remaining aspects of the project, including creative direction and editing.

Filmed concerts
No.	Date	Location	Venue
1	February 15, 2006	Mexico City, Mexico	Estadio Azteca
2	February 16, 2006	Mexico City, Mexico	Estadio Azteca
3	February 20, 2006	São Paulo, Brazil	Estádio do Morumbi
4	February 21, 2006	São Paulo, Brazil	Estádio do Morumbi
5	February 26, 2006	Santiago, Chile	Estadio Nacional de Chile
6	March 1, 2006	Buenos Aires, Argentina	River Plate Stadium
7	March 2, 2006	Buenos Aires, Argentina	River Plate Stadium
8	November 18, 2006	Melbourne, Australia	Telstra Dome
9	November 19, 2006	Melbourne, Australia	Telstra Dome

The concerts were filmed in a style which Owens described as "very unorthodox"; no storyboards or shooting scripts were used to ensure footage of U2's performances was improvised. Instead of being directed, U2 performed each of their concerts as usual, with the filming crew capturing footage in real time for the full 2 1/2-hour concerts. The shoots were planned such that the band's performance and the audience's view was uninterrupted. To avoid capturing other camera rigs in the footage, the crew would either film from the back of the stage, or alternate each night between shooting left-to-right and right-to-left. Several shows were edited together to create one performance; therefore, U2 were required to wear the same clothes every night to maintain continuity. Additional spotlights were focused on the audience during filming, and the lighting was dimmed on the stage's LED display. 110 microphones were used to record the concert audio, which included microphones placed on the main stage and around the two B-stages to record the band, and microphones placed throughout the venue to record the audience.

Principal photography began in February 2006, under the supervision of the 3D cinematographer Peter Anderson; two shows were filmed in Mexico City with two camera rigs to capture medium shots during a practice run for the crew to learn the choreography of U2's performances. The crew captured additional medium shots using one camera rig at the two São Paulo concerts, and captured overhead footage of drummer Larry Mullen Jr. using one camera rig at the show in Santiago. During preparations for the Buenos Aires concerts, U2 performed a 10-song set without an audience, so that the crew could capture close-up footage using a wide-angle lens; doing so in-concert would have interfered with the show. Owens dubbed the session the "phantom shoot". During the Buenos Aires shows, all nine camera rigs were used, capturing medium and long shots of U2 and their audience from the B-stages. The Buenos Aires shoot was the largest of the project, requiring a crew of 140 people.

In March 2006, the remaining Vertigo Tour concerts were postponed when the daughter of guitarist The Edge fell ill. During the interim, footage from the seven filmed shows was edited together, prompting the crew to request additional wide shots from the back of the stadium and close-ups of the band members. When the tour was on its fifth leg in November 2006, an additional two shows were filmed in Melbourne to capture pick-up footage. At the time, the songs appearing in the final cut of the film had already been selected and therefore only specific songs from the concerts were filmed.

=== Editing ===
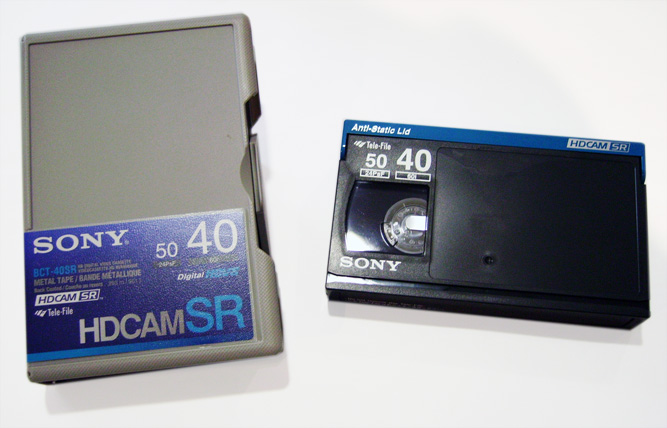
HDCAM SR tapes captured the footage which was later uploaded to computers for editing.

Post-production on U2 3D was led by editor Olivier Wicki who worked closely with Owens throughout the process; the two had previously collaborated on the "Original of the Species" music video. Editing began in May 2006 and was completed in January 2008. Over 100 hours of footage were filmed, featuring performances of 26 different songs. U2 were very involved in post-production, and helped with the final approval of each shot and performance used in the final cut. To appeal to a mainstream audience, 14 tracks were chosen for the film, including 12 of U2's singles and two non-singles from How to Dismantle an Atomic Bomb, the album that the Vertigo Tour supported. When selecting songs for the project, the crew had to ensure that the performances of each track fit with one another. U2 wanted to include "Mysterious Ways" and "Until the End of the World", but they were left out since Owens felt that those songs were out of place with the rest of the film; other songs were left out of the film because the band was unsatisfied with their own performance. Owens stated that the main focus of the film was based upon U2's relationship with one another and with their audience, and the challenge of selecting the songs was to create a narrative within the band's performance. Although "City of Blinding Lights" opened most shows on the tour, "Vertigo" was selected as the opening song of U2 3D. Other tracks that were performed at most of the filmed concerts that did not make the final cut include "Elevation", "I Still Haven't Found What I'm Looking For", "Original of the Species", and "Zoo Station". "With or Without You" was chosen as the last song before the closing credits, although it closed only one concert on the tour.

After the songs were selected, the footage was edited in 2D for eight months in New York City. Video post-production continued in Burbank, California at 3ality Digital's 3D production facility, which opened prior to the completion of shooting. Wicki worked with 3ality Digital to create the 3D and computer-generated effects. Footage from the nine filmed concerts, mostly from the Buenos Aires shows, was edited together with the footage from the "phantom shoot". Although the Mexico City shows were practice runs, footage from those concerts was used, including a scene where Bono reaches out to the camera during "Sunday Bloody Sunday". Because the crew felt the Melbourne audience lacked the energy of the Latin America crowds, most of the footage from the Melbourne concerts was not used except for some close-ups of Mullen.

Creating the 3D effect involved taking the edited 2D footage for the right eye and matching it up with footage for the left eye. Editing the Melbourne footage that used only a single camera involved a separate process to create 3D effects, known as "virtual second eye perspective". Several software programs were used to convert footage from 2D to 3D. The primary editing software, 3action, was developed at 3ality Digital during principal photography. It allowed the post-production team to change convergence points in each shot, and to create multiple convergence points. Left-eye and right-eye footage was assembled on separate layers, then edited together with color grading added, and eventually output in a 3D stereoscopic format for review.

A 2D screenshot from U2's performance of "One" shows how compositing was used to create layers during transitions between shots. U2 3D was the first 3D film to feature composite images with more than two layers.

U2 developed a style of editing in their previous concert films that involved fast cutting between shots, which Owens wanted to retain in U2 3D. Because fast cutting in 3D would lead to motion sickness or eye strain, the film was edited to incorporate dissolves of at least four frames between shots. Many of the transitions were created by layering several frames of footage on top of one another into composite images. Each of the layered frames featured a different depth of field to enhance the 3D effects, and up to five images were layered together in a single shot. This made U2 3D the first 3D film to feature composite images with more than two layers, and the first to be edited specifically to prevent the viewer from experiencing motion sickness or eye strain. Software did not exist at the time to layer the 3D images, so new software had to be developed. Because the project was captured in high-definition video, each frame used nearly 20 megabytes of data on 3ality Digital's servers, and the entire film used almost a petabyte (10^{15} bytes). The 3D editing process took longer than Owens expected, and consequently, the project went over budget, costing $15 million to produce. Editing was completed only "a couple weeks" before the premiere, and the final film was cut to a length of 85 minutes—seven shorter than originally announced.

Audio editor Carl Glanville worked on the soundtrack, mixing the audio into a 5.1 surround sound mix with audio engineer Robbie Adams in New York City. Video footage was compiled into files by Wicki, which were given to Glanville for compiling the soundtrack. Glanville and Adams said the audio editing was difficult mainly because the selection of video footage was limited, as only one to two cameras angles were captured at most of the shows. Further, the lyrics and music from the song performances differed slightly each night. To avoid lip sync and instrumental sync issues, the editors had to use the exact audio that was recorded during each shot. Mixing the vocals required that Glanville layer the audio recorded from the stage microphones with that from the audience microphones and to add a short delay between the two to compensate for any echos or delay that occurred in the venue. The sound from the subwoofer channel was mixed inside two IMAX theaters in Los Angeles to ensure the volume of low-end frequencies was consistent with the rest of the soundtrack. The edited video footage featured 10- to 20-second-long shots, in contrast to the shorter shots usually found in concert films. Extended gaps were added between songs to slightly slow down the pace of the film. All audio and video footage used was recorded live in concert, with no added overdubs. Following post-production, U2 3D became the first live-action film to be shot, posted, and exhibited entirely in 3D, the first live-action digital 3D film, and the first 3D concert film.

== Distribution ==
=== Marketing ===
The film's logo features the title in a stencil-like font, and was designed by creative director John Leamy.

The trailer for the film was released and first screened at the ShoWest trade show in March 2007, along with footage of "Sunday Bloody Sunday". Clips from the "Vertigo" and "The Fly" performances were featured in the trailer, which was edited by creative director John Leamy, who also designed the logo and title sequence for U2 3D. The film poster, which features a collage of images from the film, won Leamy an award for best poster art at the Giant Screen Cinema Association's annual international conference in 2008. The trailer was shown in 3D theaters before Meet the Robinsons, the only 3D film released in theaters in early 2007.

In October 2007, National Geographic Cinema Ventures (NGCV), the entertainment division of the National Geographic Society, announced that U2 3D would be the division's first major international release. Two days after the announcement, NGCV was combined into the newly created National Geographic Entertainment, a new unit within the society featuring various entertainment divisions. National Geographic CEO John M. Fahey Jr. stated that U2 3D was chosen as the new unit's first release because they felt that U2 is "a band of the world" and "world music is something the Geographic as an institution is really interested in". National Geographic chose Best Buy as the film's American sponsor, and offered passes to select members of the retailer's loyalty program to view U2 3D before its wide release. U2 3D was promoted through the internet, print, radio, television, on a JumboTron in Times Square, and as a sponsor on NASCAR's #19 Best Buy Dodge stock car driven by Elliott Sadler.

=== Initial screenings ===
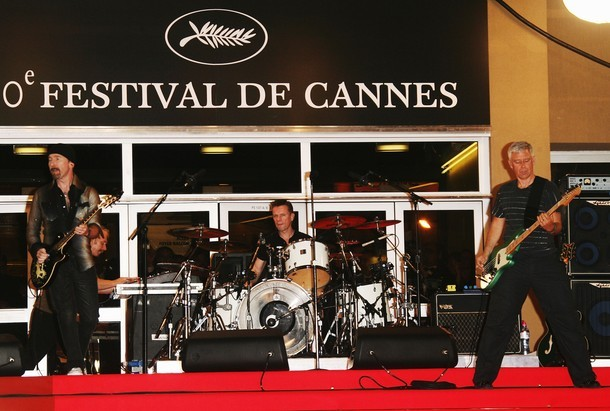
U2 performed a brief set at the 2007 Cannes Film Festival prior to the film's preview screening.

U2 were committed to preserving the film's 3D format and decided to only release it in digital 3D. To help promote this film format, a preview of U2 3D was screened at the 2007 Cannes Film Festival on May 19. It was one of nine films to be screened out-of-competition at the 2007 festival, and was the first live-action 3D film ever screened at Cannes. Following a brief song performance by U2 at the festival, the film was screened at midnight inside the Palais des Festivals et des Congrès. At the time, the 3D post-production process was incomplete; therefore the preview was only 56 minutes long, featuring nine songs.

Originally scheduled for the third quarter of 2007, the completed version of U2 3D premiered at the 2008 Sundance Film Festival on January 19 at the Ellen Eccles Theatre. The venue incorporated a customized sound system designed especially for the premiere with new Dolby 3D technology, which John Modell referred to as "the most high tech film screening that's ever been done in history."

=== Releases and box office ===
U2 3D was slated to be screened only in IMAX theaters, but the large increase in the number of digital 3D theaters following post-production prompted the filmmakers to expand the release to include those cinemas. Two different types of polarized 3D glasses were used for the IMAX 3D and digital 3D showings; the IMAX 3D version of the film used glasses with one lens polarized horizontally and one polarized vertically, while the digital 3D version used glasses with two circularly polarized lenses. John Modell described the IMAX version as a "more immersive experience", and stated that the digital 3D version features more vivid colors.

On January 23, 2008, U2 3D was released into IMAX theaters in the United States and Canada for its initial limited release. It grossed $964,315 in the US during its opening weekend after playing in 61 theaters, and ranked at number 20 at the box office. The IMAX release took place much earlier than the film's wide release, as many IMAX theaters had booked The Spiderwick Chronicles, which was released on February 15. U2 3D was U2's second theatrically-released film, following 1988's Rattle and Hum, and the third concert film from the Vertigo Tour, following the direct-to-video releases Vertigo 2005: Live from Chicago and Vertigo 2005: Live from Milan.

The wide release was originally scheduled for February 15, 2008, but the date was pushed back one week when theater owners decided to extend the release of the 3D concert film Hannah Montana and Miley Cyrus: Best of Both Worlds Concert, which was initially scheduled to be in theaters for only one week. Instead, on February 15, U2 3D had a second limited release in select theaters in the US with RealD 3D technology. The film's European premiere took place on February 20 at the Jameson Dublin International Film Festival, followed by its international wide release on February 22. The first week of the wide release was the highest-grossing week of its theatrical run, grossing over $1 million at 686 theaters in the US and ranking at number 19 at the box office. However, comparing the box-office performance of Hannah Montana and Miley Cyrus, The Spokesman-Review's online magazine Spokane7 said U2 3D was "failing miserably". Three weeks into its wide release, U2 3D was playing in less than 100 theaters throughout the US. At the time, it had grossed less than $6.6 million, while Hannah Montana and Miley Cyrus—still playing in many theaters since its February 1 release—had brought in over $60 million. The BFI IMAX in London was reported as U2 3D's highest grossing cinema, generating $442,127 (£223,235) from over 19,000 ticket sales in the first seven weeks.

Prior to its Japan premiere in February 2009, U2 3D grossed $20 million in box-office revenue. A re-release in the US took place in 2009 to coincide with the release of U2's studio album, No Line on the Horizon, followed by re-releases in Brazil and Spain in 2011 and 2015, respectively, prior to U2's concert tours in those countries. In addition to re-releases, the Rock and Roll Hall of Fame celebrated the opening of its new theater in October 2009 by featuring screenings of U2 3D at its museum. The film's box-office run in the US ended August 26, 2010, bringing its total domestic gross to $10,363,341, after showing for 947 days. The film's distributors stated there was no predetermined limit to the length of the title's run, and the overall length would be determined by box office sales. Due to an open-ended theatrical run, total worldwide box office gross sources vary; website Box Office Mojo reported a worldwide gross of $22.7 million in December 2010, while magazine Boxoffice Pro and website The Numbers list grosses of $23.4 million and $26.2 million, respectively.

For its genre, U2 3D was successful and set several box office records. The film became the highest-grossing documentary to be eligible for an Oscar nomination at the 81st Academy Awards. U2 3D set a record in Ireland for the highest screen average of any film playing during its opening weekend, and it took in €89,538 from eight cinema screens during its first three days. In February 2011, Forbes ranked U2 3D as the fifth highest-grossing concert film, earning $14 million more than Rattle and Hum, which ranked at number seven.

The press release for the 2015 Spain re-release states that U2 3D has been licensed exclusively for theatrical release, and will not be distributed in television, internet, or other home video formats. Owens said in a 2007 interview that there are plans to release the film to a 3D home video format; however, U2 control the ancillary rights to U2 3D along with their record label Universal Music Group, and they have stated that additional rights such as those for a home video release will not be optioned until home video technology can meet the same digital 3D standards as cinema.

== Reception ==
=== Critical response ===
Based on 88 reviews by critics, Rotten Tomatoes gave U2 3D a 92% approval rating, and ranked it the fourth-best reviewed film in wide release from 2008. The website assigned it an average score of 7.5 out of 10, with a consensus that U2 3D was "an exhilarating musical experience at the price of a movie ticket". At Metacritic—which assigns a normalized rating out of 100 to reviews from mainstream critics—the film received an average score of 83, based on 19 reviews, which translates to "universal acclaim" on the website's rating scale. The film received positive reviews from Toronto Star and Variety following its 56-minute premiere at the 2007 Cannes Film Festival when the final 85-minute cut was months away from completion. Critics from publications such as the Irish Independent, The New Zealand Herald, Reno News & Review, Toronto Star, and USA Today said that the film's 3D experience was "even better than the real thing"—a reference to U2's song of the same name. Reviews by Rolling Stone and Total Film stated the film seemed to appeal to fans and non-fans of U2 alike, just as the filmmakers had intended.

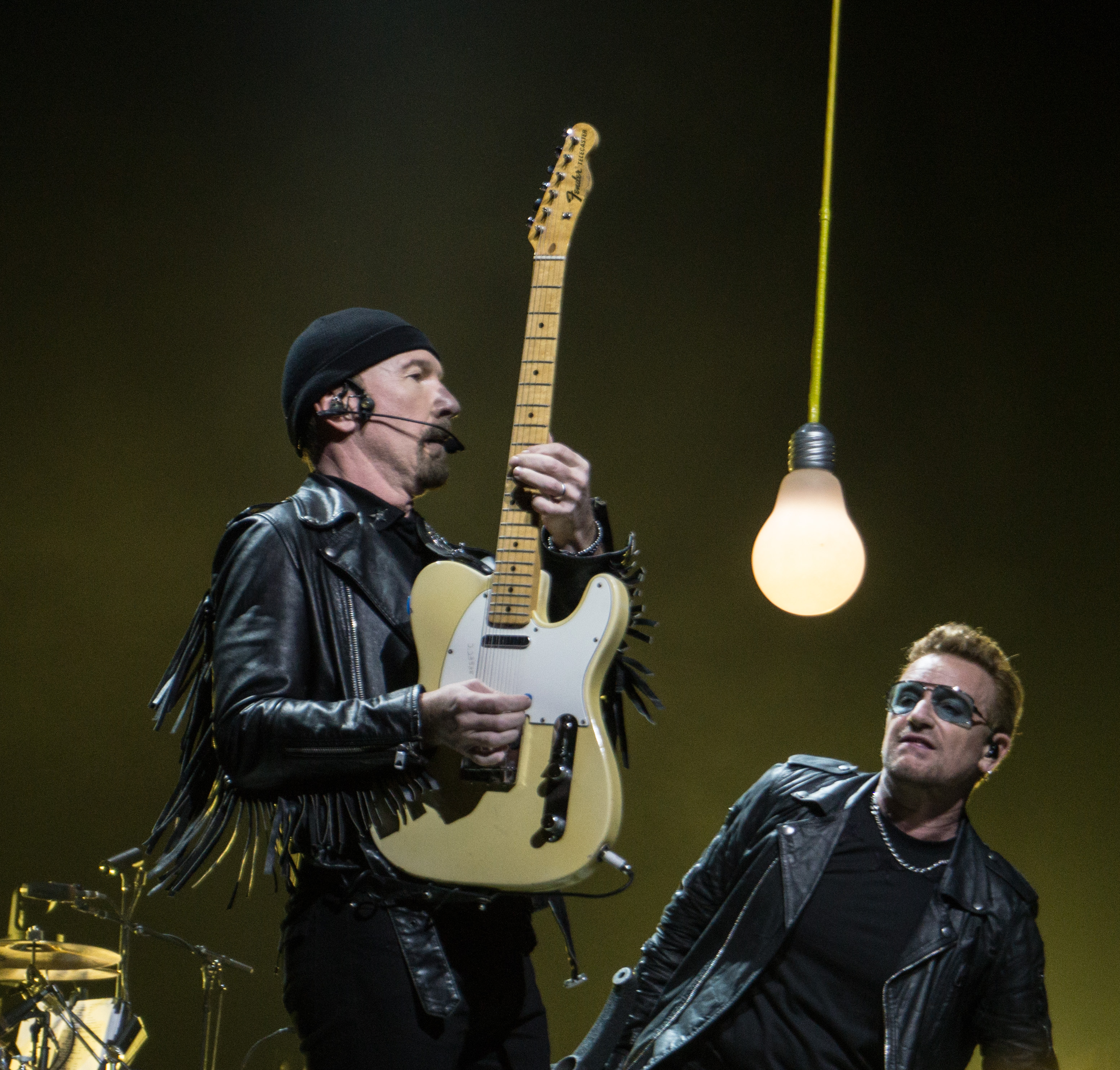
The Edge and Bono (pictured in 2015) were both pleased with the outcome of the film.

U2 3D was praised by Variety for its straightforward concert footage, compared to the interviews and behind-the-scenes footage included in Rattle and Hum. In an episode of the TV series At the Movies with Ebert & Roeper, Michael Phillips called the film "a genuine eye-fill" and Richard Roeper described it as "spectacular". The New York Times designated U2 3D as a "Critics' Pick" and stated in the review that the film was "the first IMAX movie that deserves to be called a work of art". U2 3D appeared on many critics' lists of the top 10 films released in 2008 including The Austin Chronicle, OhmyNews International, Seattle Post-Intelligencer, The Sydney Morning Herald, and River Cities' Reader. Bono was satisfied with the outcome of the film and said his favorite sequence was the performance of "Miss Sarajevo". When interviewed about the PopMart Tour in 2009, Bono said that the PopMart: Live from Mexico City video was the best project U2 had done from an audio and visual perspective, and was "eclipsed only by U2 3D". The Edge was pleased that the footage did not show any of the distress he felt from his daughter's illness during filming.

However, the film received more critical reviews. The A.V. Club graded it a B− and stated that U2's performance was less thrilling than the 3D effects. Music critic Joel Selvin wrote in the San Francisco Chronicle that seeing U2 on the big screen was "more distracting than illuminating", and Time Out London criticized Bono's political statements, stating he "should refrain from ramming his preachy political meanderings down our throats and let the music do the talking". The Daily Telegraph favored Rattle and Hum over U2 3D and called U2's performance "unexciting", criticizing how "the cameras, not the band, are doing all the work". The Guardian, which gave a rating of one out of five stars, claimed that U2 appeared to be "four conceited billionaires who are further up themselves than ever".

=== Recognition and legacy ===
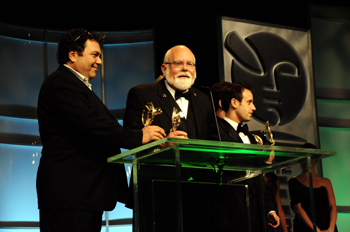
Cinematographer Peter Anderson (center) at the 7th Visual Effects Society Awards in 2009, accepting the award for Outstanding Visual Effects in a Special Venue Project for U2 3D

U2 3D was recognized favorably after its release, earning several awards. In 2008, it earned three awards, including "Best Film Produced Non-Exclusively for the Giant Screen" at the Giant Screen Cinema Association's 2008 Achievement Awards, "Best Musical Film" at Los Premios MTV Latinoamérica 2008, and the Pioneer Award (Film & Television) at the 2008 3D Film and Interactive Film Festival. In February 2009, the film received the award for Outstanding Visual Effects in a Special Venue Project from the Visual Effects Society (VES) at the 7th Annual VES Awards.

As a concert film, U2 3D has been recognized among the best in its genre; it has been ranked among the top 10 concert films by MusicRadar (2008), IndieWire (2014), and USA Today (2019). The film has also been featured on lists from 2013 of the best 3D films, published by Complex and Empire. In 2019, film critic Matt Zoller Seitz referred to U2 3D as one of "the two best modern 3D movies" and praised how it used "technology to expand the aesthetic vocabulary of cinema". As the film has only been released theatrically, Den of Geek included U2 3D in a 2010 article titled "15 movies that aren't on DVD but should be", which stated "no concert film [...] has ever come close to capturing the exact experience so accurately".

A paradigm shift we talk about a lot is going from silent to talkies, or from black and white to color. We think this [U2 3D] is a key change with regards to both digital delivery and also 3D. We all see in 3D in real life and every technological advancement in film has always been about bringing you closer and immersing you into the story or the emotion of what you're watching.

— John Modell, producer and 3ality Digital co-founder

The extensive use of technology during production was featured as the cover story in the December 2007 issue of the high-definition video magazine HDVideoPro, a month before the premiere of U2 3D. Its usage of evolutionary technology led to Catherine Owens being selected as a featured guest speaker at the SIGGRAPH 2008 conference, which took place several months after the film's release. After U2 3D received praise from fans, critics, and the film industry, several of the filmmakers stated that they felt it helped create a paradigm shift in cinema history, due to the technological advancements used in the production. Director Wim Wenders was inspired to create the 2011 3D dance documentary Pina after the attending the U2 3D screening at Cannes. The film's use of new technology inspired rock band Muse to increase the production values for their 2013 release Live at Rome Olympic Stadium, which became the first concert film shot in 4K resolution.

Following the success of U2 3D, 3ality Digital continued to pioneer 3D projects. After previously experimenting with filming American football games in 3D, 3ality Digital successfully broadcast the first live 3D NFL game in December 2008. In 2009, 3ality Digital aired the first live 3D sports broadcast available to consumers, the first 3D television advertisement, and the first 3D episode of a scripted television program. U2 show director Willie Williams recruited U2 3D director of photography Tom Krueger to design the photography and video coverage for the band's 2009–2011 U2 360° Tour. Krueger directed their subsequent concert film, U2 360° at the Rose Bowl, which was released in 2010.

== Setlist ==
All titles written by U2, except "Miss Sarajevo" (co-written with Brian Eno).

1. "Vertigo"
2. "Beautiful Day"
3. "New Year's Day"
4. "Sometimes You Can't Make It on Your Own"
5. "Love and Peace or Else"
6. "Sunday Bloody Sunday"
7. "Bullet the Blue Sky"
8. "Miss Sarajevo" / U.N. Declaration of Human Rights
9. "Pride (In the Name of Love)"
10. "Where the Streets Have No Name"
11. "One"

Encore

12. "The Fly"
13. "With or Without You"

Closing credits

14. "Yahweh"
