= 3ality Technica =

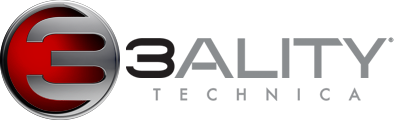
- Type: Private
- Industry: Entertainment technology
- Defunct: 2022
- Fate: Dissolved
- Headquarters: Burbank, California, United States
- Key people: Steve Schklair, Founder, Chief Executive Officer
- Products: 3Flex camera rig systems 3Space series of software applications
- Website: 3alitytechnica.com

3ality Technica, formerly 3ality Digital, was a Burbank, California based company that specialized in high-definition, live-action stereoscopic digital 3D. The company developed production systems, image processing software and other technologies that enabled the creation, post-production and distribution of live-action 3D entertainment.

3ality announced their closure in 2022.

== Products ==
3ality Technica provided technology in two categories: The company's 3Flex camera rig systems enable 3D image acquisition, and have been used in the production of feature films, scripted television shows, and live-action 3D sports broadcasts.

The company's 3Play image processing systems provide dynamic image correction, image manipulation, and multiplexing and demultiplexing algorithms for transporting 3D high-definition content over conventional high-definition infrastructure channels.

In 2012, the company built next-generation stereoscopic 3D system Helix allowing two cameras to be aligned with sub-pixel accuracy.

== Production ==
3ality Technica also provided production services to demonstrate the functionality of its systems. The company produced the first movie shot completely in live-action digital 3D, U2 3D. They shot the live-action footage for the first 3D commercial aired during the Super Bowl, Sobe's "Lizard Lake." They shot a 3D episode of Chuck. They produced the first live 3D broadcast of an NFL football game, and produced (with Fox Sports) the first live 3D broadcast of the BCS Championship Game. In August, 2009, 3ality Digital announced that it had formed an alliance with Imagica, Corp. to bring stereoscopic live-action 3D production to Asia using 3ality Digital's technology. In February 2011, 3ality Technica & Digital Revolution Studios produced the 2011 3D Creative Arts Awards "Your World in 3D", which was the first award show filmed in native 3D and televised on 3net 3D channel broadcast on DirectTV. The production was filmed at the Grauman's Chinese Theatre in Hollywood. In August 2011, they shot Britney Spears's Femme Fatale Tour in Toronto, which was released in DVD/Blu-ray 2D in November. The 3D version of this concert will be available for customers of Samsung's new 3D TVs.

== Film productions ==
| Film | SIP | Camera Rig | Camera |
|---|---|---|---|
| A Very Harold & Kumar 3D Christmas | | 3ality Technica Quasar 3D Rig | Panavision Genesis |
| ABCD: Any Body Can Dance | 3ality Technica - SIP (Stereoscopic Image Processor) | 3ality Technica Atom 3D Rig | Red Epic |
| Alatchakra: Circle of Desire | | 3ality Technica TS-5 3D Rig | |
| The Amazing Spider-Man: The Untold Story | Technica - SIP (Stereoscopic Image Processor) | 3ality Technica TS-5 3D Rig | Red Epic |
| Bait 3D | | 3ality Technica Quasar 3D Rig | Red One |
| Dark Country | | 3ality Technica Dark Country 3D Rig | Red One |
| The Darkest Hour (film) | 3ality Technica - SIP (Stereoscopic Image Processor) | 3ality Technica Quasar 3D Rig | Sony CineAlta F35 |
| The Great Gatsby (2013 film) | 3ality Technica - SIP (Stereoscopic Image Processor) | 3ality Technica TS-5 3D Rig | Red Epic |
| The Hobbit: An Unexpected Journey | 3ality Technica - SIP (Stereoscopic Image Processor) | 3ality Technica TS-5 3D Rig | Red Epic |
| I Heart Shakey | | 3ality Technica Quasar 3D Rig] | Red One |
| Jack the Giant Slayer | 3ality Technica - SIP (Stereoscopic Image Processor) | 3ality Technica TS-5 3D Rig | Red Epic |
| Journey 2: The Mysterious Island | | 3ality Technica Neutron 3D Rig | Sony CineAlta F35 |
| The Mortician | | 3ality Technica Quasar 3D Rig | Red One |
| Napoleon Kaput | | 3ality Technica Quasar 3D Rig | Red One |
| OM (Kalyan Ram) | 3ality Technica - SIP (Stereoscopic Image Processor) | 3ality Technica TS-5 3D Rig | |
| Oz: The Great and Powerful | 3ality Technica - SIP (Stereoscopic Image Processor) | 3ality Technica Atom 3D Rig | Red Epic |
| Pirates of the Caribbean: On Stranger Tides | | 3ality Technica Quasar 3D Rig | Red Epic / Red One |
| Planet B-Boy | 3ality Technica - SIP (Stereoscopic Image Processor) | 3ality Technica TS-5 3D Rig | |
| Prometheus (2012 film) | 3ality Technica - SIP (Stereoscopic Image Processor) | 3ality Technica Atom 3D Rig | Red Epic |
| Resident Evil: Retribution | | 3ality Technica Atom 3D Rig | Red Epic |
| Rudhramadevi | 3ality Technica - SIP (Stereoscopic Image Processor) | 3ality Technica Atom 3D Rig | |
| Saw VII 3D: The Final Chapter | | 3ality Technica Neutron 3D Rig | SI-2K |
| Silent Hill: Revelation 3D | | 3ality Technica Neutron, Pulsar & Quasar 3D Rigs | Red Epic |
| Stalingrad (2013 film) | 3ality Technica - SIP (Stereoscopic Image Processor) | 3ality Technica TS-5 3D Rig | Red Epic |
| Step Up Revolution | 3ality Technica - SIP (Stereoscopic Image Processor) | 3ality Technica TS-5 3D Rig | Red Epic |
| The Texas Chainsaw Massacre 3D | 3ality Technica - SIP (Stereoscopic Image Processor) | 3ality Technica TS-5 3D Rigs | Red Epic |
| Torrente 4: Lethal Crisis | | 3ality Technica Quasar & Neutron 3D Rig | Sony CineAlta F35 |
| Underworld: Awakening | 3ality Technica - SIP (Stereoscopic Image Processor) | 3ality Technica Atom 3D Rig | Red Epic |
| Universal Soldier: Day of Reckoning | | 3ality Technica Quasar 3D Rig | Red Epic / Red One |
| Walking with Dinosaurs | | 3ality Technica Atom 3D Rig | Red Epic |
