= 3D rig =

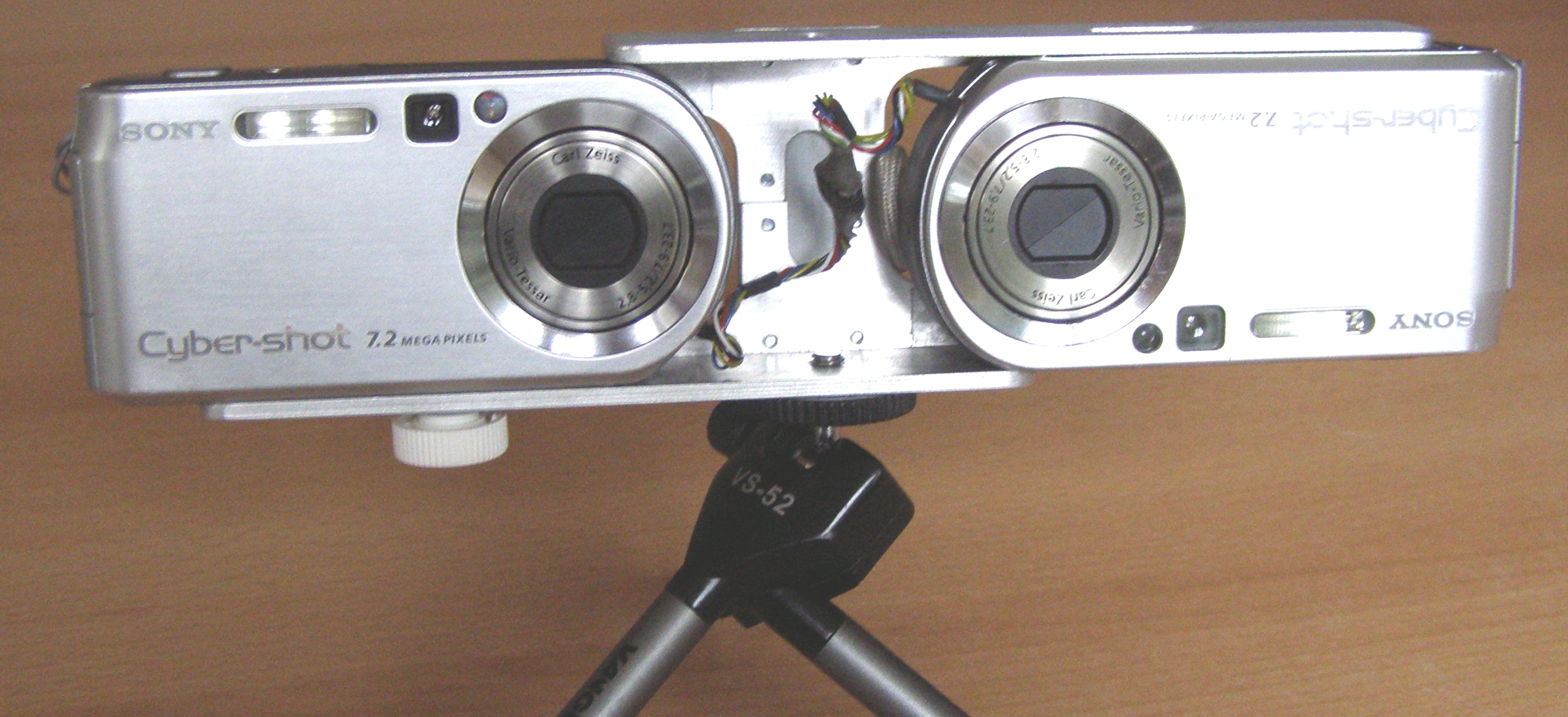
Two photo cameras mounted with a known distance between them to facilitate 3D imagery

A 3D rig is a device for mounting two cameras together to one 3D-system in order to shoot stereoscopic films and images.

== Background ==
To create stereoscopic depth illusion in movie or photography, two slightly different images have to be viewed at the same time, each of them presented to one eye.

In order to capture moving objects, the images have to be taken in exactly the same moment. Therefore, it is necessary to shoot with two cameras that are in sync. In addition to that the cameras have to be geometrically aligned accurately, to minimize the amount of stereoscopic errors.

A 3D Rig, as a result, must provide the possibility to mount two cameras, with a horizontal offset and adjust the cameras in all possible axes. For 3D moviemaking, it is also necessary that the horizontal distance between the cameras can be adjusted via remote control while shooting. It is important that the rigs have a high stability. This is to assure that they do not deform during movement, for example on a crane. Otherwise this could impact or destroy the camera alignment.

In general there are two types of 3D Rigs, side-by-side rigs and mirror rigs.

== Side-by-side rig ==
=== Set-up ===
The least complex way to take pictures or shoot film in 3D is having two cameras mounted side-by-side. They are aligned parallel to each other, or can be angulated so that their optical axes meet at a chosen distance. In some systems the cameras are fixed to the rig body and can not be moved. More professional side-by-side-rigs, however, offer the possibility to change the interaxial distance easily.

=== When to use ===
A side-by-side rig is a proper way to do wide shots like landscape or overviews in sport broadcasting, however they cannot be used for close-ups since the minimum distance between the cameras is limited to the size of the lenses.

=== Advantages ===
Side-by-side rigs are comparably easy to build and therefore cheap. They also often provide bigger possible interaxial distances than mirror rigs, which can be used to create a miniaturization effect.

=== Disadvantages ===
Side-by-side rigs cannot be used for close-ups since the minimum distance between the cameras is limited to the size of the lenses. For close-up shots though it is necessary to have smaller interaxial distances. For most shooting situations in live-action film therefore mirror rigs are used.

== Mirror rig ==
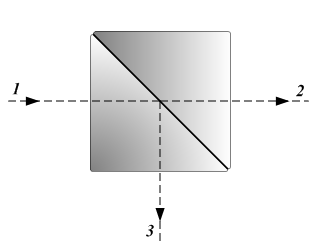
Schematic illustration of a beam splitter.

=== Set-up ===
In a mirror rig the two cameras look through a beamsplitter. One camera sees right through it. The other one captures the reflected image. One camera is placed above or below the other one at a ninety-degree angle. In some rigs only one camera can be moved. This can throw the system's weight out of balance, which can cause problems when used on a camera stabilization mount (e.g. Steadicam). Others offer the possibility to move both cameras simultaneously.

=== When to use ===
The mirror rig is the one to choose for shooting live action film. “It makes the best 3D pictures, and some stereographers would say ‘the only good 3D pictures’”. Because the cameras in this setup aren’t physically in their way, the distance between the optical axes of the cameras can be smaller than the size of the lenses and even down to zero. Shots with small interaxial distances are possible, which is necessary for shooting in a classical movie style with close-up and detail shots.

=== Advantages ===
Mirror rigs make telling stories with classical tools of film narration possible. For close-ups, two shots, details and most dialogue scenes, the interaxial distance has to be not more than a couple of millimeters. This is only possible with a mirror rig. To simply zoom in or use long lenses to get close-up shots with a side-by-side rig leads to a bad roundness.

Another advantage is, that the images can be used for the geometrical alignment of the cameras since stereoscopic errors can be seen most easily when the interaxial distance is zero.

=== Disadvantages ===
With the mirror there is one more optical element that has to be handled and manufactured carefully, which makes these rigs usually more expensive than side-by-side rigs. "The use of mirrors makes it sensitive to dust and fast accelerations. The mirror needs to be big enough to accommodate wide angles. It requires accurate mirror placement toward the cameras; otherwise keystone artifacts will affect the images." The mirror itself also takes away one f-stop since the light is split up for the two cameras. Mirrors of bad quality can produce a color mismatch that has to be corrected in postproduction. In addition to that every mirror filters the light according to its polarization. This leads to brightness differences between the two images especially at reflections and transparent objects.

== See also ==
- Multiple-camera setup
- Omnidirectional camera
- Stereo photography techniques
