= List of Star Wars: Knights of the Old Republic characters =

The video games Star Wars: Knights of the Old Republic (2003) and Star Wars Knights of the Old Republic II: The Sith Lords (2004) features a large cast of characters noted for its diversity and is the subject of significant discussion from gaming magazines and websites.

The main and player character of the first game is Revan, and the main and player character of the second game is the Jedi Exile. Both can be either a human male or a human female. Various other characters join the player's party and become controllable, with a maximum of three characters at a time.

== Concept and creation ==
Chris Avellone, the lead designer of The Sith Lords, has said that "a core part of what made KOTOR I so great was the story and your companions, and that was our intention in the sequel as well", and has also said that he thought that the characters and voice-acting were some of the key strengths of The Sith Lords, and said that they got a lot of help and support from LucasArts in the voice-acting and sound department. Avellone stated that in some cases, the characters turned out "better than we thought they would be". According to Avellone, while "there was some stuff we wanted to add", overall they "got almost everything we wanted in there". Avellone has said he has been surprised by the positive feedback of some of the characters.

== Player characters ==
=== Revan ===
The main protagonist and player character of the first game is Revan, an amnesiac Sith Lord who is reassigned a new identity as a member of the Republic army. Revan's true identity is not revealed until a predetermined point in the narrative where the player is confronted by the game's central antagonist Darth Malak for the first time. Revan's gender, class, and facial appearance are chosen and customised by the player. Since the player can choose the gender of Revan, much of the dialogue revolving around the character is gender-neutral with only a few exceptions.

=== Jedi Exile ===
The Jedi Exile, also known simply as the Exile, is the main protagonist and player character of the second game. The player may choose the name and gender and decide what path to take.

According to continuity established by Star Wars: The Old Republic and its associated supplementary material, in Star Wars Legends, rendered non-canonical in 2014, the Jedi Exile is named Meetra Surik, who is female and aligned to the light-side of the Force.

== Other playable characters ==
=== Recurring characters ===
==== Canderous Ordo ====
Canderous Ordo, voiced by John Cygan, is a Mandalorian who appears in both the first game and in The Sith Lords. Ordo is a veteran Mandalorian warrior who joins the player's party in Knights of the Old Republic. After the game's conclusion, he becomes "Mandalore the Preserver", leader of the Mandalorians. Mandalore pledges himself and his warriors to the service of the Jedi Exile in The Sith Lords.

UGO Networks ranked Ordo among their list of top fifty Expanded Universe characters.

==== T3-M4 ====
T3-M4 is an astromech droid who appears in both games. It was constructed by a Twi'lek named Janice Nall of Taris for local crime lord, Davik Kang. The droid features code-breaking and computer "slicing" skills in addition to being able to mount armor and weapon upgrades. If the player attempts to talk to T3 it will simply communicate in a series of bleeps, similar to other astromech droids like R2-D2.

==== HK-47 ====
HK-47, voiced by Kristoffer Tabori, is an assassin droid owned by Revan, who appears in both of the games. In 2003 HK-47 won Computer Gaming World's "NPC of the Year" award, and later won the category of "Original Game Character of the Year" in the 2004 Game Developers Choice Awards.

=== Knights of the Old Republic characters ===
An illustration of Revan's companions in the first Knights of the Old Republic. From left to right: HK-47, Canderous Ordo, Jolee Bindo, Juhani, Bastila Shan, Carth Onasi, Mission Vao, Zaalbar, and T3-M4.

==== Carth Onasi ====
Carth Onasi, voiced by Raphael Sbarge, is a Republic soldier and pilot. During the Mandalorian wars, Carth served under Admiral Saul Karath, who would become his mentor and, later, object of revenge. He met Revan while the two were fleeing the Endar Spire, following a Sith attack on the ship. He is the second character to become a party member in the first game, after Trask Ulgo sacrifices himself to fend off the Sith apprentice Darth Bandon. It is later revealed that Carth had a family on Telos who were killed by the Sith: his son Dustil later turns up as a Sith convert and the player has the option of killing him or opening his eyes. He is a romance option for the female Revan. Carth can appear briefly in the sequel, The Sith Lords, via recorded audio and video messages.

Carth is assigned to the cruiser Endar Spire during the Jedi Civil War when it was ambushed by a Sith fleet over the planet Taris. He narrowly escapes by taking an escape pod to the planet surface with an amnesiac Revan, who was memory wiped and given a new identity as a rank-and-file Republic soldier. The two searched for, and eventually rescued, the Jedi Bastila Shan from a swoop bike gang. Stealing the ship the Ebon Hawk from the crime lord Davik Kang, Carth and his companions escape Taris just as Darth Malak orders an orbital bombardment on its surface. After arriving at the Jedi Academy on Dantooine, he was tasked with searching for the Star Maps and the Star Forge along with Bastila and Revan. While searching for the Star Maps, Carth and his companions were captured by Admiral Karath and taken aboard his ship, the Leviathan. After breaking out, Bastila, Carth, and Revan managed to make it to the bridge of the ship, where Saul is defeated and killed. As he lay dying, Saul whispered Revan's true identity to Carth, to his dismay. Depending on Revan's alignment and relationship with Carth, Carth may accept that Revan is no longer a Sith Lord and had truly been redeemed. In the alternative, if Revan sides with Bastila later in the game and reassumes the mantle of Dark Lord of the Sith, Carth flees from the party and disappears: if the dark-sided Revan is female, Carth will confront her and Bastila in the Star Forge's hangar after the defeat of Darth Malak, leading to a second boss fight.

Depending on dialogue options made by the player character during certain conversations about how the aftermath of the so-called Jedi Civil War in the first game affects the branching narrative for Star Wars: Knights of the Old Republic II: The Sith Lords, Carth may make a brief appearances in the game, or be referenced by other characters such as HK-47.

In The Sith Lords, following the destruction of the Star Forge and the end of the Jedi Civil War and if Revan returns to the Jedi, Carth is promoted to Admiral. Revan tasked Carth with protecting the Republic and left in search for the true Sith Empire in the Unknown Regions prior to the events of the game. When the Sith Lord Darth Nihilus attacks Telos five years after the end of the Jedi Civil War, Carth leads the Republic fleet in defense of the planet and the space station orbiting above it. He also requests to speak with the Jedi Exile about Revan's whereabouts, where his dialogue content will differ depending on Revan's gender and the nature of his relationship with Revan. If Revan is female and if the player completes T3-M4's repairs, the droid will play a holovid recording of Carth discussing Revan, which again differs in content based on her final moral alignment.

Carth first appears in Issue No. 8 of the Star Wars: Knights of the Old Republic comic series as the helmsman serving aboard the Inexpugnable-class tactical command ship Courageous. He is often referred to by the nickname "Fleet" during this time period. Carth participates in several battles, where he eventually met the fugitive Padawan Zayne Carrick, who is disguised as a janitor. Carth later appears in a more prominent role for several of the series' story arcs.

==== Mission Vao ====
Mission Vao, voiced by Catherine Taber, appears in Knights of the Old Republic. She is a fourteen-year-old Twi'lek and the best friend of Zaalbar. Mission joins the player's party after encountering her in the Undercity on Taris. Mission is first seen in a Lower City bar on the planet Taris, and is later encountered in its Undercity. She is distraught that her Wookiee companion Zaalbar has been captured by the Gamorrean slavers during a trip into the sewers of the Undercity, and seeks help to rescue Zaalbar. Zaalbar swears fealty to the player character upon his rescue, and both he and Mission join the player character's party as companions for the remainder of the game. Optional conversations with Mission will reveal details about her past and how she and Zaalbar met, and eventually unlocks a subplot side quest involving her brother Griff. Towards the end of the game, if the player character embraces their identity as Darth Revan, Dark Lord of the Sith and sides with a fallen Bastila Shan, Mission and Zaalbar will attempt to defect from the party. The player will have to either kill them, or in the alternative, exploit Zaalbar's life debt and force him to murder Mission on their behalf. If Zaalbar is forced to kill Mission, he will turn on Revan if he is brought along as a companion to the Star Forge.

Mission's past is explored in the twenty-second issue in the Star Wars: Knights of the Old Republic series of comics. Mission has been mentioned in the massively multiplayer online game Star Wars: The Old Republic as well as Star Wars reference books, such as the second volume of The Complete Star Wars Encyclopedia.

==== Zaalbar ====
Zaalbar is a character from Knights of the Old Republic. He is a Wookiee who is friends with Mission Vao and joins the player's party, swearing a life-debt to the player for helping Mission rescue him from a group of Gammorrean slavers in the Undercity of Taris. Zaalbar is the brother to Chuundar, the leader of a tribe on their home planet Kashyyyk. When the player's party first lands on Kashyyyk, Zaalbar is referred to as "mad-claw". Through Zaalbar's and Chuundar's father, Freyyr, Revan learns why Zaalbar was banished from the tribe: Zaalbar learned that Chuundar was selling Wookiee slaves to Czerka Corporation, and in a fit of rage attacked him with his bare claws, breaking a major Wookiee taboo; this led Freyyr to disbelieve Zaalbar and side with Chuundar, and thus Zaalbar was exiled. When Revan and Freyyr confront Chuundar, Zaalbar sides with Freyyr and Revan and in turn kills Chuundar, freeing the Wookiees and driving Czerka off the planet. A dark-side alternative has Revan kill Freyyr, allowing Czerka's slave trade on Kashyyyk to continue: a dark-sided Revan can also order Zaalbar to kill Mission in order to fulfill his life-debt – this may cause Zaalbar to turn against Revan as well.

==== Bastila Shan ====
Bastila Shan, voiced by Jennifer Hale, is a Jedi who defeated Revan prior to the beginning of Knights of the Old Republic. The first part of the game is spent searching for her after the Endar Spire is destroyed, and she joins the party upon her rescue from slavers. Darth Malak later captures her and seduces her to the dark side. Revan later confronts Bastila in a lightsaber duel and has the option of killing her or allowing her to live: a dark-side character makes her their apprentice, while a light-side character helps her redeem herself by helping the Republic fleet. Later Star Wars Legends continuity adopts the outcome in which Bastila is redeemed by a male Revan, whom she later marries, and survives the destruction of the Star Forge.

==== Juhani ====
Juhani, voiced by Courtenay Taylor, is a Cathar padawan who incorrectly believed she killed her master. She turned to the dark side and tainted the grove on Dantooine where she lived. Depending on which path the conversation is steered in by the player, Revan may either fight (and kill) her, or redeem her, where she joins the party to discover the location of the Star Forge and returns to the Order as a Jedi Knight. Juhani is the first explicitly LGBTQ character in Star Wars media.

==== Jolee Bindo ====
Jolee Bindo, voiced by Kevin Michael Richardson, is a character in Star Wars: Knights of the Old Republic. Jolee is an old hermit living in the Shadowlands on the forest floor of Kashyyyk and a former Jedi Padawan. Bindo helps Revan bypass shield generators that lead deeper into the Shadowlands to find the Star Map and remains with Revan's party. After the main character gains experience, Jolee tells the tale of how he was once a smuggler, and through this met his wife. Against the wishes of the Jedi Council, he trained her in the way of the Force. She was then seduced to the dark side by Exar Kun, upon failing to convince Jolee to join Exar Kun as well, she drew her lightsaber on him. Jolee won the fight, but he was unable to bring himself to kill her. She escaped and went on to kill many Jedi. Jolee expected to be punished harshly for his mistakes, but the Council said he had learned his lesson the hard way, and even considered promoting him to knighthood. Disappointed with the Jedi's decision, Jolee left the Order and started wandering the galaxy before crash landing on Kashyyyk, where he lived for 20 years until he met Revan. Due to his personality traits and neutral alignment that classify him as a "Gray Jedi", Jolee is able to wield light and dark side Force powers equally without difficulty or fully committing to either side.

Kimberley Wallace of Game Informer included Jolee Bindo in her list of best BioWare characters; she called him a "cranky old man who hacks the hell out of enemies is hard to top". According to Wallace, "he almost beats HK-47 for his power with sarcasm, as Jolee Bindo's self-ridicule is part of his charm", and claims that he will perhaps never live down his infamous line, "I did it all for the Wookiees!"

=== The Sith Lords characters ===
An illustration of some of the major characters in the second Knights of the Old Republic, featuring dark and light side versions of a male Jedi Exile and his companions Bao-Dur, Atton Rand, and Mical the Disciple. On the far left is Visas Marr and on the far right is Brianna the Handmaiden.

==== Kreia ====
Kreia, voiced by Sara Kestelman, is the teacher and mentor to the Jedi Exile in The Sith Lords. Near the end of the game, she is revealed to have been Darth Traya, the Lord of Betrayal, all along. Her character received mixed reception since the game's publication, but is generally thought to be one of the most well developed backgrounds and characterizations in retrospective reviews.

==== Atton Rand ====
Atton Rand, voiced by Nicky Katt, is a character in The Sith Lords. Atton is a human pilot that the Exile meets on the asteroid mining station Peragus II, and is patterned after the iconic Star Wars character Han Solo. Atton can become a Jedi Sentinel once the player character accrues enough influence with him.

==== Bao-Dur ====
Bao-Dur, voiced by Roger G. Smith, is a character in Star Wars: Knights of the Old Republic II: The Sith Lords. He is a Zabrak engineer from Iridonia, who fought under the command of the Jedi Exile during the Mandalorian Wars. Bao-Dur is the inventor of the Mass Shadow Generator that ended the battle on Malachor V by completely obliterating the Mandalorian Armada and inadvertently killing many Republic soldiers on his own side of the battle, leading to a great deal of guilt later in his life. The Exile, who did not know Bao-Dur on a personal level at the time, gave the command, which sent massive echoes in the Force throughout the galaxy. Bao-Dur is trainable as a Jedi Guardian.

==== Visas Marr ====
Visas Marr, voiced by Kelly Hu, appears in The Sith Lords as an apprentice of Darth Nihilus. She is a Miraluka from the planet of Katarr where all living things except for her were consumed by Darth Nihilus. While she is considered blind, she is able to see through the Force which allowed her to find the Jedi Exile, although her personal sight is slightly affected by her trauma. When she confronts the Exile, she loses and in turn becomes part of their party. She pledges her loyalty to the Exile, whom she sees as a kindred soul due to the Exile's own experiences. Eventually the player confronts Nihilus with Visas, and needs to kill him. The player may choose to have Visas sacrifice herself to weaken Nihilus.

Brian Menze designed the character, and drew on ninjas, the look of previous Sith Lords, and G.I. Joe character the Baroness in creating her concept art. As the character was mostly covered – only the lower half of her face is visible – Menze decided to make what was shown "as sexy as possible". Menze deviated from the usual black Sith Lords dressed in and instead added some color to soften her, based on the written description of the character. Menze noted that the character has since become a fan favorite and a popular choice for cosplay activities at fan conventions. Voice directors Will Beckman and Darragh O'Farrell wanted someone "special" and "maybe a little sexy" to voice the part. It was Hu's first role as a voice-actress, and she has said she enjoyed the role.

==== Brianna ====
Brianna, voiced by Grey DeLisle, is the "Last Handmaiden" on a Jedi Academy located on Telos IV in Star Wars: Knights of the Old Republic II: The Sith Lords. She initially does not reveal her name to the Exile; until she mentions her name late in the game, she is referred to as the Handmaiden. Brianna and her five half-sisters serve Atris, who orders her to join the party after leaving Telos on the Ebon Hawk if the player's character is male. She turns out to be the daughter of an exiled Jedi master, Arren Kae, who vanished during the Mandalorian Wars. As a consequence, she is Force-sensitive and interested in Jedi lore, which alienated her from her family. Her training before joining the Exile's party makes her a skilled close quarter combatant and, after fulfilling certain combat and conversation requirements, she can be trained to become a Jedi Guardian or a Dark Jedi Guardian. It is revealed by Kreia that Brianna eventually takes up Atris' role as the historian of the Jedi.

==== Mical ====
Mical, also known as the Disciple, is a character in The Sith Lords voiced by Greg Ellis. He is a former Jedi apprentice, who expected the Jedi Exile to become his master before the Exile left for the Mandalorian Wars. With nobody left to teach him due to the turmoil of the wars, he was ultimately refused for Jedi training. He then became a historian and a medic. He is a playable character that joins the player's party on Dantooine if the Exile is female. The Disciple can be influenced by light side acts and can be trained as a Jedi Consular.

==== Mira ====
Mira, voiced by Emily Berry, appears in The Sith Lords. Mira lost her family during the Mandalorian Wars and became a slave to the Mandalorians, eventually being trained as a scout and soldier. By the end of the wars, the Galactic Republic was flooding with refugees, and many of them, including Mira, ended up in the refugee sector of Nar Shaddaa. To survive in the hostile environment, she became a bounty hunter with the purpose of earning credits and to help others to find their loved ones. A rival bounty hunter, the Wookiee Hanharr, was employed to hunt her by an unknown person. Mira will join player characters who are oriented towards light-sided or neutral alignments, and can become a Jedi Sentinel.

Menze had a "shaggy-like character from the Hanna-Barbera cartoon Speed Buggy" as a reference for Mira. Her visual design was based on the appearances of women Menze described as the "gothic girl gamer" who attend shows or fan conventions in the early 2000's, and whose stylistic choices included dyed hair, strapped platform leather boots and Hello Kitty backpacks, as he had hoped to tap into a likeness that these fans would respond to.

==== Hanharr ====
Hanharr is a Wookiee bounty hunter in The Sith Lords, and can play different roles within the game, depending on the alignment of the player character. He is a psychotic Wookie who became a bounty hunter after being enslaved by Czerka. Hanharr is encountered on the planet Nar Shaddaa, as is Mira, another bounty hunter, whom he owes a life-debt to and repeatedly tries to kill to escape it. One of these will join the party of the Jedi Exile, as is determined by the personality of the player character. Light-side and neutral players are joined by Mira, dark-side players are joined by Hanharr. On the light-side and neutral paths, Mira duels and leaves Hanharr for dead and is saved by Kreia, cursing him with another life-debt as a Sith minion. The two engaged in a final duel on Malachor V, where Hanharr lost again, but Mira grants him his request for death and freeing him from his life-debt. Unlike other party members, Hanharr is not Force-sensitive, due to George Lucas forbidding further creation of Wookiee Jedi characters in Legends continuity.

==== G0-T0 ====
G0-T0, voiced by Daran Norris, is a droid who appears in The Sith Lords. Built to oversee and aid in the planetary reconstruction of the planet Telos, its programming included two directives: produce options to rebuild the Republic and follow all the laws of the Republic. Sadly, all options G0-T0 could think of to assist the Republic would involve breaking a Republic law. Following this, the droid 'broke'; it overrode the second directive, and set up The Exchange, the greatest smuggling organization in the galaxy. Eventually the droid would be destroyed, but not before the organization had helped countless systems achieve prosperity.

== Major antagonists ==
=== Darth Malak ===
Darth Malak, voiced by Rafael Ferrer, is the former apprentice of Revan and the main antagonist of the first game. As Jedi, Malak and Revan disobeyed the Jedi Council and helped the Republic defend against the Mandalorians. During the war, Malak was captured by them for a time and experimented upon, which caused his baldness. It was also during the Mandalorian Wars that he got the name "Malak", his birth name being "Alek". He got blue head tattoos and started calling himself Malak to escape the arrest warrant issued by the Jedi Council, and he later decided to keep this name in protest until the war is over. At the end of the Mandalorian Wars, however, both Revan and Malak fell to the dark side and turned against the Republic. Malak became Revan's Sith apprentice but in time viewed Revan as too soft, which led to a duel that ended with Revan cutting off his lower jaw, making Malak wear a metallic jaw guard. Malak later betrays Revan when he is facing Jedi and usurps the title of Dark Lord of the Sith, but Revan survives the attack, at the cost of his memory. Under Malak's leadership, the Sith devastate planets Taris and Dantooine, while Revan regains his power in the search for the ancient space factory The Star Forge where he defeats Malak in the game's final battle, having already bested Malak's apprentices Darth Bandon and Bastila.

Malak's prosthetic lower jaw was a point of disagreement during development. Concept-art director John Gallagher said he objected to the missing-jaw concept and thought the result looked poorly realized. He suggested concealing the injury beneath a high collar rather than using the metal prosthesis, and ultimately declined to design the character after the rest of the team supported the existing concept. Gallagher later said that he accepted the decision but still did not regard Malak as one of the game's stronger visual designs. The dispute reflected the collaborative nature of Knights of the Old Republic's character design, in which artists, writers, and project leads produced and criticized multiple visual concepts before choosing the final versions.

GamePro's Hugh Sterbakov ranked Darth Malak as 22nd most diabolical videogame villain of all time, saying he was "one of, if not the coolest expanded universe Star Wars character yet". UGO Networks put the character as their 19th top Star Wars Expanded Universe character. On GameSpot's "All-Time Greatest Villain" competition in 2011, Darth Malak managed to get into the top sixteen. GameDaily's Robert Workman put Darth Malak as their 16th top evil mastermind of all time. Workman also listed Malak as one of his favourite Star Wars video game characters.

=== Darth Sion ===
Darth Sion, voiced by Louis Mellis, is an antagonist in The Sith Lords. Darth Traya trained both Sion and Nihilus, who in turn betrayed her. He holds his ravaged, necrotic body together by drawing on his constant pain using the dark side of the Force, making himself virtually unkillable. The player's character Jedi Exile eventually defeats Sion several times, and convinces him to end his own miserable existence by letting go of the Force.

Chris Avellone, lead designer of The Sith Lords, was inspired to create Sion by Tessai's death scene in Ninja Scroll. In contrast to other characters, Sion's design took much longer to hone down. Brian Menze, creator of the concept art and in-game model, had difficulty finding a design that Avellone was satisfied with, and the two had many conversations on how he should appear. It was planned that Sion would have small parts of him orbiting around him. Engine troubles, however, made that difficult, ultimately resulting in a character looking far more "human". Voice directors Will Beckman and Darragh O'Farrell originally sought to hire someone with an English accent, rather than the Scottish one found in the game. Problems arose due to most English actors lacking deep voices, though afterwards they wished to avoid making Sion "too Scottish", wishing to avoid creating a caricature to American ears. They called Sion's voice one of their favorites in The Sith Lords.

=== Darth Nihilus ===
Darth Nihilus appears in Knights of the Old Republic II – The Sith Lords as one of the titular Sith Lords. He is known as the Lord of Hunger, capable of draining the life force out of any living thing, and intends to consume as much life in the galaxy as possible. He is depicted as a wraith-like being who speaks in unintelligible rasps and feasts on the Force like a parasite. Nihilus bound his consciousness into his robes and mask in order to preserve his physical form. Prior to the game's events, Darth Sion, Darth Nihilus and Darth Traya formed a Triumvirate as leaders of the resurgent Sith based on Malachor V, though not long after, Traya was betrayed and beaten by the other two, with Nihilus cutting her off from the Force. He then uses the might of the Sith Armada not to conquer planets, but to contain them so that he could "feed" off the Force energy of each planet's lifeforms, wiping planets of life, replacing its chaos with stillness. Nihilus is defeated in the game after being tricked by the resurgent Traya into launching an attack on Telos, believing it to harbour a Jedi academy. The Exile, together with Canderous Ordo and Nihilus' former apprentice Visas Marr confront the Sith Lord on his ship, the Ravager, and Nihilus is slain after his desperate attempt to feast on the Exile – a wound in the Force – backfires and weakens him. To cripple him further, the Exile may exploit Visas' Force bond with her former master by having her mentally throw him off balance or even sacrifice herself.

Nihilus appears in the "Unseen, Unheard" story in the final issue of Star Wars Tales, which recounts Nihilus using his power to decimate all life on the Miraluka colony world of Katarr, including the vast majority of the Jedi Order's leadership. Visas Marr is shown as the sole survivor of the catastrophic event, which impressed Nihilus and moved him to claim her as his apprentice and slave. Nihilus is mentioned in a few other stories in the original Star Wars Expanded Universe, and makes a short appearance in Star Wars: Legacy. The character's distinctive mask is also made available as a loot item for Star Wars: The Old Republic if the Crime Lord's Cartel Pack DLC is installed. Nihilus is introduced to the Galaxy of Heroes mobile game as a playable character in a 2017 update. As the "face" of the marketing for The Sith Lords, the character has been featured prominently in promotional material and subject to merchandise, including several action figures.

Nihilus was written so players would identify him less as a "human" and more a "force of nature". Avellone described him as without personality beyond "just a feeling of hunger" due to having succumbed so far to the dark side. Avellone felt beating such a force seemed "more heroic" or "far more epic" than taking on an individual person. The character's visual was quick to define; Eurogamer describes him as "a concept created and greenlit in all of 15 minutes". Character modeller and lead concept artist Brian Menze was asked to create a Sith Lord with No-Face from Hayao Miyazaki's Spirited Away (2001) as a reference; Avellone felt that the final design, which employs a lot of voluminous black, was closer to the Studio Ghibli character than was intended. One idea behind Nihilus's design was that there should be nothing behind the mask – representative of him being a void. A "pet peeve" of Avellone's is promotional art of Nihilus with a visible nose, which contradicted his concept of a character who lack facial features; Menze had drawn a nosed Nihilus for a magazine cover which had become widely circulated and Avellone had "let it go", to Menze's now regret.

Nihilus is considered to be one of the best remembered aspects of The Sith Lords's story. IGN's Jesse Schedeen singled out his obliteration of Visas' homeworld as the Sith Lord's "defining moment of villainy". Chris Freiberg from Den of Geek ranked the introduction of Darth Nihilus as one of the most memorable moments in Star Wars video game history. Glixel listed him as one of twenty "awesome" Star Wars characters originating in video games, and considered him "terrifying" and "more of a malevolent ghost than a typical self-serving Sith".

Nihilus' visual design proved to be very popular with Star Wars fandom. Revan aside, Eurogamer's Robert Purchese described The Sith Lords' villains as "far more memorable" than those of the first game, and described Nihilus as the most recognisable of the trio. Schedeen remarked that "Nihilus probably wins the award for coolest-looking Star Wars villain ever". The Citizen's Lake Life editor David Wilcox opined that Darth Nihilus is the best designed character outside of the Star Wars saga's "main players". The character has been frequently referenced in fan art, cosplay and other derivative works since his appearance in The Sith Lords. The character was also featured on The Howard Stern Show for several weeks.

Nihilus' popularity has led to discussions about the supposed references to the character in canon Star Wars works, such as the identity of an ancient Sith statue in Star Wars: The Rise of Skywalker, as well as the origins of the Nihil, a faction set to be the overarching antagonists of the upcoming Star Wars: The High Republic subseries. Obsidian Entertainment acknowledged their creation of Darth Nihilus and the character's popularity as a notable contribution to the Star Wars license. Menze noted in retrospect that co-creating Darth Nihilus with Avellone is a career highlight for him, and acknowledged that the character "has gone on to be bigger than the game we created".

=== Atris ===
Atris, voiced by Elizabeth Rider, is a former member of the Jedi Council and one of the Jedi largely responsible for banishing the Jedi Exile from the Jedi Order. Prior to the events of The Sith Lords, Atris had an idealistic view of the Jedi that bordered on fanaticism, believing that they were the perfect guardians of the galaxy and, as a result, did not tolerate any criticism directed towards them. She also idolized the Jedi Exile, whom she considered the ideal Jedi. However, Atris' beliefs were challenged during the events of the Mandalorian Wars and the war against Darth Malak in the first game, where the Exile left to join Revan. The sum of this drove Atris, accidentally inspired by the Exile to undertake her own rebellion, to betraying the Jedi by leaking the location of their hidden conclave, resulting in them being driven to near-extinction by Darth Nihilus. Atris then planned to rebuild the Jedi Order under her own dogmatic doctrine, and started an unethical campaign against the Sith. This included leaking information of the Jedi Exile's return to the rest of the galaxy, setting off the events of The Sith Lords.

== Other characters ==
- Trask Ulgo was a Republic soldier who appears in the first game aboard the Republic battleship Endar Spire before it is shot down over Taris by Malak's forces at the beginning of the game. He serves as a "tutorial" companion and is killed holding off Darth Bandon- allowing the player to escape. Once the player meets Darth Bandon again, they may choose a dialogue option to avenge Ulgo.
- Vrook Lamar was a Jedi Master who was on the Jedi Council that decided to exile the Jedi Exile. Vrook is one of the masters that helps retrain Revan in the first game. In the second, the Exile finds Vrook on Dantooine, where he is later killed by Kreia (if he has not already been killed by the player following the dark side path).
- Kavar was a Jedi Master who was on the Jedi Council that decided to exile the Jedi Exile. He is the main strategist of the Jedi Order, and was at one point slated to become the Exile's master before his tasks prevented it. In the second game, he is in exile on Onderon. He goes to meet with the other Jedi Masters on Dantooine, where he is killed by Kreia (if he has not already been killed by the player following the dark side path).
- Zez-Kai Ell was a Jedi Master who was on the Jedi Council that decided to exile the Jedi Exile. In the second game, he is in exile on Nar Shadaa. He left the Jedi Council after second thoughts on exiling the Exile, and believes the Jedi Order acted unfairly. He goes to meet with the other Jedi Masters on Dantooine, where he is killed by Kreia (if he has not already been killed by the player following the dark side path).
- Darth Bandon was a Sith apprentice of Malak who attacked the player, and was defeated. He appears in the first game after Calo Nord fails to slay Revan.
- Calo Nord was a bounty hunter in the first game. Nord was originally a slave, until he murdered his captors and escaped when he was sixteen years old. He is a notorious bounty hunter with a legendary fast draw who bears a grudge against Revan for escaping him, and can be fought on any of the Star Map worlds in the first game.
- Zax the Hutt was a Hutt found on Taris in the video game Star Wars: Knights of the Old Republic. Players go to him to obtain bounties.
- Ajuur the Hutt was a Hutt who worked in the Upper City cantina who ran the duelling ring on Taris. He can arrange the player's character to fight the Mandalorian death-match champion Bendak Starkiller, which can be redeemed for a bounty to Zax.
- Davik Kang was the Exchange leader of Taris, and used elite mercenaries such as Canderous Ordo and Calo Nord to carry out his dirty work. He was killed in the orbital bombardment of Taris, from which point the player has to make their escape from the planet in his ship, the Ebon Hawk.
- Saul Karath was Carth Onasi's old mentor who betrayed him to join the Sith. He appeared in the first game where he was killed by Revan onboard the Leviathan. He was voiced by Robin Sachs.
- Queen Talia is a descendant of the ancient Sith Lord Freedon Nadd and the ruler of Onderon who is at odds with her cousin Vaklu when the Exile comes to the planet. She appeared in the second game.
- Azkul is a battle-scarred mercenary who served under Malak and later settled on Dantooine, attempting to destroy the local community of Khoonda but was thwarted by the Jedi Exile. He appeared in the second game.
- General Vaklu is the power-crazed cousin of Queen Talia who seeks to overthrow his young cousin and take the royal throne.
- Chuundar is a Wookiee character in Star Wars: Knights of the Old Republic. Zaalbar was exiled for attacking Chuundar, his brother, with his claws after discovering his brother was selling fellow Wookiees into slavery. Chuundar then later took over his tribe and exiled his own father, the former Wookiee chieftain, Freyrr. Once the player comes with Zaalbar to Kashyyyk in search of a Star Map, Chuundar imprisons Zaalbar and tells Revan that he must kill their father, Freyrr, in the Shadowlands to free the Wookiee. If Revan chooses to kill Freyrr, the player leaves with the gratitude of Chuundar. Chuundar continues to enslave Wookiees and the player can no longer return to the Wookiee village. If Revan spares Freyyr, he kills Chuundar and the slavers, frees the Wookiees, frees Zaalbar, and leaves with the gratitude of Freyrr, able to return to the village on Kashyyyk at any time, although the player is unable to trade on Kashyyk any longer after Freyyr leads a Wookiee rebellion that expels the slavers from the planet.
- B4-D4: An administrative protocol droid that works for Czerka on Telos in the Outer Rim. It is possible for the player to assume control of B4-D4 if the Exile helps the Ithorians with their restoration project.
- Bendak Starkiller is a Mandalorian Neo-Crusader who was famous for his proficiency in the Taris duelling ring. Refusing to leave an opponent alive, Bendak retired from the ring after the Tarisian government outlawed death matches some ten years earlier. During the Jedi Civil War, he remained on Taris, watching matches in the cantina and hoping for the day he could return to the arena for another death match with a worthy opponent. In a dark side option, the player can duel Bendak in a death match after defeating the reigning Taris duelling champion, Twitch. The player will receive credits from Ajuur for winning the illegal death match and receive Bendak's blaster pistol, and will receive the bounty fee from Zax as well.

== Reception ==
The characters have overall been well-received, with the first Knights of the Old Republic winning the Academy of Interactive Art's "Outstanding Achievement in Character and Story Development", and both Kreia and HK-47 receiving other awards.

The characters of the Knights Of The Old Republic series have remained highly popular, often being cited as some of the best characters in both the Star Wars franchise and video games in general by both critics and fans. IGN ranked several characters from the series in their list of Top 100 Star Wars Characters: Darth Revan, Darth Malak, HK-47, Canderous Ordo, Darth Nihilus, Bastila Shan, Darth Sion, and Darth Traya placed 12th, 28th, 33rd, 52nd, 56th, 62nd, 73rd and 81st respectively. Darth Revan and Darth Malak jointly ranked fifth place in a Top 15 list of Star Wars villains by IGN's Jesse Schedeen, who remarked that "[v]isually, both Jedi are immediately memorable". The members of the Sith Triumvirate, Darth Nihilus, Darth Sion and Darth Traya, came second place in a modified supplementary list of the best Star Wars villains based on reader requests for characters left out of the original Top 15 list published by IGN. In a 2020 fan poll organized by IGN for best Star Wars characters of all time, Revan, Darth Malak and Bastila Shan placed 30th, 34th and 69th place out of 200 characters. Several characters from the series dominated GameSpot's 2019 list of "15 Great Star Wars Characters Who Came From Video Games".

== Bibliography ==
- Kane, Alex (2019). Star Wars: Knights of the Old Republic. Boss Fight Books. ISBN 978-1-940535-21-0.
