= Star Wars: Knights of the Old Republic (video game) =

2003 video game

- Developer: BioWare (Note: Ported to Mac OS X, iOS, Android and Nintendo Switch by Aspyr)
- Publisher: LucasArts (Note: Aspyr published the game's Mac OS X, iOS, Android, and Nintendo Switch versions.)
- Director: Casey Hudson
- Producer: Casey Hudson
- Designer: James Ohlen
- Programmer: David Falkner
- Artist: Derek Watts
- Writer: Drew Karpyshyn
- Composer: Jeremy Soule
- Series: Star Wars: Knights of the Old Republic
- Engine: Odyssey Engine
- Platforms: Xbox: Windows; Mac OS X; iOS; Android; Nintendo Switch
- Release: July 16, 2003: Xbox; NA: July 16, 2003; EU: September 12, 2003 Windows; NA: November 19, 2003; EU: December 5, 2003 Mac OS X; NA: September 20, 2004 iOS; WW: May 30, 2013 Android; WW: December 23, 2014 Nintendo Switch; WW: November 11, 2021
- Genre: Role-playing
- Mode: Single-player

Star Wars: Knights of the Old Republic (often abbreviated KOTOR or KotOR) is a role-playing video game developed by BioWare and published by LucasArts. The first installment of the Star Wars: Knights of the Old Republic series, it was released for the Xbox on July 16, 2003 and Windows on November 19, 2003, and it was ported to Mac OS X, iOS, and Android by Aspyr. The game is also playable on the Xbox 360, Xbox One, and Xbox Series X and Series S via backward compatibility. A Nintendo Switch version was released on November 11, 2021.

The story takes place almost 4,000 years before the formation of the Galactic Empire, where Darth Malak, a Dark Lord of the Sith, has unleashed a Sith armada against the Galactic Republic. The player character, as a Jedi, must venture to different planets in the galaxy to defeat Malak. Players choose from three character classes (Scout, Soldier or Scoundrel) and customize their characters at the beginning of the game, and engage in round-based combat against enemies. Through interacting with other characters and making plot decisions, players earn Light Side and Dark Side Points, which determines whether their character aligns with the light or dark side of the Force; these choices affect which abilities are available to the character.

Knights of the Old Republic was directed by Casey Hudson, designed by James Ohlen, and written by Drew Karpyshyn. LucasArts proposed a game tied to the film Star Wars: Episode II – Attack of the Clones, or a game set thousands of years before the prequels. The team chose the latter as they thought that they would have more creative freedom. Ed Asner, Ethan Phillips, and Jennifer Hale voiced the characters, while Jeremy Soule composed the soundtrack. Announced in 2000, the game was delayed several times before its release.

Knights of the Old Republic received critical acclaim for its characters, story, and sound. It was nominated for numerous awards and is often cited as one of the greatest video games ever made. A direct sequel, Star Wars Knights of the Old Republic II: The Sith Lords, developed by Obsidian Entertainment at BioWare's suggestion, was released in 2004. The series' story continued with the 2011 release of Star Wars: The Old Republic, a massively multiplayer online role-playing game developed by BioWare. In September 2021, a remake was announced to be in development by Aspyr for Windows and PlayStation 5; Aspyr would later be replaced by Saber Interactive in August 2022. In December 2025, Casey Hudson would separately be announced to be directing Star Wars: Fate of the Old Republic, an upcoming action role-playing game and spiritual successor to Knights of the Old Republic.

== Gameplay ==
Players choose from three basic character classes (Scout, Soldier or Scoundrel) at the beginning of the game and later choose from three Jedi subclasses (Guardian, Sentinel or Consular). Beyond class, a character has "skills" stats, tiered "feats," and later on, tiered Force powers, similar to magic spells in fantasy games. Feats and Force powers are generally unlocked upon level-up, while the player is given skill points to distribute among their skills every level.

Combat is round-based; time is divided into discrete rounds, and combatants attack and react simultaneously, although these actions are presented sequentially on-screen. The number of actions a combatant may perform each round is limited. While each round's duration is a fixed short interval of real time, the player can configure the combat system to pause at specific events or the end of each round, or set the combat system to never automatically pause, giving the illusion of real-time combat. Combat actions are calculated using Dungeons & Dragons rules, particularly the d20 System. While these are not displayed directly on the screen, the full breakdown for each action (including die rolls and modifiers) is accessible from a menu.

For much of the game, the player can have up to two companions in their party. These companions will participate in combat. They can be manually controlled by the player, or act autonomously if the player does not give them any input. Outside of combat, the companions will randomly engage the player or each other in dialogue, sometimes unlocking additional quests. They will also participate in conversations the player has with other non-player characters.

Non-combat interaction with other characters in the game world is based upon a dialogue menu system. Following each statement, the player can select from a list of menu responses. The dialogue varies based on the gender and skills of the main character.

The alignment system tracks actions and speech—from simple word choices to major plot decisions—to determine whether the player's character aligns with the light or dark side of the Force. Generosity and altruism lead to the light side, while selfish or violent actions will lead the player's character to the dark side, which will alter the character's appearance, turning their eyes yellow and their skin pale, and can affect what dialogue options are available.

In addition to the standard role-playing gameplay, there are several minigame events that come up over the course of the game. The player can participate in swoop racing to earn money, and sometimes interplanetary travel will be interrupted by enemy starfighters, which begins a minigame where the player controls a turret to shoot down the opposing starcraft. The player can also engage in a card game known as pazaak, which is similar to the game of blackjack, to gamble money.

== Synopsis ==
=== Setting ===
Knights of the Old Republic takes place approximately 4,000 years before the rise of the Galactic Empire, and covers the era following the conclusion of the Star Wars: Tales of the Jedi comics, during the earlier years of the already ancient Galactic Republic. The backstory of the game involves the Mandalorian warrior society invading the Republic in a pan-galactic conflict known as the Mandalorian Wars. The Jedi were hesitant to get involved, but a pair of renegade Jedi Knights, Revan and Malak, insisted on leading a Republic force to war. After winning the war against the Mandalorians, Revan and Malak disappeared into the Unknown Regions, returning a year later with a Sith armada and launching an invasion against the Republic themselves. Malak, Revan's apprentice, eventually succeeded his former master as Dark Lord of the Sith after Revan was seemingly killed in an ambush by the Jedi. Malak's aggression has left the Jedi scattered and vulnerable, many Jedi Knights have fallen in battle, and others have sworn allegiance to Malak.

Playable locations in Knights of the Old Republic include the planets Tatooine, Dantooine, Kashyyyk, Korriban, Manaan, Rakata Prime, and Taris; aboard the Republic cruiser Endar Spire and Saul Karath's ship Leviathan; and on the Star Forge space station. A space station near Yavin is accessible to players in the PC, Mac OS X, and mobile versions of the game and is available to Xbox players via download from Xbox Live. Travel between these locations happens aboard the freighter Ebon Hawk, which is also a playable location.

=== Characters and locations ===
Joining the player character's quest are veteran human Republic pilot Carth Onasi, the Twi'lek teenager Mission Vao and her Wookiee companion Zaalbar, the Jedi Bastila Shan, 'Gray' Jedi Jolee Bindo, utility droid T3-M4, Mandalorian mercenary Canderous Ordo, and assassin droid HK-47 if he is bought. Juhani, another Jedi, may also join the party if she is spared by the player. Republic soldier Trask Ulgo is also briefly playable during the game's opening sequence on the Endar Spire.

The game's main antagonist is Darth Malak, the Dark Lord of the Sith. Other antagonistic characters include Black Vulkar gang leader Brejik, crime boss Davik Kang, bounty hunter Calo Nord, Zaalbar's brother Chuundar, Sith apprentice Darth Bandon, Admiral Saul Karath, Sith Overseer Uthar Wynn, and Rakatan tribe leader The One. Czerka Corporation, an unscrupulous corporation operating on several planets, is an ally of Darth Malak's Sith forces. Supporting characters who assist the player's party in some capacity are Hidden Bek gang leader Gadon Thek, Jedi Masters Vandar Tokare and Zhar Lestin, game hunter Komad Fortuna, Zaalbar and Chuundar's father Freyyr, Uthar's Sith apprentice Yuthura Ban, Republic representative Roland Wann, the Rakatan tribe "The Elders," and Republic Admiral Forn Dodonna.

=== Plot ===
The game opens with the player character, whose background, gender, appearance, and name are player determined, awakening aboard a Republic ship, the Endar Spire, which is under attack by Malak's forces over the city world of Taris. Republic soldier Trask Ulgo soon arrives and informs them that they must abandon ship. Fighting their way to the escape pods, Trask and the player are soon confronted by Sith Lord Darth Bandon. With no other options, Trask sacrifices himself while the player continues to make their way to the escape pods. The player meets Carth Onasi, a skilled pilot and Republic war hero, and they escape the doomed warship.

Crashing on the surface of Taris, the player is knocked unconscious, and Carth pulls them away from the wreckage. After suffering a strange vision, the player character awakens in an abandoned apartment with Carth, who explains that Taris is under martial law by Malak's forces who are searching for the Jedi Knight Bastila Shan, known for her mastery of battle meditation, a Force technique that strengthens one's allies and weakens one's enemies during battle. Carth and the player search for her and meet new companions along the way, such as the Twi'lek street urchin Mission Vao and her Wookiee companion Zaalbar. The group finds and rescues Bastila from the Black Vulkar gang. With the help of utility droid T3-M4 and Mandalorian mercenary Canderous Ordo, the group escapes Taris aboard the star freighter Ebon Hawk, moments before Malak's fleet decimates the planet's surface in a vain effort to kill Bastila.

While taking refuge at the Jedi Academy on Dantooine, the player trains to be a Jedi, discovers a "Star Map," and learns of the "Star Forge," the probable source of Malak's military resources. The player and their companions then search planets across the galaxy—Dantooine, Manaan, Tatooine, Kashyyyk, and Korriban—for more information about the Star Forge, gaining new companions along the way such as the Cathar Jedi Juhani, assassin droid HK-47, and Jedi Jolee Bindo. After discovering three more Star Maps, the player's party is captured by Darth Malak and brought aboard his flagship, where Malak reveals that the player's character is in truth an amnesiac Darth Revan; the Jedi Council wiped their memories after their presumed death at Malak's hands in the hopes that Bastila could lead them to the Star Forge through her bond with them. Bastila sacrifices herself so the player can escape, and is subsequently turned to the dark side by Malak.

On the light side path, the player kills or redeems Bastila, defeats Malak, destroys the Star Forge, and is hailed as a savior and hero. On the dark side path, the player allies with Bastila, overthrows and kills Malak, takes control of the Star Forge for themselves, and reclaims their title as Dark Lord of the Sith.

== Production ==
=== Development ===
In July 2000, BioWare announced that they were working with LucasArts to create a Star Wars role-playing video game for the PC and next-generation consoles. Joint BioWare CEO Greg Zeschuk commented that "The opportunity to create a richly detailed new chapter in the Star Wars universe is incredibly exciting for us. We are honored to be working with the extremely talented folks at Lucas Arts, developing a role-playing game based upon one of the most high-profile licenses in the world." The game was officially unveiled as Star Wars: Knights of the Old Republic at E3 2001. At this point, the game had been in development for around six months. "Preproduction started in 2000, but the discussions started back in 1999," LucasArts' Mike Gallo said, "The first actual e-mails were in October or November of '99. That's when we first started talking to BioWare. But some really serious work finally started at the beginning of 2000." The game was originally titled Age of the Jedi, but LucasArts rejected the name and instead suggested Knights of the Old Republic.

The thing that seems to stand out is that the current game is almost exactly what we envisioned almost three years ago.

— Project director Casey Hudson in April 2003

The decision to set the game four thousand years before Star Wars: Episode I – The Phantom Menace was one of the first details about the game made known. LucasArts gave BioWare a choice of settings for the game. "LucasArts came to us and said that we could do an Episode II game," BioWare CEO Raymond Muzyka said. "Or LucasArts said we could go 4,000 years back, which is a period that's hardly been covered before." BioWare chose to set the game four thousand years before the films as it gave them greater creative freedom. They aimed to create content similar to that from the films but different enough to be a definite precursor. Concept work had to be sent to "the ranch" to be approved for use. Muzyka noted that very little of their content was rejected: "It was more like, 'Can you just make his head like this rather than like that.' So it was all very feasible. There were good suggestions made and they made the game better, so we were happy to do them. It was a good process really and I think we were pleasantly surprised how easy LucasArts was to work with." Zeschuk said that "Overall, we were really happy with the results. We felt like we had enough freedom to truly create something wonderful."

Gallo said that BioWare and LucasArts were aiming for a gameplay time of around sixty hours: "Baldur's Gate was 100 hours of gameplay or more. Baldur's Gate 2 was 200 hours, and the critical-path play through Baldur's Gate 2 was 75 hours... We're talking smaller than that [for Knights of the Old Republic], dramatically, but even if it's 60 percent smaller, then it's still 100 hours. So our goal for gameplay time is 60 hours. We have so many areas that we're building--worlds, spaceships, things like that to explore--so we have a ton of gameplay."

Project director Casey Hudson said that one of the greatest achievements and one of the greatest risks was the combat system. "We wanted to create something that combined the strategic aspects of our Baldur's Gate series and Neverwinter Nights but which presented it through fast, cinematic 3D action," Hudson said. "That required us to make something that hadn't really been done before." Creating the system was a daunting task, because of the many factors to cover, which were difficult to visualize. The developers intended to make the game have more open-ended gameplay. Gallo compared some situations to Deus Ex: "You have several ways to get through an area and you might need a character who has a specific skill to do that."

John Gallagher, the concept art director, met with Ralph McQuarrie during the game's development. The design for Revan was inspired by African tribal ornaments from the 16th to 18th centuries. Lucasfilm rejected proposals by Bioware to show the culture of the Tusken Raiders as the company did not want them developed further beyond their film appearances.

=== Technical ===
LucasArts and BioWare settled on developing Knights of the Old Republic for the PC and Xbox. The Xbox was chosen over other consoles because of BioWare's background of developing PC games and greater familiarity with the Xbox than other consoles: "We could do the things we wanted to do on the Xbox without as much effort as we'd need to do it on the PS2 or GameCube," Gallo said. Other factors included the console's recent success and the opportunity to release one of the Xbox's first RPGs. BioWare had previously developed MDK2 for the Dreamcast and PlayStation 2. Hudson said that "Having experience in developing for other consoles gave us the proper mindset for implementing this game on the Xbox, and, by comparison, the Xbox was relatively easy to develop for."

Hudson did, however, note that there were some challenges during development. One of the difficulties was in deciding how much graphical detail to provide. "Since our games generally have a lot of AI and scripting, numerous character models, and huge environments, we stress the hardware in a very different way than most games," Hudson said. This made it difficult to predict how well the game would run. The game uses the Odyssey Engine, based on the Aurora Engine (previously developed by BioWare for use in Neverwinter Nights) but completely rewritten for Knights of the Old Republic. It was highly detailed for its time: grass waves in the wind, dust blows across Tatooine and puffs of sand rise as the player walks across the seabed.

The choreography for the character animations was done using 3DS Max. Hudson noted that the differences between consoles and PCs mean that the graphics would have to be modified. "You typically play console games on a TV across the room while PC games are played on a monitor only inches away." Console games put effort into close-up action and overall render quality; PC games emphasize what can be done with high resolutions and super-sharp textures. Hudson also noted that the difference between a game controller and mouse-and-keyboard setup influenced some design decisions. The PC version features an additional location the player can visit and more NPCs, items, and weapons; these additions were later made available on the Xbox version through Xbox Live. The PC version supports higher display resolutions (up to 1600x1200) and has higher-resolution textures.

=== Character design and writing ===
Character design was a collaborative process between the game's art, writing and design teams. Concept-art director John Gallagher said that artists produced numerous variations for major characters while attempting to preserve the visual language of the films. The team did not always agree on individual designs; Gallagher opposed Darth Malak's prosthetic-jaw concept and left its development to other artists after his objections were overruled.

=== Sound ===
While the main game, graphics engine and story were developed by BioWare, LucasArts worked on the game's audio. Knights of the Old Republic contains three hundred different characters and fifteen thousand lines of speech. "One complete copy of the Knights of the Old Republic script fills up 10 5-inch binders," voice department manager Darragh O'Farrell noted. A cast of around a hundred voice actors, including Ed Asner, Raphael Sbarge, Ethan Phillips, Jennifer Hale, and Phil LaMarr was assembled. "Fortunately, with a game this size, it's easy to have an actor play a few different characters and scatter those parts throughout the game so you'll never notice it's the same actor you heard earlier," O'Farrell said.

Voice production started six months before the game's beta release. The voice production team were given the script 90% complete to work with. "There were a few changes made during recording, but most of the remaining 10 percent will be dealt with in our pickup session," O'Farrell said, "The pickup session is right at the end of the project, where we catch performance issues, tutorial lines, verbal hints, and anything else that we might have overlooked." A game the size of Knights of the Old Republic would typically take seven weeks to record; two weeks of recording all-day and all-night meant LucasArts was able to record all voices in five weeks. Actors were recorded one at a time, as the non-linear nature of the game meant it was too complicated and expensive to record more than one actor at a time.

Most of the dialogue recorded was spoken in Galactic Basic (represented by English); however, around a tenth of the script was written in Huttese. Mike Gallo used Ben Burtt's Star Wars: Galactic Phrase Book & Travel Guide to translate English into Huttese. "The key to recording alien dialogue is casting the right actor for the part," O'Farrell said, "Over the years I've had actors take to Huttese like a fish to water, but the opposite is also true. In the past I've had to line-read (when an actor copies my performance) 150-plus Huttese lines to an actor in order to make it work."

Award-winning composer Jeremy Soule was signed to compose the game's score. "It will be a Star Wars score, but it will all be original, and probably the things that will remain will be the Force themes and things like that," Gallo said. Soule was unable to write a full orchestral score for Knights of the Old Republic due to technical limitations: "At the time we only had an 8 megabit per second MIDI system. That was state of the art... I had to fool people into thinking they were hearing a full orchestra. I'd write woodwinds and drums, or woodwinds, horns and drums, or strings and drums and brass. I couldn't run the whole orchestra at once, it was impossible."

=== Release ===
When announced at E3 2001, Knights of the Old Republic was initially scheduled for a late 2002 release. An early demo was shown at E3 in 2002. In August 2002 it was announced on the game's forums that its release had been delayed: the Xbox version was to be released in spring 2003 and the PC version in summer 2003. A further delay was announced in January 2003, with both versions of the game expected to be released in fall 2003. Zeschuk attributed the delay to BioWare's focus on quality: "Our goal is to always deliver a top-notch gameplay experience, and sometimes it can be very difficult to excel in all areas. We keep working on tackling each individual issue until we feel we've accomplished something special."

The Xbox version of Knights of the Old Republic went gold on July 9, 2003, with a release date of July 16. It sold 250,000 copies in the first four days of its release, making Knights of the Old Republic the fastest-selling Xbox game at the time of its release. Following the game's release, it was announced that free downloadable content would be available through Xbox Live at the end of the year. The PC version of the game went gold on November 11, 2003, and was released on November 18. It was re-released as part of the Star Wars: The Best of PC collection in 2006.

The game was ported to Mac OS X by Aspyr and released in North America on September 20, 2004, and re-released digitally on Steam on May 14, 2012, for Mac OS X and PC. The game was released for the iPad on May 30, 2013. The iPad version includes the Yavin Station DLC that was previously released for Xbox and PC. The game was released as DRM-free download on GoG.com in October 2014.

The game was launched on Android's Google Play Store on December 22, 2014. In October 2017, Microsoft made the Xbox One console backward compatible with the Xbox version of the game, as part of a 13-game curated catalogue. On November 11, 2021, a Nintendo Switch version was released.

== Reception ==
=== Sales ===
After its release on July 16, 2003, the first Xbox shipment of Knights of the Old Republic sold out within four days on shelves, which amounted to 250,000 sales during that period. This made it the console's fastest-ever seller at the time of its launch. The game ultimately sold 270,000 copies in its initial two weeks and was ranked by The NPD Group as the #2 best-selling console game of its debut month across all platforms. It fell to the eighth position on NPD's sales chart for August and was absent by September. Worldwide sales reached 600,000 copies by October. In the United States alone, the Xbox version of Knights of the Old Republic sold 1.3 million copies and earned $44 million by July 2006. It also received a "Silver" sales award from the Entertainment and Leisure Software Publishers Association, indicating sales of at least 100,000 copies in the United Kingdom.

Following its launch in November 2003, the computer version of Knights became the third-best-selling computer game of its debut week, according to NPD. Although it dropped out of NPD's weekly top 10 by its third week, it claimed sixth place in computer game sales for November overall, and ninth for December. It returned to the weekly top 10 during the December 28 – January 3 period but was absent again on the next week's chart. NPD ultimately declared it the 17th-best-selling computer game of 2004. By August 2006, the computer version had sold 470,000 copies and earned $14.7 million in the United States alone. Edge ranked it as the country's 32nd-best-selling computer game released between January 2000 and August 2006.

Total sales of the game's Xbox and computer releases surpassed 2 million copies by February 2005 and 2.5 million by May and reached nearly 3 million by March 2006. As of 2007, Knights of the Old Republic had sold 3.2 million units.

=== Reviews ===
Reception

Aggregate scores
Aggregator	Score
GameRankings	XBOX: 94% PC: 93%
Metacritic	XBOX: 94/100; PC: 93/100 iOS: 88/100; NS: 83/100

Review scores
Publication	Score
Computer and Video Games	9/10
Eurogamer	9/10
Game Informer	9.5/10
GamePro	4.5/5
GameSpot	9.1/10
GameSpy	5/5
GamesRadar+	10/10
IGN	9.5/10
TouchArcade	5/5

Star Wars: Knights of the Old Republic received "universal acclaim" according to review aggregator Metacritic, and won numerous awards, including Game Developers Choice Awards' 2004 Game of the Year, and the BAFTA Games Awards' best Xbox game of the year. GameSpot named it the best Xbox game of July 2003, and best computer game of November 2003.

During the 7th Annual Interactive Achievement Awards, the Academy of Interactive Arts and Sciences awarded Knights of the Old Republic with "Outstanding Achievement in Character or Story Development", "Console Role-Playing Game of the Year", and "Computer Role-Playing Game of the Year"; it was also nominated for seven other awards including "Console Game of the Year", "Computer Game of the Year", and "Game of the Year".

Knights of the Old Republic was named game of the year by several publications, including IGN, Computer Gaming World, PC Gamer, GMR, The Game Developers Choice Awards, Xbox Magazine, and G4. Computer Games Magazine named it the best computer game of 2003, and presented it with awards for "Best Original Music" and "Best Writing." The editors wrote, "The elegance and accessibility that BioWare made part-and-parcel of this game should be the future standard for this genre." IGN gave KotOR additional awards in Best Sound (Xbox category), Best Story (PC category), Xbox RPG of the Year 2003, PC RPG of the Year 2003, Xbox Game of the Year 2003, PC Game of the Year 2003, and Overall Game of the Year 2003 across all platforms. At the 2004 Game Developers Choice Awards, HK-47 won the category of "Original Game Character of the Year."

IGN listed KotOR at #27 on its 2007 list of the Top 100 Games of All-Time and at #3 on its list of Best games of the Decade (2000–2009), beaten by Shadow of the Colossus and Half-Life 2. In 2007, the plot twist in KotOR was ranked number two in Game Informer's list of the top ten video game plot twists of all time and number 10 on ScrewAttack's "Top 10 OMGWTF Moments." The Los Angeles Times listed Knights of the Old Republic as one of the most influential works of the Star Wars Expanded Universe. In 2010, Game Informer named the game the 54th best game on their Top 200 Games of All Time list. In November 2012, Time named it one of the 100 greatest video games of all time.

== Legacy ==
The game is part of Xbox Platinum Series/Classics for sales in excess of 1 million units.

Elements from Knights of the Old Republic have been referenced by later Star Wars media. Darth Revan was set to appear in the third season of Star Wars: The Clone Wars in the episode "Ghosts of Mortis" as an influence to the Son, an embodiment of the dark side of the Force. The scene was ultimately cut before it was fully animated; the partially-completed scene was later released in 2021. In early 2017, plot elements from the game were referenced by the animated television series Star Wars Rebels, including the Mandalorian Wars and the ancient Sith planet Malachor. In the official book guide to the 2019 film Star Wars: The Rise of Skywalker, one of the legions of Sith troopers of Palpatine's Final Order is named after Darth Revan. LEGO produced a Darth Revan minifigure, which was free with qualifying LEGO Star Wars purchases as a part of the company's 2014 "May the Fourth" promotion. In April 2019, Kathleen Kennedy was asked by MTV News about a potential adaptation of Knights of the Old Republic and stated, "Yes, we are developing something to look at. Right now, I have no idea where things might fall".

=== Sequels ===
A direct sequel, Star Wars Knights of the Old Republic II: The Sith Lords, developed by Obsidian Entertainment and published by LucasArts, was released in 2004. Many of the characters, locations and concepts introduced in Knights of the Old Republic and The Sith Lords went on to play major roles in BioWare's first Massively multiplayer online role-playing game (MMORPG), Star Wars: The Old Republic (2011). The game had one million subscribers within three days of its launch and earned a billion dollars in lifetime revenue as of 2019. .

=== Remake ===
In September 2021, Knights of the Old Republic — Remake, a remake, was announced to be in development by Aspyr for Windows and PlayStation 5. It will be a timed console exclusive for PlayStation 5 before releasing on other platforms. On the remake's development, lead producer Ryan Treadwell wrote, "We're rebuilding it from the ground up with the latest tech to match the groundbreaking standard of innovation established by the original, all while staying true to its revered story". Several individuals who worked on the original game are returning for the remake, such as former BioWare developers and Jennifer Hale (reprising her role of Bastila). In August 2022, Saber Interactive's European studios officially took over as leading the development of the game from Aspyr.

=== Spiritual successor ===
In December 2025, Star Wars: Fate of the Old Republic was announced as in development by Arcanaut Studios and will be published by Lucasfilm Games. The studio considers the action role-playing game a spiritual successor rather than a direct sequel or continuation of the Knights of the Old Republic series. The project is led by Arcanaut's game director Casey Hudson, the director of Knights of the Old Republic.

== See also ==
- List of Star Wars video games

== Bibliography ==
- Kane, Alex (2019). Star Wars: Knights of the Old Republic. Boss Fight Books. ISBN 978-1-940535-21-0.
