= Star Wars: Knights of the Old Republic =

Video game series

- Genres: Action role-playing, Massively multiplayer online role-playing
- Developers: BioWare; Obsidian Entertainment; Saber Interactive; Broadsword Online Studios
- Publishers: Microsoft Game Studios; LucasArts; Aspyr; Electronic Arts
- Creators: Drew Karpyshyn, James Ohlen
- Platforms: Xbox; Windows; Mac OS X; iOS; Android; Linux; Nintendo Switch
- First release: Star Wars: Knights of the Old Republic; July 15, 2003
- Latest release: Star Wars: The Old Republic - Legacy of the Sith; February 15, 2022
- Parent series: Star Wars video games

Star Wars: Knights of the Old Republic (KOTOR) is a media franchise of role-playing video games created and developed by BioWare. Games have been released on the original Xbox, Windows, OS X, iOS, Android and Nintendo Switch. The franchise takes place in the fictional universe of Star Wars by George Lucas.

The first game, and subsequent massively multiplayer online role-playing game series, was developed by BioWare while the second was done by Obsidian Entertainment per LucasArts' request. All were published by LucasArts. The video game series is based on an earlier comic book series; the franchise includes a subsequent new comic book series. Both comic series were published by Dark Horse Comics and act as prequels to the video games.

== Gameplay ==
The game's system is based on Wizards of the Coast's Star Wars Roleplaying Game, which is based on the d20 role-playing game system derived from the Third Edition Dungeons & Dragons rules. Combat is round-based; time is divided into discrete rounds, and combatants attack and react simultaneously. However, the number of actions a combatant may perform each round is limited. While each round's duration is a fixed short interval of real time, the player can configure the combat system to pause at specific events or at the end of each round.

=== Alignment system ===
The alignment system tracks actions and speech – from simple word choice to major plot decisions – to determine whether the player's character aligns with the light or dark side of the Force. In the first game, the player's speech and actions have no effect on their teammates. However, the player has influence over their companions in The Sith Lords, the player's actions determining not only what side the player is on, but their teammates as well. The influence the player has on another character can be minor, from converting a character from the dark side to the light, to something as major as teaching them the ways of the Jedi themselves. Influence can be lost, however, if the player makes an action inconsistent with past decisions, causing the player to pay very close attention before reacting in any way. The series includes "Gray Jedi" who tend to follow their own path as far as the Force is concerned rather than obeying the light or dark side.

=== Lightsabers ===
The games in the series offer extensive lightsaber customization including crystal colors and blade styles. The developers of the series "fought" to expand the number of lightsaber colors. The game includes the ubiquitous colors blue and green but also colors such as orange and yellow. Danny Paez, for Inverse, commented that "KOTOR's spectrum of lightsaber crystals led to gamers obsessing over collecting them all to design the lightsaber of their dreams. This led to fans going out of their way to explore every nook and cranny of the games".

== Synopsis ==
=== Plot ===
Four thousand years prior to the Star Wars films, (Note: KOTOR I is set in 3956 BBY (3956 years before the Battle of Yavin in which the first Death Star was destroyed.) KOTOR II: The Sith Lords is set 5 years later. The Old Republic is set 300 years after KOTOR I & II. The comic series starts 8 years before the games.) Darth Malak – Darth Revan's apprentice – has unleashed a Sith armada against the Republic. Many Jedi, scattered and left vulnerable by Malak's aggression, die in battle while others swear loyalty and allegiance to Malak. The game opens with the player's character awakening aboard a doomed Republic capital ship with no recollection of their past. After escaping the ship and crash-landing on Taris, the player gradually gathers companions and pieces together their past while attempting to stop Malak's forces. To accomplish this, the main character and their companions search for Star Maps that together reveal the location of the Star Forge, an ancient space station that creates massive amounts of material for Malak.

The main character's actions and speech influence whether they align with the light or dark side of the Force. Depending on the character's alignment, they eventually reach the Star Forge either to defeat the Sith (the light-side path) or to usurp control of the Sith from Malak (the dark side path). A light-aligned character and their companions are hailed as saviors and heroes; a dark side character stands before the remaining Sith forces as the new Sith Lord.

The Sith Lords takes place five years after the events of Knights of the Old Republic, in a time when the Jedi have been nearly exterminated by the Sith. The player's character is a former Jedi Knight exiled from the Jedi Order, referred to as "the Exile" or "Jedi Exile". During the Mandalorian Wars, the Exile served under Revan who ordered the activation of a devastating gravitational superweapon – the Mass Shadow Generator – that caused so many deaths to the point where they stripped themself of all connections to the Force unconsciously to save themself, and was removed from the Jedi Order. Throughout the game, the player's character restores a connection to the Force while, with the help of their new companions, try to stop the Sith. Unlike the previous game where the player's actions affect the fate of the galaxy, here, the chosen actions affect only the planets the player can visit. The player can choose to either help or hinder the Republic's attempt to rebuild these planets. In the end, if the character is light-aligned, the Mass Shadow Generator is activated and destroys Malachor V and the Exile goes into unknown space to find Revan. A dark-aligned character, however, takes over the Sith academy on Malachor V and the Mass Shadow Generator is destroyed.

The Old Republic takes place 300 years after the previous two games, shortly after the establishment of a tenuous peace between the re-emergent Sith Empire and the Galactic Republic. The Jedi are held responsible for the success of the Sith and chose to relocate from Coruscant to Tython, where the Jedi Order had been initially founded, to seek guidance from the Force. The Sith control Korriban, where they re-established a Sith Academy. The game begins as new conflicts arise.

=== Locations ===
Several new planets make appearances in the series as major locations. These include, for example, Dantooine and Korriban, the locations for the Jedi Academy and the Sith Academy, respectively; aboard the Star Forge space station where the final battle between master and apprentice takes place in KotOR; and war-ravaged Telos and its orbiting Citadel Station. Travel between locations happens aboard the freighter Ebon Hawk, which is also a playable location, though no combat takes place on board, except for three instances in KotOR 2 where you have to fight off Sith attackers, the character Visas Marr, and members of the Red Eclipse slavers. A space station near Yavin is also playable location in the PC version of KotOR and is available to Xbox players via download from Xbox Live. In The Old Republic, players have access to even more planets, like Ord Mantell, Nal Hutta, Balmorra, Alderaan, Tatooine, Dromund Kaas, Taris, Belsavis, Voss, Hoth, Corellia, Ilum and Quesh, and the moon Nar Shaddaa.

== Video games ==
List of games
Game	Details
Star Wars: Knights of the Old Republic Original release dates: NA: 16 July 2003; EU: 12 September 2003	Release years by system: 2003 · Windows, Xbox; 2004 · macOS; 2013 · iOS; 2014 · Android; 2021 · Switch
Star Wars: Knights of the Old Republic Original release dates: NA: 16 July 2003; EU: 12 September 2003	Notes: Action role-playing game set millennia before The Phantom Menace.; Developed by BioWare, published by LucasArts, ported to macOS by Aspyr.
Star Wars Knights of the Old Republic II: The Sith Lords Original release dates: NA: 12 December 2004; EU: 11 February 2005; AU: 15 February 2005	Release years by system: 2004 · Xbox; 2005 · Windows; 2015 · macOS; 2020 · Android, iOS; 2022 · Switch
Star Wars Knights of the Old Republic II: The Sith Lords Original release dates: NA: 12 December 2004; EU: 11 February 2005; AU: 15 February 2005	Notes: Action role-playing game and direct sequel to Knights of the Old Republic.; Developed by Obsidian Entertainment, published by LucasArts, ported to macOS by Aspyr.
Star Wars Knights of the Old Republic III Cancellation date: 2006	Proposed system release: 2006 · Windows, Xbox 360
Star Wars Knights of the Old Republic III Cancellation date: 2006	Notes: Was to be a direct sequel to Knights of the Old Republic II.; Would have been published by LucasArts.; Canceled in favor of what would become The Old Republic.
Star Wars: The Old Republic: NA: 20 December 2011; EU: 20 December 2011; AU: 1 March 2012; – Windows (Can be accessed via Bootcamp; Crossover)	Notes: Massively multiplayer online role-playing game and indirect sequel to Knights of the Old Republic and Knights of the Old Republic II.; Developed by BioWare, published by Electronic Arts, currently maintained by Broadsword Online Games.; Received eight expansions: Rise of the Hutt Cartel, Galactic Starfighter, Galactic Strongholds, Shadow of Revan, Knights of the Fallen Empire, Knights of the Eternal Throne, Onslaught, and Legacy of the Sith.
Remake of Star Wars: Knights of the Old Republic TBA – PlayStation 5, Windows	Notes: Action role-playing game and remake of Knights of the Old Republic.; Being developed and published by Saber Interactive. Development was started by Aspyr.; To be a PlayStation 5 exclusive for an unknown duration before being released for other platforms.

Release timeline Main series in bold
2003	Knights of the Old Republic
2004	Knights of the Old Republic II
2005
2006
2007
2008
2009
2010
2011	The Old Republic
2012
2013	The Old Republic: Rise of the Hutt Cartel
2014	The Old Republic: Shadow of Revan
2015	The Old Republic: Knights of the Fallen Empire
2016	The Old Republic: Knights of the Eternal Throne
2017
2018
2019	The Old Republic: Onslaught
2020
2021
2022	The Old Republic: Legacy of the Sith
2023
2024
2025
TBA	Remake of Knights of the Old Republic

=== Original series ===
==== Star Wars: Knights of the Old Republic ====
Star Wars: Knights of the Old Republic (KotOR) is the first installment in the Knights of the Old Republic series. KotOR is the first role-playing video game set in the Star Wars universe. The game was released on the Xbox on July 15, 2003, in North America and on September 12, 2003, in Europe. The PC version was released on November 19, 2003, in North America and on December 5, 2003, in Europe. The iOS version was released on May 30, 2013, and an Android release followed on December 28, 2014. The Nintendo Switch version was released on November 11, 2021.

==== Star Wars Knights of the Old Republic II: The Sith Lords ====
Star Wars Knights of the Old Republic II: The Sith Lords (KotOR II) is the second installment in the video game franchise. The game was released on the Xbox in North America on December 6, 2004, in Europe on February 11, 2005, and in Australia on February 15, 2005. The PC version was released in North America on February 8, 2005, and in Europe on February 11, 2005. BioWare declined to develop the sequel within the 14-to-16-month production period sought by LucasArts, and the project was instead given to the newly founded Obsidian Entertainment.

In addition to technical changes – such as more combat animation and interface scaling – The Sith Lords includes several drastic changes from the original game's features. As mentioned earlier in the gameplay section, the player's actions now affect not only the player themselves but their teammates as well. The player can also teach some teammates the ways of the Jedi. The player also has more diversity when upgrading items, and can even create certain items, such as computer spikes and explosives, themselves.

In a similar way the player's actions and alignment with the light or dark side affects their teammates (both a teammate's alignment and who teams with the player in the first place), gender is also a factor when it comes to companionships and gameplay in general. In addition the appearance (due to choices) also affects your teammates. For example, choosing a female character teams the player with Mical the Disciple, while being male teams the player with Brianna the Handmaiden.

==== Star Wars: Knights of the Old Republic III (cancelled) ====
Former LucasArts producer Mike Gallo later recalled that at least two distinct Knights of the Old Republic III pitches had existed after the release of The Sith Lords, one developed internally at LucasArts and another by Obsidian.

In 2003, LucasArts cancelled the Proteus console MMOG project during its design phase. The game was intended to be an in-house sibling to Star Wars Galaxies. Upon its cancellation, the Proteus project's team and elements of its designs were applied to developing Star Wars: Knights of the Old Republic 3. According to designer John Stafford, the team "wrote a story, designed most of the environments/worlds, and many of the quests, characters, and items." The game was cancelled as part of cuts initiated in 2004 aimed at positioning LucasArts for future success. Concept art from the cancelled Knights of the Old Republic 3 project was published in the book Rogue Leaders: The Story of LucasArts (2008); the artwork includes depictions of Taloraan, Rodia, and a Mandalorian city, as well as a Coruscant vehicle and a new character named Naresha.

Obsidian Entertainment separately developed its own proposal for a third game. According to Chris Avellone, Obsidian's version entered pre-production but was never greenlit by LucasArts. It would have continued with the Jedi Exile as the player character, following Revan's path into the distant reaches of the galaxy and confronting ancient "true Sith" whose existence had been foreshadowed in The Sith Lords. The game would have retained the Ebon Hawk and returning companions T3-M4 and HK-47. Avellone said Obsidian repeatedly pitched the project without success; programmer Dan Spitzley suggested that the transition to the Xbox 360 and PlayStation 3 generation, and the resulting need for new technology, may also have made the project more expensive to pursue.

==== Star Wars: The Old Republic ====
Star Wars: The Old Republic (also known as SWTOR) was released for the Microsoft Windows platform on December 13, 2011, in North America and Europe, and released in Australia on March 1, 2012. It was first confirmed by Electronic Arts CEO John Riccitiello at E3 2008. The game was developed by BioWare, who developed the first Knights of the Old Republic game. It takes place 300 years after the first two installments, as new conflicts arise between the Republic and the Sith Empire. Players participate in a period of time known as the Cold War in the galaxy, after the First Great Galactic War, which leads into events in the Second Great Galactic War.

The game has received six storyline expansions and two smaller add-ons focusing on new gameplay mechanics.

Star Wars: The Old Republic expansions
Game	Launch	Description
Storylines
Rise of the Hutt Cartel	April 14, 2013	It is centered on the rising threat of the Hutt Cartel, which has arisen to challenge the Galactic Republic and the Sith Empire for control of the galaxy. The level cap was raised to 55, with the leveling from 50 onwards centered on the new planet Makeb.
Shadow of Revan	December 9, 2014	It is centered on the Order of Revan, an army seeking to establish a new galactic rule. It is led by the reborn Revan, who is depicted in Shadow of Revan as a canonical male character. The campaign raised the level cap to 60, and takes place on two new worlds: Rishi, a tropical pirate haven on the edge of the galaxy, and Yavin 4 (which first appeared in the original Star Wars film), home of an ancient Sith warrior sect called the Massassi.
Knights of the Fallen Empire	October 27, 2015	The largest expansion to The Old Republic, it features a renewed focus on cinematic storytelling, as well as new planets, new companions, and a dynamic story affected by player choices, introducing the new threat of the Eternal Empire and its leader, the Emperor of the Eternal Throne. At Level 60, the player's character is frozen in carbonite and awakens five years later to find that the Eternal Empire has become the dominant force in the galaxy. The player becomes the "Outlander" and builds an alliance to wage war against the Eternal Empire.
Knights of the Eternal Throne	December 2, 2016	Set in the aftermath of the events of Fallen Empire, the Outlander leads the Alliance against the forces of Empress Vaylin. Eternal Throne also features two new gameplay features, Galactic Command and Uprisings, allowing the player to participate in new battles and expand their influence across the galaxy.
Onslaught	October 22, 2019	It focuses on the reignited war between the Republic and Sith Empire; the player chooses to support one side. It also introduces the Nautolans as a playable species.
Legacy of the Sith	February 15, 2022	It focuses on the return of Darth Malgus and the rise of a new cult of dark lords. It was released on February 15, 2022, in celebration of The Old Republic's 10th anniversary.
Gameplay mechanics
Galactic Starfighter	February 4, 2014	Introduced 12v12 space-based PvP combat on two maps, with 2 'capture-the-flag' combat missions.
Galactic Strongholds	October 14, 2014	Introduced player housing and flagships for guilds.

=== Remake ===
In September 2021, Knights of the Old Republic — Remake, a graphically updated remake of the original game, was announced as in development by Aspyr in collaboration with Sony Interactive Entertainment, for PlayStation 5. It will be a timed console exclusive for PlayStation 5 before releasing on other platforms. On the remake's development, lead producer Ryan Treadwell wrote: "We're rebuilding it from the ground up with the latest tech to match the groundbreaking standard of innovation established by the original, all while staying true to its revered story". Several individuals who worked on the original game are returning for the remake, such as former BioWare developers and Jennifer Hale (reprising her role of Bastila). However, certain original cast members have since been deceased or will not be returning, such as Tom Kane who has retired for medical reasons. Little information was otherwise revealed about the project.

In July 2022, Bloomberg reported that the remake has been "delayed indefinitely" after Aspyr "abruptly fired the game's art director and design director". Bloomberg stated that this occurred after the vertical slice demo was shown to production partners Sony and Lucasfilm – Aspyr's studio heads put the project on hold as the demo gameplay "wasn't where they wanted it to be [...], according to two people who were in the meeting". The remake was speculated not be released until 2025, per Bloomberg's sources, instead of its intended 2022 release, though neither release date ultimately came to pass. In August 2022, Aspyr was reportedly removed from the project and replaced by Saber Interactive, which along with Aspyr is owned by Embracer Group. In September 2023, Kotaku reported that 2021 teaser trailer for the remake has been "hidden" on the "official YouTube channel" and the majority of social media posts "from the original 2021 PlayStation Showcase had also been deleted" which sparked speculation on the status of the remake. In response, Sony stated that the delisting occurred because the music license expired. By February 2024, Embracer Group planned to sell off Saber in a US$500 million deal. Saber is anticipated to continue developing Knights of the Old Republic - Remake as a privately owned firm. Mad Head Games, which previously worked on Hellraiser: Revival, is developing the game under Saber.

=== Related games ===
==== Star Wars: Galaxy of Heroes ====
Select characters from the series have also made a non-canon appearance in the mobile turn-based role-playing game Star Wars: Galaxy of Heroes, released on iOS and Android in November 2015, also published by Electronic Arts. While most of the game's playable characters come from the mainstream Star Wars continuity that Lucasfilm established under the Walt Disney Company, several characters from the Knights of the Old Republic series are also included, since Electronic Arts is responsible for both Heroes and Knights.

==== Star Wars: Fate of the Old Republic ====
In December 2025, the action role-playing game Star Wars: Fate of the Old Republic was announced as in development by Arcanaut Studios and will be published by Lucasfilm Games. The studio considers the game a spiritual successor rather than a direct sequel or continuation of the Knights of the Old Republic series, aiming to "[honor] that legacy" by creating a similar narrative-focused and decision-based role-playing game. The project is led by Arcanaut's game director Casey Hudson.

== Comics ==
The first issue of the Star Wars: Knights of the Old Republic (2006) comic book series based on the game

The original Star Wars: Tales of the Jedi (and specifically Star Wars: Tales of the Jedi - Knights of the Old Republic) comic book series preceded these games, first published in 1993 by Dark Horse Comics. They formed the basis for the game setting, as well as inspiration for the game characters and story.

The second comic series, Star Wars: Knights of the Old Republic, takes place around 3964 BBY, approximately eight years prior to the story of the video game series, and focuses on Zayne Carrick, a Padawan framed for the murder of his fellow Padawans by his masters, who are members of a mysterious Jedi Covenant. The series was written by John Jackson Miller with art by Brian Ching. It was published monthly from March 1, 2006, to February 17, 2010, by Mike Richardson and Dark Horse Comics.

A webcomic series, Star Wars: The Old Republic: Threat of Peace, was written by game developer Robert Chestney with art by Alex Sanchez. The story spans ten years from the signing of the Treaty of Coruscant to the events that start the game. The comic was produced by Dark Horse and released bi-monthly from February 27, 2009, to March 2010. It is separated into three acts: Act 1: Treaty of Coruscant, Act 2: New Galactic Order and Act 3: Uncertain Surrender.

A second webcomic series, The Old Republic: Blood of the Empire, was written by Alexander Freed, with art by David Ross, and follows the story of a Sith apprentice on a dangerous secret mission set 25 years before the Treaty of Coruscant. The comic was produced by Dark Horse and released weekly from April 23, 2010, to August 13, 2010. It is separated into three acts: Act 1: Shades of the Sith, Act 2: The Broken World and Act 3: Burn the Future.

Threat of Peace and Blood of the Empire were published in printed format from July 7 to December 2, 2010. A third series by Alexander Freed and David Ross, Star Wars: The Old Republic: The Lost Suns, was released, in printed form, monthly from June 8 to October 12, 2011, by Dark Horse. It follows Satele Shan's son Theron Shan.

== Novels ==
A 256-page novel called Star Wars: The Old Republic: Deceived was released by Del Rey on March 22, 2011. Written by Paul S. Kemp, it tells of Darth Malgus, the Sith Lord responsible for the sacking of Coruscant. Another novel written by Sean Williams called Star Wars: The Old Republic: Fatal Alliance was published on July 21, 2010. Drew Karpyshyn wrote a novel, Star Wars: The Old Republic: Revan, published on November 15, 2011. It features Revan, revealing his fate after the Knights of the Old Republic game. Karpyshyn wrote another novel, Star Wars: The Old Republic: Annihilation, that was released on November 13, 2012.

== Films ==
=== Cinematic trailers ===
Bioware released six short films as cinematic trailers for The Old Republic and its expansion packs.

=== Film adaptation ===
In April 2019, Kathleen Kennedy was asked by MTV News about a potential Knights of the Old Republic adaptation and stated, "Yes, we are developing something to look at. Right now, I have no idea where things might fall". The following month, BuzzFeed News reported that Laeta Kalogridis had been hired in the spring of 2018 to write a film based on the 2003 video game, and that she was close to completing the first script of a potential trilogy. Representatives refused to comment, and nothing has been reported since.

== Reception ==
The general critical response of Knights of the Old Republic was overwhelmingly positive. KotOR won numerous awards, including Game Developers Choice Awards' game of the year, BAFTA Games Awards' best Xbox game of the year, and Interactive Achievement Awards for best console RPG and best computer RPG. KotOR has seen success as the game of the year from many sources including IGN, GameSpot, Computer Gaming World, PC Gamer, GMR Magazine, The Game Developers Choice Awards, Xbox Magazine, and G4TV. Interactive Achievement Awards awarded it for best story and best character development. IGN gave KotOR additional awards in Best Sound (Xbox category), Best Story (PC category), Xbox RPG Game of the Year 2003, PC RPG Game of the Year 2003, Xbox Game of the Year 2003, PC Game of the Year 2003, and Overall Game of the Year 2003 across all platforms. G4TV's game review show X-Play picked KotOR as the second "best game ever" since the show began. The game is also part of the Xbox Platinum Series/Classics for sales in excess of one million units. In 2007, a story twist within the game was ranked number two in Game Informer's list of the top ten video game twists of all time.

The Sith Lords was generally well received by fans and critics alike. Mirroring the success of the first game, The Sith Lords has garnered over thirty-five "Game of the Year" awards. The game received high marks from major reviewers - 8.5/10 from GameSpot, 4.5/5 from Gamespy and 93% from IGN. Based on 30 professional reviews, Metacritic gave the game an average rating of 85 out of 100, compared 93 for Knights of the Old Republic. The game was however criticized for being incomplete due to a rushed deadline.

The Old Republic has received generally positive reviews from critics, with a score of 85 on Metacritic and an 83.87% on GameRankings. G4TV gave a review of 5/5 and praised the game for "Top notch music and voice acting" and "hundreds of hours of content." PC Gamer gave a 93/100, praising the story, voice acting, and the amount of content available. Gamespy gave a review of 4/5, praising the story lines and companion system but criticising the "standard kill and fetch" quests. GameSpot gave the game 8.0/10, saying "[The Old Republic] isn't the next step in online role-playing games. Instead, it's a highly entertaining refinement of what has come before it." GamesRadar gave the game 8/10 calling it "an extremely satisfying experience that sets the stage for a bright future". The game has received a 9.0/10 "Amazing" rating from IGN.
