= Revan =

Fictional Star Wars character

- Star Wars character
- Darth Revan in Star Wars: Knights of the Old Republic
- First appearance: Star Wars: Knights of the Old Republic (2003)
- Created by: BioWare
- Voiced by: Rino Romano (male, Knights of the Old Republic); Charity James (female, Knights of the Old Republic); Jeff Bennett (The Old Republic)

In-universe information
- Alias: Darth Revan
- Species: Human
- Occupation: Jedi Knight; Dark Lord of the Sith
- Affiliation: Jedi Order; Sith Empire; Galactic Republic
- Apprentice: Darth Malak

Revan is a fictional character in the Star Wars franchise, first appearing as the player character of BioWare's 2003 role-playing video game Star Wars: Knights of the Old Republic. The player character is introduced as an amnesiac Republic soldier whose name, gender, appearance, and class are chosen by the player. During the story, the character's true identity is revealed to be Darth Revan, a former Jedi and Sith Lord whose memories were erased by the Jedi after an attempted capture. Depending on the player's choices, Revan either rejects the Sith and defeats Darth Malak, or reclaims the title of Dark Lord of the Sith.

Although Revan is customizable in Knights of the Old Republic, later works in the non-canonical Star Wars Legends continuity depict the character as a light-sided human male who is romantically linked to Bastila Shan. Revan appears or is referenced in several later Star Wars works, most notably the massively multiplayer online role-playing game (MMO) Star Wars: The Old Republic, set approximately 300 years after the earlier games. Revan serves as the central antagonistic figure of the 2014 expansion Shadow of Revan for The Old Republic, which frames the story around the player confronting Revan and his sect of followers known as the Revanites.

Commentary on Revan often focuses on the character's dual function as both a customizable player character and a pre-existing figure within the story, with the reveal of the player character being Revan cited as one of the game's defining story moments. Revan has been discussed by developers and critics for the identity reveal in Knights of the Old Republic; the character's function as both the player's avatar and former villain; Darth Revan's masked visual design; and the character's continuing popularity among Star Wars fandom.

== Development ==
Revan was created by BioWare for Star Wars: Knights of the Old Republic, which was developed in collaboration with LucasArts and released in 2003. The game is set thousands of years before the Star Wars films, which allowed BioWare to create new characters and conflicts while still using the franchise's conflict between the light and dark sides of the Force. Revan was designed as the game's player character and as the hidden identity behind Darth Revan, the Sith Lord whose past actions drive much of the game's story.

Alex Kane's book Star Wars: Knights of the Old Republic describes the revelation of Revan's identity as one of the central reasons the game continued to be discussed after release. Kane's account draws on interviews with several members of the game's development team, including James Ohlen, Drew Karpyshyn, John Gallagher, Jennifer Hale, and other figures involved in the game's production.

When developing The Sith Lords, Obsidian Entertainment deliberately reduced Revan's direct presence so that the sequel could focus on new characters, a decision lead designer Chris Avellone later questioned. Avellone said the game was nevertheless written to suggest that Revan had been acting with a broader strategy than was apparent in the original game: clues concerning infrastructure Revan had chosen not to destroy were intended to imply that the character had perceived a larger threat beyond the Jedi Civil War. Avellone characterized Revan as an even more capable strategist than the first game had revealed. Obsidian intended to develop this thread further in its proposed third game, in which the Jedi Exile would have followed Revan's path into the distant reaches of the galaxy and uncover the ancient Sith threat that Revan had been preparing to confront.

=== Character design ===
Darth Revan's masked Sith appearance was developed separately from the customizable player character. Concept-art director John Gallagher described Revan’s appearance as a collaborative design. James Ohlen asked for a figure who did not resemble an ordinary Jedi; Gallagher drew on Mandalorian and Boba Fett imagery and used the mask to make Revan unreadable. Kane quotes Ohlen describing Darth Revan as both a vessel for the player and the basis of the plot twist. Ohlen and Drew Karpyshyn cited The Sixth Sense as a model for planting enough clues that the revelation would feel prepared even when some players anticipated it.

=== Player character ===
In Knights of the Old Republic, the player initially defines Revan through choices of gender, face, name, and class, with much of the game's dialogue written to accommodate those choices. Rino Romano provides the voice for the male version of Revan, while Charity James provides the voice for the female version.

Revan differs from a wholly blank player avatar because the character has a fixed hidden past that predates the player's control, gives the character a hidden biography that the player did not choose. James Ohlen described Darth Revan as "essentially the player", serving as both a vessel for the player and the basis of the game's central plot twist. The team structured the story so that players would encounter clues about Revan's past before Darth Malak states the truth directly. Ohlen cited twist-driven films such as The Sixth Sense and Fight Club as influences on the game's use of a concealed identity, while Karpyshyn said the writers wanted enough foreshadowing for the reveal to feel earned rather than arbitrary.

== Appearances ==
=== In Star Wars Knights of the Old Republic ===
Revan is the main protagonist and player character of Star Wars: Knights of the Old Republic. The game begins after Darth Malak, Revan's former apprentice, has taken control of the Sith fleet and is waging war against the Galactic Republic. The player character awakens aboard the Republic ship Endar Spire with no memory of their past. After escaping to the planet Taris, the player gradually assembles companions and joins the search for Star Maps leading to the Star Forge, an ancient space station used by the Sith to build their armada.

The game later reveals that the player character is Revan, a former Jedi who, with Malak, had left the Jedi Order to fight in the Mandalorian Wars. After the war, Revan and Malak returned as Sith and attacked the Republic. When the Jedi attempted to capture Revan, Malak betrayed his master by firing on Revan's ship. Revan survived, and the Jedi Council erased Revan's memories, creating a new identity that could be used to locate the Star Forge and defeat Malak.

After Malak reveals Revan's identity, the player's choices determine how Revan responds. If the player follows the light side, Revan rejects the Sith identity, defeats Malak, and destroys the Star Forge. If the player follows the dark side, Revan defeats Malak and resumes control of the Sith. Later Star Wars Legends continuity adopts the light-side ending, in which Revan is male, remains loyal to the Republic, destroys the Star Forge, and develops a romantic relationship with Bastila Shan.

=== In Star Wars Knights of the Old Republic II: The Sith Lords ===
Revan does not physically appear in Star Wars Knights of the Old Republic II: The Sith Lords, but the character's disappearance is central to the sequel's backstory. The game establishes that, after defeating Malak, Revan remembered a threat beyond known space and left the Republic to confront it. The Jedi Exile, the player character of The Sith Lords, had previously served under Revan during the Mandalorian Wars, and dialogue with characters such as Canderous Ordo and Kreia varies according to the player's chosen account of Revan's alignment and gender. The Jedi Exile also encounters a silent apparition of Darth Revan inside the tomb of Ludo Kressh on Korriban.

=== The Old Republic ===
Revan appears in Star Wars: The Old Republic after a team of Republic heroes manages to rescue him from the Emperor's Maelstrom Prison with the help of the ghost of the Jedi Exile. It is revealed that Revan was kept alive for centuries as a prisoner by the Emperor to channel Revan's strength in the Force. Revan's link with the Emperor was two-way, however, allowing them to keep the Emperor's darker urges in check, thereby preventing the Emperor from unleashing his full power upon the galaxy before the Republic and Jedi Order had grown enough again to be able to stand a chance against the Sith Empire. Though thankful to the Republic for rescuing them, having fallen the Dark side again, Revan decides to fight the Emperor on their own terms and takes control of a Rakatan installation called "The Foundry", engineering a droid army (led by HK-47) programmed to identify and eliminate any target with Sith DNA, which not only included Dark Lords of the Sith but also the majority of citizens of the Empire. Revan's plan is thwarted when a group of Imperials manages to infiltrate the Foundry and destroy the droid army and HK-47 before confronting Revan. After a vicious battle, Revan is defeated but disappears before a killing blow can be delivered.

Revan appears again in the "Legacy of Rakata Prime" flashpoint as the mastermind behind the conspiracy in the "Forged Alliances" plotline, and as the primary antagonist of the fourth digital expansion to The Old Republic, entitled Shadow of Revan, in which they return to destroy both the Republic and Empire, leading a group of followers known as the Order of Revan or "Revanites", into infiltrating both galactic powers and influencing them into annihilating each other. Some Republic and Imperial forces also declare themselves loyal to Revan. Revan then draws the Empire and Republic into a battle with the Revanite ships over the planet Rishi, so that neither the Republic nor the Empire can interfere when he confronts the Emperor. However, this plan is thwarted when the player character sends a communication to Republic and Imperial ships informing them of Revan's plan and telling them to cease all fire.

Revan is later cornered on Yavin 4 where they try to raise the Emperor but is confronted and defeated by the player and an alliance of Republic and Imperial characters. After the Emperor makes his presence known and leaves Yavin 4, an apparition of Revan appears and reveals that when they were defeated in the Foundry, only their light side became one with the Force, while their dark side, fuelled by hate for the Emperor, survived, setting off the "Forged Alliances" plotline. The two sides of Revan, one Jedi, the other Sith, then reunite, with the now-whole spirit warning the player and their allies that they must undo what has been done, lest otherwise the Emperor will see his evil plans through and everything will be lost. In the Echoes of Oblivion story, Revan's spirit returns to aid the player character in defeating the duplicate spirit of the Sith Emperor before it can possess Satele Shan.

=== Other appearances ===
Drew Karpyshyn’s novel Star Wars: The Old Republic: Revan, which connects events from the two Knights of the Old Republic games with Star Wars: The Old Republic, was published by Del Rey on November 15, 2011.

Revan was planned to appear in the third season of the animated television series Star Wars: The Clone Wars in the episode "Ghosts of Mortis", alongside Darth Bane as an influence on the Son, an embodiment of the dark side. The scene was cut before broadcast. The name Revan was later referenced in current Star Wars canon through Star Wars: The Rise of Skywalker: The Visual Dictionary, which names one of the Sith Eternal legions after Darth Revan.

Revan has also appeared in Star Wars: Galaxy of Heroes, a mobile role-playing game that includes several characters from the Knights of the Old Republic era.

== Promotion and merchandise ==
Darth Revan's masked design has been used in several licensed Star Wars products, particularly in fan-selected merchandise. Hasbro released a Darth Revan action figure in 2007, followed by a Darth Revan Mighty Mugg in 2009..

The character later continued to appear in promotional and collector-focused merchandise. Lego released a Darth Revan minifigure as a free-with-purchase promotional item in May 2014. Revan won the 2015 Black Series Fan Choice Poll at San Diego Comic-Con, resulting in a Darth Revan figure released in late 2016. GameStop-exclusive figures based on Jedi Knight Revan from Star Wars: Galaxy of Heroes and a Darth Revan Funko Pop were released in 2020.

== Reception and legacy ==
Revan has received positive reception as one of the best-known characters originating from Star Wars video games. GameSpot included Darth Revan in its 2019 list of notable Star Wars characters who came from video games. IGN ranked Darth Revan twelfth in its list of the top 100 Star Wars characters, and also placed Darth Revan and Darth Malak together in its list of major Star Wars villains, describing their visual designs as immediately memorable.

Much of the commentary on Revan focuses on the reveal that the player character is the former Sith Lord. Game Informer ranked the reveal among the top video game plot twists, treating it as one of the defining moments of Knights of the Old Republic. The article noted that the game first presents Darth Revan as a dead Sith Lord whose crimes are repeatedly described during the player's journey, causing light-side players to view Revan as a defeated enemy and dark-side players to view him as a fallen martyr. The subsequent revelation therefore recontextualizes both the player's character and their earlier decisions, before allowing the player either to reclaim Revan's Sith identity or continue toward redemption as a Jedi. In a retrospective "Moments" feature, the magazine described it as one of BioWare's most shocking plot revelations. Writing for RPGFan in 2023, James Turner similarly singled out the reveal as a memorable RPG storytelling moment, arguing that the game overturned the familiar amnesiac-protagonist convention by making Revan's hidden past the player's own.

Jennifer Hale, who voiced Bastila Shan, later said she was surprised by the reveal while recording the game and described Knights of the Old Republic as demonstrating the level of writing and surprise that video games could achieve. PC Gamer similarly reported Hale's surprise at the twist and connected it to the game's reputation for branching BioWare storytelling.

Kane identifies the concealed-identity reveal as a principal reason that the game remained a subject of discussion after release. He notes that character creation lets players choose Revan’s name, gender, class and appearance, while the story later imposes a past the player did not choose: the character was formerly a Sith Lord. Kane records Revan’s continued visibility through cosplay, fan-selected merchandise and custom sculpture centered around the character's mask design and silhouette. Gallagher said that he had not expected Revan to remain so prominent in the fandom after the game’s release. Echoing Karpyshyn's view that Revan belonged strongly to the fans, Kane characterizes the character's afterlife as unusually persistent for a protagonist originating in a video game tie-in to a film franchise.

== Bibliography ==
- Kane, Alex (2019). Star Wars: Knights of the Old Republic. Boss Fight Books. ISBN 978-1-940535-21-0.
- Parisi, Frank; Erickson, Daniel (2011). The Art and Making of Star Wars: The Old Republic. Chronicle Books. ISBN 978-0-8118-7500-4.
