= Star Wars: The Old Republic – Rise of the Hutt Cartel =

- Developer: BioWare
- Publishers: Electronic Arts; LucasArts
- Series: Star Wars: Knights of the Old Republic
- Engine: HeroEngine
- Platform: Microsoft Windows
- Release: WW: April 14, 2013
- Genre: Massively multiplayer online role-playing game
- Mode: Multiplayer

Star Wars: The Old Republic – Rise of the Hutt Cartel is an expansion pack developed by BioWare and published by Electronic Arts for Star Wars: The Old Republic, a massively multiplayer online role-playing game (MMORPG) set in the distant past of the Star Wars universe. It was released for Microsoft Windows on April 14, 2013. The expansion concerns the planet Makeb, a resource-rich world which is embroiled in civil war and on the brink of environmental catastrophe, and features two distinct overarching plots depending on whether the player character is affiliated with the Sith Empire or the Galactic Republic.

Rise of the Hutt Cartel is the first expansion pack for The Old Republic. It received average reviews from video game publications. The various new gameplay elements introduced in the pack have been praised, whereas the implementation of same-sex romance content has been widely criticized by both supporters and detractors.

== Gameplay ==
Rise of the Hutt Cartel is an expansion pack for Star Wars: The Old Republic, a BioWare-developed MMORPG set in the Star Wars Legends canon from April 2014 onwards. The pack's narrative takes place 300 years after the events of the Star Wars: Knights of the Old Republic games, and more than 3,600 years before the events in the Star Wars films.

Rise of the Hutt Cartel adds a new world for player characters who have attained level 50, and extends the cap to 55. Player characters, depending on their chosen faction, are placed in a particular role within an unfolding narrative on the world of Makeb, which is divided into a series of rocky, temperate islands, with a panoramic view of palaces built by the Hutt species jutting out of distant cliffsides. The player character follows the expansion pack's story arc, which branches across a sequence of zones depending on their faction affiliation, with the option of completing side-quests and bonuses.

One of the new features introduced in Rise of the Hutt Cartel is "macrobinoculars", which allow players to scan and uncover distant and hidden objects. Same-sex romance options are another notable addition, including Cytharat, a male Pureblood Sith Lord who could be romanced by male characters from either the Republic or Sith Empire factions, and Lemda Avesta, a human female geophysicist who could be romanced by both male and female characters. However, the romanceable characters do not accompany the player character on their travels and do not appear outside of Makeb.

== Development and release ==
Rise of the Hutt Cartel is the first expansion pack for The Old Republic. It was developed by BioWare Austin, the same studio that led development on the main game. It features the Hutt species, slug-like aliens who wield considerable influence as leaders in organized crime within the Star Wars universe, as the story's main antagonists, who attempt to become a galactic superpower. Makeb is noted as a beautiful world with many towering geological formations, but has been ravaged by ecological disaster and is a hostile environment. Hall Hood, lead writer for The Old Republic, compared the pack to "a huge summer blockbuster" and claimed that "the choices that players are going to make are going to affect the larger conflict." Senior designer Brian Audette indicated that Rise of the Hutt Cartel would feature the "most ruthless enemies" players have faced yet.

The pack was officially announced on December 18, 2012. On February 20, 2013, the expansion entered public testing. Players who pre-ordered the pack before April 13, 2013, received three in-game items as rewards. The pack was released worldwide on April 14, 2013, for Microsoft Windows. It was later made free to subscribers of The Old Republic.

== Reception ==
Reception

Aggregate scores
| Aggregator | Score |
|---|---|
| GameRankings | 71.33% |
| Metacritic | 71/100 |

Review scores
| Publication | Score |
|---|---|
| GameSpot | 7.5/10 |
| IGN | 7.6/10 |
| PC Gamer (UK) | 63/100 |

Overall critical reception for Rise of the Hutt Cartel has been mixed. It holds a score of 71 on Metacritic, and a similar score of 71.33% on GameRankings. Leif Johnson of IGN gave a positive review, giving it 7.6 out of 10 and praising the storylines themselves and the planet, but criticizing the droid missions and noting the impact of the game's tightened budget. A similarly positive review came from GameSpot, which gave the expansion 7.5 out of 10, liking the new romances, and ending with "it may not be a renaissance for The Old Republic, but there's a wealth of new content to freshen things up considerably." Both reviewers missed the companion dialogue from the main game.

A less positive review came from PC Gamer's Chris Thursten which gave it 63 out of 100, who also praised Makeb but calling it "too little too late for all but the most dedicated fans". Sophie Prell for The Penny Arcade Report believed the expansion to have some of the best voice-acting in the game, and felt the planet had a nice pace due to less irrelevant side quests, but called it "like a map pack" and said the same-sex romances introduced were "shallow and limited".

BioWare's handling of same-sex romances for Rise of the Hutt Cartel came under criticism. Kyle Orland from Ars Technica reported on the varied range of reactions from certain players, who objected to same-gender romance or felt relegating them to a single planet did not go far enough. The Guardian's Mary Hamilton noted the controversy, and called Makeb "the sort of problem that comes about when a series of perfectly reasonable decisions takes a development team to a very weird place". James Stephanie Sterling of Destructoid called the planet "a rather inelegant solution", and felt it may have been better to simply wait for further same-gender romance content than including it in the expansion only. Executive producer Jeff Hickman addressed the issue, and apologized for how long it was taking for same-sex romance to appear in the game. Nonetheless, both Cytharat and Lemda have been brought up in retrospective discussions about the historical portrayal of queer characters in the Star Wars universe as notable examples of the franchise's LGBT representation.
