= Star Wars: Galaxy of Heroes =

2015 video game

- Startup screen
- Developers: EA Capital Games; EA Mobile
- Publisher: Electronic Arts
- Platforms: Android, iOS, iPadOS, Microsoft Windows
- Release: November 24, 2015; Microsoft Windows; April 18, 2024 (only EA app)
- Genre: Role-playing

Star Wars: Galaxy of Heroes is a mobile collectible RPG game developed by EA Capital Games and EA Mobile and published by Electronic Arts. The game received a soft launch in Australia during October 2015, and was formally released on November 24, 2015.

A Microsoft Windows port of the game was announced to be in development in the spring of 2024.

As of late 2021, the game had surpassed 100 million downloads and had generated over $1.4 billion in revenue.

== Premise ==
Galaxy of Heroes is set in a cantina in a distant corner of the Star Wars galaxy, where people of varying species compete in simulated holographic battles involving notable figures throughout Star Wars history for fame and fortune.

== Gameplay ==
Galaxy of Heroes allows players to collect Star Wars characters from both the main canonical universe established after Lucasfilm was acquired by The Walt Disney Company and the Legends-canon Star Wars: Knights of the Old Republic series, create teams with them, and use them to fight in turn-based battles. There are multiple ways to collect characters: some are given to players immediately, whereas others are gained via game play or as in-game rewards in the form of shards that are earned by players to unlock and or promote their characters. Shards can either be earned from battles or bought from a shop. Maximizing one non-event character's rarity to seven stars unlocks a special shop in which excess shards from seven-star non-event heroes can be exchanged for gear. The shard amount needed for the character to be unlocked will also correspond to their starting star level, which can range from one to seven stars. Characters can be promoted to a max of seven stars with each additional star increasing their power. There are also training droids that can provide varying levels of experience points to level up characters. Gear, mods, and ability parts can all upgrade characters, although some gear can primarily be won only from battles for one particular side of the Force, to encourage players to play on both sides. The maximum level cap in Star Wars: Galaxy of Heroes is 85, which was changed from the previous level cap of 80 (previously 70). The maximum gear level is gear 13; beyond this, characters improve their "Mastery" with Relic Amplifiers, which have a maximum of level 10 (previously capped at level 9, and before that at level 8). Players level up their user level by gaining experience, completing daily quests, or completing battles. The main currencies of the game are "credits" and "crystals". Credits can be used to train a hero, buy things from the store, obtain a hero when you have enough shards or promote a hero's star rarity. Crystals can be used to buy packs from the store, buy credits, acquire character shards, and energy and arena attempt refreshes. Crystals can be bought with money or can be earned as rewards from arena and daily challenges.

Battles are divided up into rounds, with the character with the highest speed stat going first. Each team consists of up to five (six with an ally or summoned unit) different hologram avatars which battle until defeated or retreated. Battles are turn-based, again based on the speed attribute, where the combatants apply various buffs to their own team and inflict debuffs on their opponent, all while trying to deal the most overall damage and have the last character alive.

The game also features regularly scheduled limited-time events that encourage daily participation. These events often provide rare rewards or character shards. Progress in the game is gated by energy systems, and players can purchase in-game currency (Crystals) to bypass timers or obtain characters faster through randomized loot mechanics.

=== Modes ===
There are various modes for players to engage in, including squad arena (player vs. player), dark and light side battles, cantina, galactic wars, raids, and various special events. Opponents in all modes are played by the computer controlled AI, including the squad arena battles in which the AI controls a player-created team.

Center Table:

- Coliseum: Lead a squad of characters from the current era to fight a rotating roster of deadly foes.
- Era Character Campaign: Battle Enemies with new Era Characters to earn high power gear.

Upper Center Table:

- Shipments: Purchase randomly available character shards and gear with crystals and credits, which change every six hours.
- Store: Purchase data cards to get characters and consumable resource items, or redeem a Bronzium data card with earned Ally Points.

Upper Left Tables:

- Campaign Select: Selects a Legacy 3-Wave Campaign

- Neutral Cantina Campaign: Lead a squad of heroes and villains to defeat unlikely combinations of enemies in 3-wave battles.

- Light Side Characters Campaign: Lead a squad of light side heroes to defeat dark side enemies in 3-wave battles.

- Dark Side Characters Campaign: Lead a squad of dark side villains to defeat light side enemies in 3-wave battles.

- Neutral Mod Battles Campaign: Engage in 5-wave battles against enemies enhanced by particular mods to earn low-grade mods and slicing parts.
- Mod Challenges: Win mod battles to earn better mods of a particular stat.

Upper Right Tables:

- Squad Arena: Battle against other player squads in 5-on-5 battles, while competing for daily prizes based on ranking.
- Galactic Battles: Includes two campaigns: Galactic War, which involves battling 12 player-made teams, and Conquest, a 5-stage mode with two difficulties and exclusive rewards.

Lower Left Tables:

- Daily Challenges: Complete daily challenges to obtain important resources and select gear.
- Grand Arena Championships: Players at maximum level are grouped into 8 and pitted against three opponents in a mini-Territory Battle with rare gear and slicing parts at stake.

Lower Right Tables:

- Special Event Battles: Participate in special battles reflecting Star Wars scenarios to earn rewards
- Shard Shop Shipments: Purchase gear or shards for General Grievous with currency redeemed from excess 7-star character shards
- Scavenger: Make top-gear characters even stronger by pooling together spare parts to upgrade their personal artifacts, called relics.

"Back Room" Areas: Far Left, Guilds

- Guild Raids: Work together to defeat a powerful boss and earn rare gear and shards for a special character.
- Territory Battles: Work together to drive enemy armies away from a large swath of territory.
- Guild Shipments: Purchase items with guild tokens earned from guild victories, including character shards.
- Guild Member Item Requests/Donations: Allows a guild member to donate or request gear items.
- Guild Management: Review the guild's current statistics along with a list of members.
- Guild Search: Search for other guilds.

Far Right, Ships

- Fleet Arena: Pit your created fleet against other player's fleets and compete for daily rewards based on ranking.
- Daily Ship Challenges: Complete daily challenges to earn ship resources.
- Fleet Arena Store: Use currency earned from arena ranking to buy blueprints, shards and high-grade ability materials.
- Neutral Fleet Battles: Use your fleet to defeat computer-controlled enemy fleets, composed of heroes, villains or both, in single-wave 3-on-3 battles.

=== Guilds ===
Guilds were introduced to the game in April 2016. As with most games, guilds in Star Wars: Galaxy of Heroes consist of players teaming together to achieve common goals. In this game, guilds consist of a maximum of 50 players that can go on raids, and participate in both Territory Wars and Territory Battles. The guild search interfaces received a small update in April 2021.

Territory Battles are cooperative events in which guild members work together with characters of a certain faction to defeat enemies of a rival faction across a map broken down into multiple territories, each with their own missions and objectives to complete over the course of several days. The guild is scored on how well they complete the objectives. Territory Wars is a super-multiplayer mode where one guild clashes with another over the course of two days. On the first day, each guild sets up the defense for its territory by assigning characters in squads to each portion of its own territory. On the second day, each guild would then attack the rival guild by sending squads of otherwise unused characters to assault the rival guild's territory, starting from its frontmost regions and working their way towards the rear ones as each region is wiped of enemy characters. The guild that scores the most points at the end of the second day, whether from successful attacks or defenses, is the winner and receives more rewards than the loser.

=== Raids ===
Raids were added to the game in April 2016, with the first raid, called "The Pit", being about a battle against a Rancor in Jabba the Hutt's palace during the events of Return of the Jedi. Guilds send in teams of five hologram avatars at a time to battle multiple powerful bosses across four different stages, with all bosses sharing a universal health bar that is split into fourths, one for each stage, which decreases as the damage the guild inflicts begins to accumulate. Once it empties completely, the raid is won and participating members will be given rewards. Some raids have multiple difficulty levels, with the highest one, called "Heroic", awarding shards of a special character that are otherwise very difficult to acquire, while enforcing a permadeath rule on all characters used in a raid attempt.

Several more raids have been released throughout the game's operation, each based on a different era with varying mechanics and difficulties. The second and third raids involved confronting an Armored Assault Tank backed by Separatist forces ("Tank Takedown") and dueling the Sith Triumvirate, Darth Nihilus, Darth Sion and Darth Traya, during the Knights of the Old Republic duology ("The Sith Triumvirate"), respectively. Capital Games then released a fourth raid in 2020, which was a more difficult version of the rancor battle, called "The Rancor Unleashed" and is intended for characters with max gear and enhanced Relics. This fourth raid was criticized by players for its high difficulty on its initial launch, leading Capital Games to fine-tune its mechanics the following year.

A fifth raid was also added in the spring of 2023, inspired by the season 2 premiere of the Disney+ streaming series The Mandalorian, "Chapter 9: The Marshal", in which players dispatch squads from a limited set of factions to take on a ferocious krayt dragon. Unlike prior raids, the krayt dragon has infinite health and players are instead scored on how much damage they can inflict on it. A sixth raid was added in late 2023 to celebrate the 40th anniversary of Return of the Jedi, a non-boss raid in which the player's squad members fly speeder bikes to battle Imperial scout troopers in deadly high-speed chases through the forests of Endor. A seventh raid about Jedi surviving Order 66 also launched in June 2025 to commemorate the twentieth anniversary of Revenge of the Sith.

=== Ships ===
Ship battles were added on November 22, 2016. This feature allows players to control various spaceships through their captains and pilots. The vehicles are controlled and played similarly to the main game with the player's characters, with the addition of an unassailable capital ship, which offers leadership bonuses, special abilities, and additional attacks.

At launch of the feature, 23 different ships were available. As of January 2023, there are 51 ships and 10 capital ships. Ships enhancement mirrors that of characters, each area available for improvement - rarity, level, skill level - requiring a different, special currency. These currencies are acquired through daily challenges and daily reward for fleet arena standing.

=== Mods ===
Mods (short for modifications) are an optional upgrade for characters within the game. Once the player's account reaches level 50, Mods become available to any of their characters that are level 50 or above. There are different categories of mods, each of which yields a different primary effect on the stats of the character that has equipped it. This effect allows players to increase statistical areas of their characters to yield better performance in battle.

In the late summer of 2018, EA released an update that significantly changed how mods worked, dubbed "Mods 2.0". The update grants players more freedom on what kinds of mods they would like to acquire by eliminating character faction requirements from the Mod Challenges, and provides suggestions for each character on which mod types should be used. In addition, mods graded as Mark V (the original, typical Mark limit) can be "sliced" to increase their color tier and level up extra secondary stats, and can be sliced once more to reach an extra-higher, exclusive Mark VI tier. In October 2021, players were given the ability to slice their Mark VI mods' color tier to the maximum of tier 6-A (Mark VI, color A). Slicing requires parts acquired from an extra set of very difficult mod battles against characters of a certain faction, while all mod battles now use a separate pool of energy. The slicing materials needed to slice mods from 6-E to 6-A were added as exclusive rewards in the Galactic Challenges, then also to Conquest when the latter was released.

== Reception ==
Reception

Aggregate score
Aggregator	Score
Metacritic	70/100

The game has received a mixed response from critics, currently holding a 70/100 rating on Metacritic based on 8 reviews. As of November 2021, the game has had 100 million players.

== In other media ==
- In 2019, one of the game's many characters, the Jedi Knight Guardian, made an appearance in the first issue of the Marvel comic book series Star Wars: Age of Republic - Obi-Wan Kenobi, which identifies her as Jedi Master Tosan.
