= Star Wars: The Old Republic =

2011 video game

- Developers: BioWare (2011–2023); Broadsword Online Games (2023–present)
- Publisher: Electronic Arts
- Director: James Ohlen
- Producer: Dallas Dickinson
- Designers: Damien Schubert; Georg Zoeller
- Programmers: Thomas Boyd; Ken Shuck
- Artist: Jeff Dobson
- Writers: Drew Karpyshyn; Daniel Erickson
- Composers: Mark Griskey; Gordy Haab
- Series: Star Wars: Knights of the Old Republic
- Engine: HeroEngine
- Platforms: Microsoft Windows; macOS
- Release: NA/EU: December 20, 2011; AU: March 1, 2012
- Genre: Massively multiplayer online role-playing game
- Mode: Multiplayer

Star Wars: The Old Republic is a massively multiplayer online role-playing game (MMORPG) based in the Star Wars fictional universe. Developed by BioWare Austin and a supplemental team at BioWare Edmonton, the game was announced on October 21, 2008. The video game was released for the Microsoft Windows platform on December 20, 2011 in North America and part of Europe. It was released in Oceania and Asia on March 1, 2012.

This story takes place in the Star Wars universe shortly after the establishment of a tenuous peace between the re-emergent Sith Empire and the Galactic Republic. The game features eight different classes. Each of the eight classes has a three act storyline that progresses as the character levels up. Players join either the Republic or the Sith Empire, but players may possess a morality at any point along the light/dark spectrum. Different classes favor different styles of gameplay, and the game features extensive customization options, fully voiced dialogue, companion characters, and dialogue options similar to BioWare's other role-playing games.

Although not officially disclosed, based on estimates, it is one of the most developmentally expensive games ever made. The game had one million subscribers within three days of its launch, making it the world's "fastest-growing MMO ever"; however, in the following months the game lost a fair share of its subscriptions, but has remained profitable. The game has since adopted the hybrid free-to-play business model with remaining subscription option. The game was met with positive reception upon release and has received several updates and expansion packs. Several books and comics based on the game have been released. It is estimated that the game made $139 million in additional revenues on top of the subscription income in 2013. In an earnings call to investors in October 2019, Electronic Arts announced that Star Wars: The Old Republic was closing in on a billion dollars in lifetime revenue, making it a financial success based on the reported $200 million development budget.

Since its release, the game has received multiple expansions as well as significant technical and graphical updates.

== Plot ==
This story takes place in the Star Wars fictional universe shortly after the establishment of a tenuous peace between the re-emergent Sith Empire and the Galactic Republic, 300 years after the events of the Star Wars: Knights of the Old Republic games, and more than 3,600 years before the events in the Star Wars films.

The Jedi are held responsible for the success of the Sith during the devastating 28-year-long Great Galactic War (which led to the Treaty of Coruscant prior to the "cold war"), and thus choose to relocate from Coruscant to Tython, where the Jedi Order had initially been founded, to seek guidance from the Force. The Sith control Korriban, where they have re-established a Sith Academy. The game's "Return" cinematic trailer depicts the events where Korriban is re-conquered by the Sith.

During these events, a smuggler named Nico Okarr is led to his prison cell in a jail orbiting Korriban by a Jedi, Satele Shan, and her master, Kao Cen Darach. Suddenly, a Sith named Darth Malgus, and his master Vindican, along with several Sith troops, attack the base. Satele, a trooper named Jace Malcom, and Okarr escape the attack, but Darach is cut down by Malgus. Malgus then kills Vindican, who was wounded by Darach.

Ten years later, new conflicts have arisen. In the "Hope" cinematic trailer, Satele and some troops destroy a Sith party that includes Malgus. Malcom, who has become the troop's commander, states that, despite the losses, there is still hope amongst even "a single spark of courage". Later in the "Deceived" cinematic trailer, however, Malgus, having appeared to survive the earlier attack albeit with a mask covering his nose and mouth, leads an army of Sith into the Jedi Temple on Coruscant, killing many Jedi including the Jedi Master Ven Zallow.

Master Satele Shan is named the new Jedi Grand Master. The game itself is set in the cold-war soon after these events, with the Jedi Order and Galactic Republic struggling to maintain their control of the core worlds while the Sith plot their downfall and the expansion of the Sith Empire. The conflict opens on many fronts and across many planets, while native factions are engaged in political struggles or civil war.

BioWare stated, prior to release, that the game would have a significant focus on the storyline. Each of the eight classes has a three act storyline that progresses as the character levels up. A collaborative effort between BioWare, Lucasfilm Games, EA, and Dark Horse Comics has resulted in webcomics entitled Star Wars: The Old Republic – Threat of Peace and Star Wars: The Old Republic – Blood of the Empire, the purpose of which is to establish the backstory as the game opens and closes.

== Gameplay ==
Players join as members of either of the two main factions – the Galactic Republic and the Sith Empire. Although each faction is led by a benevolent or malevolent leader, it is emphasized that an individual member may possess a morality at any point along the light/dark spectrum. The project's key focus is to differentiate between the player's faction and morality. For instance, a member with ties to the Sith Empire following the lightside while attempting to achieve their own ends, which may be misaligned or different from a sith's vision.

Player advancement occurs by a combination of mission completion, exploration, and defeating enemies. New skills are now learned automatically. Heroic missions exist that require the cooperation of multiple players to complete objectives, and can be repeated normally on a daily basis.

While each class in The Old Republic favors a certain play style (ranged/melee damage, healing or support skills, or tanking), customization combined with companion characters allow for a class to be able to tackle many different situations, with or without the support of other player characters, and without requiring specific other classes in order to move forward.

A view of the conversation wheel with a Darkside response highlighted

Players' choices permanently open or close storylines and affect players' non-player character (NPC) companions. It is intended that the game should provide more context for characters' missions than any previous MMORPG. Every character in the game, including the player character, features full voice dialog to enhance gameplay, and interactions feature a dialogue system similar to that used in the Mass Effect series. Players are able to choose from a variety of NPCs, although spending time with a single companion will help more in developing story and content than dividing time among several, and may even develop a love interest. It is possible for players to "blow it big time" if they fail to meet NPCs' expectations. Players also have access to several planets, including Korriban, Ord Mantell, Nal Hutta, Tython, Coruscant, Balmorra, Alderaan, Tatooine, Dromund Kaas, Taris, Belsavis, Voss, Hoth, Corellia, Ilum, and Quesh, and the moon Nar Shaddaa. The planet Makeb was added in Patch 2.0, along with the Rise of the Hutt Cartel expansion pack.

Every player receives their own starship, which was announced at Electronic Entertainment Expo 2010. Footage of space combat was released at Gamescom. The short clip provided by BioWare revealed that space combat would be a "tunnel shooter". A tunnel shooter, otherwise known as a scrolling shooter or rail shooter, is a flying game where the player is on a predetermined track. Game play includes moving right and left on the X axis and up and down on the Y axis; however, players do not have control of the speed of their space craft. Jake Neri, LucasArts Producer, told PC Gamer in their October 2010 issue that their goal was to "capture the most cinematic moments that we can create. We want players to get in and feel like they're in the movies. It's about highly cinematic, controlled combat moments ... very heroic, action-packed, exciting, visceral and dangerous encounters that'll make you pee your pants." With the December 2013 release of the free expansion, Galactic Starfighter (GSF), players now have a free flight PVP space combat experience, with multiple ships and roles independent of other aspects of the game.

Like many other MMORPGs, the game features dungeons and raids in the form of Flashpoints and Operations respectively.

=== Species ===
A range of playable species are available for the player to choose from, some limited to their factions. Both sides can play Human, Cyborg (human-based), Twi'lek or Zabrak (whose appearances are initially different depending on which side the character is from). The Republic-only races are the Miraluka and Mirialan, while the Empire-only races are the Chiss, Rattataki and Sith Pureblood. Humans, Cyborgs and Zabrak can pick any class available, while the other species are restricted to limited choices of classes by default.

More playable species are said to be available in the future through major updates and the Legacy system with the ability to use other classes' abilities through this system. The Cathar were added to the game during Patch 2.1, and is available to all players who unlock the species through the Cartel Market. The Togruta race was announced in January 2015 as a new playable race and released in the same year with patch 3.3. The Nautolan species was then added with the Onslaught expansion in late 2019.

The release of the expanded "Legacy" system in April 2012 allows for species to be able to play all classes (both Empire and Republic) by unlocking that species with an infusion of in-game money or by levelling a character of that race to level 50. Under this system, for example, a player may choose Chiss, which by default can only choose the non-Sith classes on the Empire side, as a new Sith character. Likewise, a Sith Pureblood, which by default can only choose the Force-powered classes, could choose to be a non-Force class. Along the same vein, both species, which are restricted to the Empire, could even choose the option of fighting for the Republic, including training as a Jedi. By the same method, unlocking the Zabrak species allows users to play both appearances regardless from which side the character is from.

=== Classes ===
Each faction contains different classes, each with a distinct backstory and a branching storyline affected by players' moral choices. Classes are exclusive to one faction or the other. However, the classes of one faction mirror the classes of the other (for example, Jedi Knight and Sith Warrior). Eight classes exist: the Jedi Knight, Jedi Consular, Trooper, and Smuggler for the Galactic Republic; and the Sith Warrior, Sith Inquisitor, Bounty Hunter, and Imperial Agent for the Sith Empire. Although each class has a distinct storyline, they are integrated with the game's overall arc.

Each class may also choose from two advanced classes, resulting in a total of 8 advanced classes per faction. Advanced classes share the same storyline as their base class. Lightsaber and blaster colors are not faction or class restricted, but some are restricted based on level and/or Lightside or Darkside alignment.

As of the Legacy of the Sith expansion, players are now allowed to separate their Class Story from their Advanced Classes, which are now called "Combat Styles". Players can now select any force-based combat style when playing force-based class stories, or any tech-based combat style when playing tech-based class stories.

=== Ships ===
A view of the ship inventory tab while inside the cockpit of the D-5 Mantis

Each class has their own starship, which serves as the player's base of operations. Bounty Hunters have the D5-Mantis patrol craft. Sith Warriors and Sith Inquistors have the Fury. Imperial Agents have the X-70B Phantom. Smugglers have the XS Freighter. Troopers have the BT-7 Thunderclap. Jedi Knights and Jedi Consulars have the Defender. Certain pieces of these ships can be upgraded, allowing them to perform better in space combat missions.

=== Companions ===
The game features a passive form of crafting, known as Crew Skills, in which a player's companions carry out gathering and crafting tasks asynchronously to the player's adventures out in the world. Each class gets five companions via their storyline. The player can assign up to five companions to perform up to 3 various skills. Crafting skills allow the player's companions to create items, and the player can reverse engineer many items to possibly learn to make a better version. The item is destroyed in the process, but the player gets some of the materials back. Gathering skills allow the player or their companions to gather resources out in the world. Mission skills allow the player's companions to perform acts on the player's behalf, gaining the player Light or Dark Side influence and other rewards, such as medical items or companion gifts.

During E3 2011, a video was shown with gameplay footage of the Bounty Hunter, along with a Jawa companion named Blizz. The developers stated during the chat that only the Bounty Hunter would be able to get Blizz and that other classes would have unique companions as well, including some companions that are force users. It was also shown that companions would have a similar character screen as the players and can have gear just like a player character.

BioWare announced same-sex romance options with companions or other NPCs before release. The options were implemented for some non-companions in Rise of the Hutt Cartel, and expanded with Shadow of Revan. Options for some new companions were implemented in Knights of the Fallen Empire, and expanded for some new and original companions with Knights of the Eternal Empire up to marriage.

During patch 1.5, HK-51 was added for all classes on both Empire and Republic factions. He was the first companion added to every classes, and can be obtained through a questline. He is an assassin droid based on the popular HK-47 from the original Knights of the Old Republic series.

A female Ewok companion, Treek, was implemented in patch 2.3 and is available to all classes. This companion requires either a purchase from the Cartel Market or a 1 million credit fee along with a Legacy Level of 40.

Lana Beniko, a soft-spoken Sith Lord known as "The Dark Advisor" who is seemingly serene and thoughtful in temperament, is a notable companion who first appears as part of Update 2.7 in April 2014 for Rise of the Hutt Cartel alongside the addition of Theron Shan. Her role in the overarching narrative of The Old Republic is expanded in subsequent expansion packs, starting with Shadow of Revan.

== Development ==
The Old Republic is BioWare's first entry into the massively multiplayer online role-playing game (MMORPG) market, and is the third Star Wars MMORPG after Star Wars Galaxies, which was shut down in December 2011, the same month SWTOR was released and Clone Wars Adventures, which was shut down in March 2014. The development saw the entirety of BioWare Austin working on the game. BioWare had long been interested in working on a MMORPG, but waited until they had "the right partners, the right team, and the right I.P." A major focus in the game is on developing characters' individual stories and, in October 2008, BioWare considered this game to have more story content than all of their other games combined. The writing team worked on the project longer than any of the game's other development teams. An October 2008 preview noted some of the 12 full-time writers had been working on The Old Republic for more than two years at that point. Although BioWare has not disclosed development costs, industry leaders and financial analysts have estimated it to be between $150 million and $200 million or more, making it, at the time, the most expensive video game made, though if marketing costs are included, it is eclipsed by Grand Theft Auto V, with an estimated cost of $265 million. The game had 1 million subscribers within three days of its launch, making it the world's "fastest-growing MMO ever". However, in the following months the game lost a fair share of its subscriptions, but has remained profitable. The game has since adopted the hybrid free-to-play business model with remaining subscription option. It is estimated that the game made $139 million in additional revenues, in addition to the subscription income, in 2013.

The game's first cinematic trailer, "Deceived", was shown at the Electronic Arts 2009 E3 Press Conference on June 1, 2009. A public live demo was shown for the first time at the Gamescom. On September 29, 2009, BioWare announced that they would be accepting applications for testers from the game community. Within minutes, the official website was down due to traffic, and BioWare announced shortly after that the site was being changed in order to accommodate the increase in visitors. A second cinematic trailer, "Hope", was released on June 14, 2010, that depicts another battle that happened before the game, the Battle of Alderaan. On June 6, a new trailer "Return" was released at E3 2011 depicting the initial Sith invasion force as it retakes its home world of Korriban. Game testing was officially announced to be underway on July 9, 2010, for testers from North American territories.

The Australasia release was delayed, to hold back digital and boxed copies to avoid any problems encountered during launch. However, BioWare revealed that the game would not be region or IP blocked, allowing players to purchase the game from other regions. Additionally, BioWare allowed Australian and New Zealand players to take part in the beta stages of the game. BioWare community manager Allison Berryman said "Data from this test will be used to inform decisions about the launch of the game in Oceanic regions".

On October 11, 2011, BioWare announced that Star Wars: The Old Republic would be released globally on December 20, 2011. However, this 'global' launch only included North America and a part of Europe, as the launch date had delayed for the Asia and Oceanic regions. On December 21, 2011, BioWare announced that an Australian and New Zealand release date had been set for March 1, 2012.

Early access to the game was granted one week before release, on December 13, 2011, for those who had pre-ordered the game online; access opened in "waves" based on pre-order date.

On January 18, 2012, the first content patch (1.1) was released, adding a new Flashpoint and adding four bosses to an existing Operation. Patch (1.2) was released on April 12, 2012. The update included the new Legacy system, a new Flashpoint, Operation, a PVP Warzone, as well as improved character textures and advanced options such as user interface customization. Guild banks and player character pets were introduced. A Weekend Pass Free Trial was made available for new players but has since closed. Patch 1.3 was released in June 2012. The game update featured a New Group Finder, the ability to augment every item, adaptable social gear, and the ability to request character transfer between servers. Subsequent patches have introduced a 'Cartel Market' where players can purchase virtual currency to spend on cosmetic items in-game. These items include armour sets, lightsaber colour crystals, mounts, pets and character-perk unlocks.

In January 2012, Star Wars: The Old Republic was officially recognized by Guinness World Records as the "Largest Entertainment Voice Over Project Ever", with over 200,000 lines of recorded dialogue. This feat is recorded in the Guinness World Records Gamer's Edition book. On April 26, 2012, BioWare announced that the game was available in the Middle East and remaining European countries who were excluded from the original launch. On July 21, 2020, the game became available on Steam.

In June 2023, IGN reported that EA would be making a deal to move the ongoing development and operation of The Old Republic from BioWare to Broadsword Online Games, which maintains Ultima Online and Dark Age of Camelot, to allow BioWare to focus on the Mass Effect and Dragon Age franchises.

=== Technical and graphical updates ===
Following its transition to Broadsword Online Games, Star Wars: The Old Republic has undergone a sustained technical overhaul aimed at replacing its aging, legacy foundation. The first major milestone occurred just before the transition in March 2023 with Game Update 7.2.1, which officially migrated the game client from a 32-bit architecture to a native 64-bit application. This crucial structural change allowed the game to utilize more than 4 GB of system RAM, significantly reducing client crashes caused by out-of-memory errors and laying the groundwork for more resource-intensive graphical additions.

Building upon the 64-bit framework, the development team initiated a multi-phase rendering update to replace the game's original DirectX 9 implementation. In late 2024, Broadsword announced the integration of rendering components from Electronic Arts’ proprietary Frostbite engine into SWTOR’s base architecture to enable DirectX 12 support. This integration represents a deep engine rewrite designed to improve CPU utilization, frame rate stability, and modern GPU optimization. The primary technical challenge shifted to rewriting the user interface pipeline, as the legacy UI code initially struggled to render properly under the updated DX12 backend. The planned "moving to DirectX 12 ... opens the door to all kinds of graphical improvements we’d [Broadsword Online Games] like to make in the future that wouldn’t be possible with DirectX 9".

In tandem with engine optimizations, the game continues to receive progressive visual enhancements to modernize its aesthetic. Game Update 7.6 launched a comprehensive character texture refresh, deploying high-resolution models and improved facial structures for base humanoid species like Humans, Chiss, Zabrak, and Mirialan. This update was later expanded to include expanded hair and skin pigment customization options for alien species such as Twi'leks, Togruta, and Nautolans. Furthermore, developers have implemented dynamic lighting improvements and higher-fidelity environment maps across older planets like Tython, Korriban, and Hoth, gradually closing the visual gap between 2011 vanilla content and modern expansions.

== Voice cast ==
The English-language voice cast for Star Wars: The Old Republic is unusually large, drawing performers from video games, animation, and audiobook narration. Voice direction was handled by Darragh O'Farrell and William Beckman. In January 2012, the game was recognized by Guinness World Records as the "Largest Entertainment Voice Over Project Ever", with more than 200,000 lines of recorded dialogue.

=== Player characters ===
Each of the game's eight classes has a dedicated male and female voice actor:

Class	Male voice	Female voice
Bounty Hunter	Tom Spackman	Grey DeLisle (also credited as Grey Griffin)
Imperial Agent	Bertie Carvel	Jo Wyatt
Jedi Knight	David Hayter	Kari Wahlgren
Jedi Consular	Nolan North	Athena Karkanis
Sith Inquisitor	Euan Morton	Xanthe Elbrick
Sith Warrior	Mark Bazeley	Natasha Little
Smuggler	Maury Sterling	Kath Soucie
Trooper	Brian Bloom	Jennifer Hale

Bertie Carvel, who voices the male Imperial Agent, is a British stage actor nominated for a Tony Award for Matilda the Musical (Miss Trunchbull), also known for Jonathan Strange & Mr Norrell and Doctor Foster.

Grey DeLisle (also credited as Grey Griffin), who voices the female Bounty Hunter, is a veteran American animation voice actress known for Daphne Blake in Scooby-Doo, Azula in Avatar: The Last Airbender, and Vicky in The Fairly OddParents.

David Hayter, who voices the male Jedi Knight, is best known as the longtime voice of Solid Snake/Big Boss in the Metal Gear Solid franchise, and as a screenwriter of X-Men and X2.

Jennifer Hale, who voices the female Trooper, is widely regarded as one of the most prolific voice actresses in video games, best known for Commander Shepard in the Mass Effect series.

Euan Morton, who voices the male Sith Inquisitor, is a Scottish actor and singer best known for originating Boy George in Taboo (Tony nomination) and for his record six-year run as King George III in Hamilton on Broadway; elsewhere in Star Wars, he narrated Tarkin and voiced Count Dooku and Emperor Palpatine in later audiobooks.

Nolan North, who voices the male Jedi Consular, is one of the most widely credited performers in video games, best known as Nathan Drake in the Uncharted series.

Kath Soucie, who voices the female Smuggler, is a veteran American animation voice actress best known for Phil and Lil DeVille in Rugrats.

=== Companions and other notable characters ===
Character	Voice actor
Vette	Catherine Taber
Kira Carsen	Laura Bailey
Malavai Quinn	Richard Teverson
Mako	Lacey Chabert
Risha	Tara Strong
SCORPIO	Deborah Unger
Torian Cadera	Johnny Yong Bosch
Akaavi Spar	Stacy Haiduk
Andronikus Revel	Steve Blum
Aric Jorgan	Tim Omundson
Ashara Zavros	Azura Skye
Corso Riggs	Troy Hall
Doc	Andrew Bowen
Doctor Lokin	Anthony Cochrane
Elara Dorne	Moira Quirk
Ensign Raina Temple	Georgia Van Cuylenburg
Felix Iresso	Dion Graham
Nadia Grell	Holly Fields
Sergeant Rusk	Ron Yuan
Skadge	Neil Kaplan
Tanno Vik	David Anthony Pizzuto
Tharan Cedrix	Jamie Elman
Vector Hyllus	Ifan Meredith
Lord Scourge	Joseph Gatt
Lana Beniko	Lydia Leonard
Theron Shan	Troy Baker
Darth Malgus	Jamie Glover
Darth Marr	Michael Harney
Darth Revan	Spencer Garrett
Valkorion	Darin De Paul
Vitiate	Doug Bradley
General Garza	Kate Weiman

== Subscription ==
The Old Republic required a monthly subscription to play, following a month of play included with the initial purchase. Options are available to pay for one month, two month, three month, or six month blocks, with discounted rates for multiple month blocks. Payment is by credit card or time card. The free-to-play version integrates most of the primary features in the game, but has several restrictions, such as credit limits and reduced leveling speed.

After launch, the game's subscribers rose to 1.7 million by February 2012. By the end of March 2012, those numbers fell to 1.3 million. By July 2012, the subscriber base fell below 1 million, prompting EA to convert the game to free-to-play. EA stated that 500,000 subscribers were needed to make the game profitable saying that they were "well above" that number. By May 2013, subscriptions had fallen below 500,000 but at the time, stabilized there. On November 15, 2012, the free-to-play option went live on all servers. As of August 2014 the game has over one million monthly players.

As of 2025, Star Wars: The Old Republic continues to generate substantial revenue through a combination of optional subscriptions, in-game purchases, and content expansions. A breakdown published by the fan and analytics site SWTOR Strategies estimates the game’s daily, monthly, and yearly earnings, highlighting its continued commercial relevance more than a decade after launch.

== Expansion packs ==
Star Wars: The Old Republic expansions
Title	Launch
Rise of the Hutt Cartel	April 14, 2013
Galactic Starfighter	February 4, 2014
Galactic Strongholds	October 14, 2014
Shadow of Revan	December 9, 2014
Knights of the Fallen Empire	October 27, 2015
Knights of the Eternal Throne	December 2, 2016
Onslaught	October 22, 2019
Legacy of the Sith	February 15, 2022

=== Rise of the Hutt Cartel ===
In October 2012, BioWare announced The Old Republic's first digital expansion pack, Rise of the Hutt Cartel, in which the Hutt Cartel's attempts to challenge the Galactic Republic and the Sith Empire for control of the galaxy. The level cap was raised to 55. The battle with the Hutts and leveling above 50 is centered on the planet Makeb, which hides a "powerful secret". Much like the main game, the campaign on Makeb is fully voiced.

Rise of the Hutt Cartel was released on April 14, 2013. Those who pre-ordered the expansion prior to January 7, 2013, were allowed early access on April 9. Rise of the Hutt Cartel is now free to play for all players in Star Wars: The Old Republic.

=== Galactic Starfighter ===
In October 2013, BioWare announced its next expansion, which unlike its predecessor Rise of the Hutt Cartel did not include any story content; however, Galactic Starfighter introduced 12v12 space-based PvP combat on two maps, with 2 'capture-the-flag' combat missions. Three stock starfighters were made available—a scout, a strike fighter, and a gunship. More are accessible for Cartel Coins. Subscribers began their early access on December 3, 2013, with full subscriber awards if they maintained an active subscription on November 1. "Preferred access" players, those who do not have an active subscription but have purchased items via the Cartel Market, received their early access on January 14, 2014, with some rewards. Full access to all players with an account opened on February 4, 2014. A new "deathmatch" game style was added with the update, as well as a new starfighter class, the bomber.

=== Galactic Strongholds ===
In January 2014, BioWare revealed plans for 2014 including two expansion packs, with one similar to Galactic Starfighter in scope and one more closely resembling Rise of the Hutt Cartel. The first is entitled Galactic Strongholds, introducing player housing and flagships for guilds. Subscribers received early access August 19, 2014, as well as access to the exclusive "Nar Shaddaa Sky Palace"; preferred access players received early access starting September 16. Full access to all players with an account opened October 14, 2014.

=== Shadow of Revan ===
On October 6, BioWare announced the second planned story expansion, entitled Shadow of Revan. The expansion is centered on the Order of Revan, formerly a fringe group that appeared early in Imperial missions, now a great army seeking to establish a new galactic order, led by the reborn Revan himself. The campaign raised the level cap to 60, and takes place on two new worlds: Rishi, a tropical pirate haven on the edge of the galaxy, and Yavin 4 (which first appeared in the original Star Wars film), home of an ancient Sith warrior sect called the Massassi. Shadow of Revan was available for preorder. Players who preordered before November 2, 2014, received an experience boost that granted twelve times multiplicative experience for class-related missions, seven days of early access, a grand statue of Revan for placement in strongholds, and a free edition of Rise of the Hutt Cartel (to give to another player). The expansion was released on December 9, 2014.

The expansion is now free to play for all players.

=== Knights of the Fallen Empire ===
In June 2015, the third story expansion for the game, titled Knights of the Fallen Empire, was announced at EA's E3 2015 press conference. Knights of the Fallen Empire features a renewed focus on cinematic storytelling, as well as new planets, new companions, a dynamic story affected by player choices and a level cap of 65. A cinematic trailer, titled "Sacrifice", was released along with the initial announcement. The trailer, made by Blur Studio, received critical acclaim, and was awarded the "Best Trailer of E3" Award by IGN. The first nine chapters of Knights of the Fallen Empire were launched on October 27, 2015, with additional chapters starting in early 2016. Subscribers received one level 60 character token. After the release of Knights of the Fallen Empire, Rise of the Hutt Cartel and Shadow of Revan became free for those subscribing to the game, and access remains on the account if a subscription is canceled.

The release of Knights of the Fallen Empire depicts the story of "The Outlander"—the player character. The expansion introduced new companion characters available to all classes. One feature introduced with the expansion was the Alliance system. It entails recruiting allies, including some companions from other classes that formerly were restricted, from across the galaxy to join the fight against the Eternal Empire. Players were given the ability to strengthen their rebellion by providing resources to "Specialists" that oversee four areas of operation: Technology, Underworld Trade, Military and Force-Usage. Most of the early game content was heavily streamlined, allowing players to level up a character by completing solely story and class-specific missions if they so choose. A solo mode was also introduced for story-critical flashpoints. The new storyline, featuring primarily solo content, has 13 chapters.

=== Knights of the Eternal Throne ===
In December 2016, Knights of the Eternal Throne was released as the fourth story expansion and sixth major update that coincided with the game's five-year anniversary. A cinematic trailer, titled "Betrayed", was released along with the initial announcement of the expansion. The expansion continued the story of the Outlander. Subscribers received one level 65 character token, with additional tokens available at the cartel store. The storyline has nine chapters of solo content and it raised the level cap to 70. The expansion focused on defeating Empress Vaylin and the Eternal Empire. During the expansion, developers released several key updates and patches that continued the story and added new activities.

=== Onslaught ===
In April 2019, it was announced on the official site that the next expansion, Onslaught, would be released in September 2019. The expansion was to follow the new story that was begun with Jedi Under Siege. In August, it was announced that the release date for Onslaught had been moved back from September 2019 to October 22, 2019. Onslaught's release timeline (nearly three years) was the largest gap between expansions and major game updates which typically occurred annually. This expansion raised the level cap to 75.

=== Legacy of the Sith ===
In celebration of the game's ten-year anniversary, Legacy of the Sith was revealed as the eighth major expansion on July 2, 2021 in an official Twitch livestream. The expansion represents a continuation of the storyline from Onslaught, where the player pursues Darth Malgus across the galaxy to uncover his plans, while participating in a major battle on the ocean world of Manaan which has been invaded by the Sith Empire. The expansion raises the level cap to 80 and introduced revamped character creation, with expanded advanced classes where Force-user and Tech-user classes can utilize the other Force and Tech advanced classes and weapons and gain abilities based on light or dark alignment. The expansion was scheduled for release on December 14, 2021, free for subscribers, but its release date was postponed until February 15, 2022. A new cinematic trailer, titled "Disorder", was released on the same day as the expansion.

=== Masters of the Force ===
Masters of the Force is set to release in late 2026 as a comprehensive expansion for Star Wars: The Old Republic. The overhaul introduces several new gameplay mechanics and expands both the endgame content and the accessibility of the open world. At the center of these gameplay innovations is an increase in the level cap from level 80 to level 85. In connection with this, all disciplines will receive new abilities. This progression system is complemented by a new Gearing System tailored to the increased maximum level.

With this update, the developer introduces a dynamic difficulty system for the open world and the original class stories. Players can flexibly complete content across three tiers (Story, Veteran, and Master) to tailor the challenge to their individual preferences. In addition, the newly introduced Ventures system expands gameplay with optional special characters (Classic and Expert). These modes are aimed at players who want to experience the feel of the game's original launch phase, complete with specific progression goals, higher demands, and exclusive rewards.

In terms of group content, the three-part operation 'Children of Nul' expands the raid endgame for up to eight players. The operation will be available at launch in Story and Veteran variants, with a higher Master difficulty level to be added later. Alongside fixed instances, the new planet Ryloth features dynamic encounters—spontaneous group encounters and events in the open world.

== Cinematic trailers ==
Bioware released six short films as cinematic trailers for The Old Republic and its expansion packs.

- Deceived was released on June 1, 2009 and shows the Sith attack on the Jedi Temple on Coruscant ten years prior to the game.
- Hope was released on June 14, 2010 and shows the Battle of Alderaan 24 years prior to the game.
- Return was released on June 6, 2011 and shows the attack on a Republic space station over the ancient Sith homeworld Korriban, that started the war, 38 years prior to the game.
- Sacrifice was released on June 14, 2015 and depicts the story of Arcann and Thexan, twin heirs of Valkorion, Emperor of the Eternal Empire.
- Betrayed was released on October 7, 2016 and depicts the story of Vaylin.
- Disorder was released on February 15, 2022 and shows the Jedi Denolm Orr and Sa'har Kateen as they try to retrieve the holocron of Darth Nul, the creator of the Children of the Emperor.

The first five were later rereleased in 4K resolution.

== Other media ==
Chronicle Books released The Art and Making of Star Wars: The Old Republic in November 2011, which chronicles the creation of the game and includes concept artwork and interviews from the development team. The book was written by former Star Wars Insider editor Frank Parisi and BioWare writing director Daniel Erickson. The book includes a foreword by Penny Arcade's Mike "Gabe" Krahulik.

Leading up to game's release on December 20, BioWare released music tracks from the game each day which were not included with the soundtrack which came with the Collector's Edition of the game. The first track released was titled "The Mandalorian Blockade".

Razer released several peripherals based on the game to coincide with the launch date. The peripherals included custom made keyboards, mice, gaming headsets and mouse pads.

Between 2012 and 2014, LEGO released four sets based on the game, 9497 Republic Striker-class Starfighter, 9500 Sith Fury-class Interceptor, 75001 Republic Troopers vs. Sith Troopers and 75025 Jedi Defender-class Cruiser as part of its Lego Star Wars theme.

Electronic Arts later brought two Sith characters from the game into its mobile free-to-play turn-based RPG, Star Wars: Galaxy of Heroes, the Sith Marauder and eventually Darth Malgus himself.

== Reception ==
Reception

Aggregate scores
Aggregator	Score
GameRankings	84% (46 reviews)
Metacritic	85/100 (73 reviews)

Review scores
Publication	Score
1Up.com	B
Eurogamer	8/10; 4/10 (re)
G4	5/5
GameSpot	8.0/10
GameSpy	4/5
GamesRadar+	8 out of 10
GameTrailers	8.6/10
GameZone	8/10
IGN	9.0/10
PC Gamer (US)	93/100

Award
Publication	Award
GameSpy	Best MMO in 2011 Game of the Year Awards

Upon release, the game received praise for its voice acting and class story arcs, while criticism focused on repetitive endgame content and server queue issues. With a score of 85 on Metacritic and an 84% on GameRankings. G4TV gave a review of 5/5 and praised the game for "Top notch music and voice acting" and "hundreds of hours of content". PC Gamer gave a 93/100, praising the story, voice acting, and the amount of content available. GameSpy gave a review of 4/5, praising the story lines and companion system but criticising the "standard kill and fetch" quests. GameSpot gave the game 8.0/10, saying "[The Old Republic] isn't the next step in online role-playing games. Instead, it's a highly entertaining refinement of what has come before it." GamesRadar gave the game 8/10 calling it "an extremely satisfying experience that sets the stage for a bright future". The game has received a 9.0/10 "Amazing" rating from IGN. 1Up.com gave the game a B and stated: "The Old Republic is far from perfect, but no game since World of Warcraft has offered a similar experience with such a wide appeal."

During Star Wars: The Old Republic's launch week, long queue times were seen on some servers, with BioWare increasing population caps and adding more servers to attempt to resolve them. Some pre-order users discovered they had invalid registration codes. After release, at least one reviewer was less favorable as Eurogamer lowered their rating to a 4/10 from its initial high score.

MSNBC awarded Star Wars: The Old Republic game of the year. In 2012, The AbleGamers Foundation chose Star Wars: The Old Republic as their Mainstream Game for 2011 for being able to accommodate gamers with special needs. It praised the game's features which included many accessibility options, including full subtitles, queue-able actions, multiple action bars, area looting, auto looting, and built-in mouse sensitivity. During the 15th Annual Interactive Achievement Awards, the Academy of Interactive Arts & Sciences awarded The Old Republic with "Outstanding Achievement in Online Gameplay", along with receiving a nomination for "Role-Playing/Massively Multiplayer Game of the Year".

=== Daily Mail allegations ===
A story arc involving one character, a slave companion for the Sith Warrior named Vette, drew controversy. Writing for Kotaku, Mike Fahey, after playing the game, recalled some players boasting of their torturing of Vette with a shock collar and her low affection rating for them. This led to The Daily Mail publishing a story the following day alleging that the option to treat Vette decently was not popular or encouraged, citing Fahey's article as the authoritative source. The publication's story attracted a backlash of criticism and criticized for its lack of evidence and the selective information it presented from media outlets such as MCV, Destructoid, and Computer and Video Games. Religion Dispatches published a case study in response to the controversy, which analyses their findings from a survey of 369 players which asked how they chose to interact with Vette through roleplaying their player characters.
