= StarForge =

2014 video game

- Developer: codeHatch
- Publisher: codeHatch
- Engine: Unity
- Platform: Microsoft Windows
- Release: WW: September 18, 2014
- Genres: Action RPG; Simulation
- Modes: Single-player; multiplayer

StarForge is a 2014 video game developed by CodeHatch (stylised as Code}{atch) for Microsoft Windows. It is a Voxel-based Sandbox game that allows for customization of guns and building of bases. It is a game about gathering resources, building bases, crafting and surviving on an alien planet. The game was released 18 September 2014. On January 27, 2017, after numerous allegations of the game being abandoned and being an outright scam, StarForge was made free to download and removed from sale on Steam.

== Plot ==
The Sun is dying due to a sudden black hole formation in its decaying orbit and humans have transferred as much technology and resources as possible and left on a one way mission to populate another planet. It borrows elements from RTS, FPS, RPG, Voxel builder, Tower defense and Physics sandbox genres. The game is about life on the planet of Atlas where the gameplay character is living.

=== Lore ===
During the years 2073–2253, there was relative peace on Earth and most funds were diverted to exploration. Eventually small bases were set up on the Moon and Mars. However, a new problem arose when earthquakes started to occur, not just on Earth, but on the Moon and Mars as well. It was later discovered that a rogue black hole had entered into a decaying orbit with the Sun. The estimates in the game show that in less than a thousand years, the gravitational tidal forces would become too great for any planet in the Solar System to be habitable.

To deal with this oncoming catastrophe, the citizens of Earth created the New Space Initiative. Observatories scanned the galaxy for new habitable planets while archives of ones currently known were rechecked.

Finally, one planet was found and deemed habitable. It was named Atlas. At that time, scientists discovered how to make objects travel at almost the speed of light. However, even with the relativistic effects of near light-speed travel and medical advances in longevity, the planet was still too far away for any human to reach in one lifetime.

So, for the next 1000 years that were left, Earth sent resources to this new planet in hopes of one day sending humans there. Every corporation on Earth was required to send large quantities of equipment and weaponry. They were sent in freighters along with the sum total of human knowledge so that nothing would be forgotten. To help prepare the planet for habitation, robots were sent to seed the land with common trees, grasses, food, and shrubs.

After some time it was determined via the superluminal communicators carried by the freighters, that many of the supplies which had been sent were disappearing. Details were sparse on what was occurring, but it appeared that they were being taken by creatures that were acting in an intelligent way and these were the ones that arrived to begin with, many were lost on the way there for unknown reasons. Despite this fact, supplies continued to be sent as too much had already been invested to turn back. Finally, warp drive was invented, allowing man to travel into the depths of space within an instant.

In the year 3085, the gameplay character will have already left Earth, chosen through a lottery system to be part of Humanity's new home. With him aboard the Lifeships, countless others travel in their cryopods, sleeping with the dream that they will be able to wake up and have a second chance. He has been chosen as one of the advance scouts that will prepare the way for the others.

After being sent ahead of the massive Lifeships, contact with them was soon lost and to make matters worse, most of the advance scouts were hit by unexpected atmospheric turbulence on the way in, scattering everyone and everything and wrecking most of what you carried. The game starts right after the lore.

== Modes ==
=== Single-player ===
==== Survival ====
A sandbox game mode where the only objective is to survive on Atlas. The player may craft weapons, tilesets, and vehicles. The player can kill aliens and other players, find loot and explore the terrain. Players get spawn in the Vat.

=== Multiplayer ===
==== Fort Wars ====
In this mode, two teams create and defend their vat from the opposing team. The vat is the location that respawns players when they die. The game is over when one team wins by destroying the opposing team's vat.

=== Co-op ===
==== Fort Defense ====
In the fort defense mode, players must construct a base around a single vat and defend it from attacks by aliens. The attacks are in the form of waves and purely strategic. Waves, in strategy games, refer to batches of enemies. The aliens in the waves will increase in number and strength as the waves progress. If the vat is destroyed, then the game is lost. This gamemode has been removed in the final release.

== Reception ==
Player reception of the playable Alpha stage, which began on May 30, 2012, and ended on September 22, 2014, has been overwhelmingly negative, with the reasons cited by users ranging from dissatisfaction over update times, performance issues, a lack of progress, and frequent changes in prices, planned features, unconnected terrain and what some users feel are misleading product descriptions.

As of 27 June 2016, the full version of the game has received mostly negative reviews (16% positive, 84% negative) from Steam's community reviewers. Many of the positive reviews were given in the early stages of development. As of 27 June 2016 despite the negative reception, particularly after the release of version 1.0, the game was continuing to be promoted. As of March 9, 2016, it was the fourth-lowest rated game in Steam's catalog with only 18% positive ratings.

=== Reviews ===
There have been relatively few reviews of the full release of Starforge, perhaps due to its long Early Access period. Hooked Gamers wrote, "StarForge is an officially released game that feels a long, long way from completion", and scored the game 2.5/10. Since release, it has received mostly negative reviews on Steam, with 83% of all given review being negative as of May, 2016.

== Removal from Steam ==
On January 27, 2017, the game was pulled from the Steam store and a DRM free copy of the game was uploaded to the developer's website.

The developers also announced that they had no plans for further development of the game.
