= Kristoffer Tabori =

American actor and television director (born 1952)

- Born: Christopher Donald Siegel; August 4, 1952 (age 74); Malibu, California, U.S.
- Other names: K.T. Donaldson, Kris Tabori, Kristoffer Siegel-Tabori
- Occupations: Actor, television director
- Years active: 1958–present
- Spouse: Judy Geeson (m. 1984; div. 1989)
- Parent(s): Don Siegel; Viveca Lindfors

Kristoffer Tabori (born Christopher Donald Siegel; August 4, 1952) is an American actor and television director. He is also known as K.T. Donaldson.

== Early life ==
Tabori was born in Malibu, California, the son of American film director Don Siegel and Swedish-American actress Viveca Lindfors. He appeared in one of his mother's films, Weddings and Babies, as a young boy. In 1995, they appeared together in Last Summer in the Hamptons. His parents divorced in 1953 and Lindfors married Hungarian writer and director George Tabori. Kristoffer adopted his stepfather's surname and changed the English spelling of his forename.

== Career ==
He started his career as a stage actor in his teens in the late 1960s, and during the 1970s he appeared in many films, including John and Mary (1969), Pigeons (1971), Making It (1971), Journey Through Rosebud (1972) and Girlfriends (1978). The majority of his work, however, was in television drama, beginning with a notable role (Bert) in the TV film of Arthur Miller's A Memory of Two Mondays (1971). During the latter two decades, Tabori appeared in dozens of guest roles in many of the medium's most popular network shows, including Owen Marshall: Counselor at Law; Cannon; Marcus Welby, M.D.; The Rookies; The Streets of San Francisco; The Rockford Files; Barnaby Jones; Murder She Wrote; Tour of Duty; and TV miniseries including QB VII, Seventh Avenue, Brave New World and Strong Medicine.

Tabori continued to act on stage as well. In 1978 he played the title role in an acclaimed production of Hamlet directed by Liviu Ciulei, at Arena Stage in Washington, D.C. Washington Post drama critic Richard L. Coe described Tabori's Hamlet as "one of the finest I've seen in scores of them."

In 1988, he also played the part of Sir Henry Baskerville in a television production of The Hound of the Baskervilles next to Jeremy Brett as Sherlock Holmes and Edward Hardwicke as Dr. Watson. During the 1990s, Tabori began directing in television and has over forty shows, mostly episode dramas, to his credit. In 2007, Tabori directed the TV film Anna's Storm and episodes of Falcon Beach. In 2008, he directed episodes of The Guard and jPod. He directed the SyFy Channel aliens-Western film High Plains Invaders.

Tabori also has established a career in voice-only work. In 1989, he played Prof. Peter Plum in the first television series of Cluedo, where he was known for his loud protestations of innocence during the studio-based portions of the program. He also voiced HK-47, the assassin droid and comic relief character in the videogames Star Wars: Knights of the Old Republic and Star Wars: Knights of the Old Republic II: The Sith Lords. Tabori voices HK-47, HK-51, and HK-55 again in the 2010 MMORPG Star Wars: The Old Republic, as well as providing the voices for some characters in other Star Wars related products and in the Battlestar Galactica franchise.

Tabori was also featured on the radio program CBS Radio Mystery Theatre. On television, Tabori supplied the voice of War Minister and Emissary in Avatar: The Last Airbender and voiced several characters in The Adventures of Don Coyote and Sancho Panda as well as the home video series The Greatest Adventure: Stories from the Bible. In 2012, he also voiced the main villain character the Lord Regent Hiram Burrows in a popular stealth action adventure video game Dishonored.

He is an Audie Award-winning audiobook narrator and has performed in audio plays for Yuri Rasovsky, as well as performing the audiobook narration for Jeffrey Eugenides' Pulitzer prize winning novel Middlesex.

Tabori is the voice of the narrator, Miles, in the 1976 audiobook Invasion of the Body Snatchers by Jack Finney. His father, Donald Siegel, had directed the 1956 film version of the novel. In 2008, he voiced a major villain, The Vulture, in Spider-Man: Web of Shadows.

== Acting filmography ==
=== Film ===
Year	Title	Role	Notes
1970	The Sidelong Glances of a Pigeon Kicker	Oliver's boyfriend	
1971	Dirty Harry	Hippie Guy	Uncredited
1971	Making It	Phil Fuller	
1972	The Glass House		
1972	Family Flight	David Carlyle	ABC Movie of the Week
1972	Journey Through Rosebud	Drifter	
1987	G.I. Joe: The Movie	Mercer (voice)	Direct-to-video; Credited as Christopher Tabori
1994	Deep Down	Craig	
1995	Last Summer in the Hamptons	Nick Mora	
1996	Wildly Available	Joe Goodman	

=== Television ===
Year	Title	Role	Notes
1971	Nichols	Frankie	Episode: "The One-Eyed Mule"
1974	Cannon	Cliff Peril	Episode: "Flashpoint"
1974	The Rookies	Corey Banning	Episode: "Walk a Tightrope"
1974	QB VII	Ben Cady	ABC miniseries
1975	The Streets of San Francisco	Paul Kincaid	Episode: "Most Likely to Succeed"
1977	Seventh Avenue	Al Blackman	6-part NBC miniseries
1979	Rockford Files	Tim Ritchie	Episodes: "Only Rock 'n Roll Will Never Die: Part 1" & "Only Rock 'n Roll Will Never Die: Part 2"
1980	The American Short Story: United States	Giovanni	Episode: “Rappaccini's Daughter”
1980	Brave New World	John the Savage	3-hour television film
1984	The Facts of Life	Sam Hall	Episode: "Taking a Chance on Love"
1984	Murder, She Wrote	Phillip Carlson	Episode: "We're Off to Kill the Wizard
1985	The Twilight Zone	Kevin Drayton	Episode: "Her Pilgrim Soul"
1985	Murder, She Wrote	Ernest Fielding	Episode: "Sing a Song of Murder"
1986	The Greatest Adventure: Stories from the Bible	Young Jonah (voice)	2 Episodes
1986	Blacke's Magic	Garrett Chambers	Episode: "Wax Poetic"
1988	Tour of Duty	Capt. Larry Heath	Episode: "Under Siege"
1988	The Return of Sherlock Holmes	Henry Baskerville	Episode: "The Hound of the Baskervilles"
1989	Snoops	Richard Harrison	Episode: "The Sagittarian Candidate"
1989	Murder, She Wrote	Desmond	Episode: "Truck Stop"
1989-94	Matlock	Dr. Lowell Carr/Gary Carr	4 Episodes
1989	Quantum Leap	Byron	2 Episodes
1989	Boon	Jedediah Marshall	Episode: "One Reborn Every Minute"
1989	21 Jump Street	Father Jim Kelly	Episode: "Come from the Shadows"
1990	Cluedo	Professor Peter Plum	6 Episodes
1990	Designing Women	Darryl Morton	Episode: "A Blast from the Past"
1991	Jake and the Fatman	Donovan Bruce	Episode: "Second Time Around"
1992	In the Arms of a Killer	Dennis	TV film
1994	Murder, She Wrote	Dr. Swope	Episode: "Portrait of Death"
1996	The Lazarus Man	Dr. Dunleavy	Episode: "The Tartarus Wheel"
2005	Love on the Air	Director	Hallmark Original Movie / Starring Alison Sweeney & Jonathan Scarfe
2005-2007	Avatar: The Last Airbender	War Minister / Additional Voices; Emissary / Qin (voice)	3 Episodes

=== Video games ===
Year	Title	Voice role	Notes
2002	New Legends	Roa Khan / Prison Captain / Medic	
2003	Star Wars: Knights of the Old Republic	HK-47 / Jedi Knight / Republic Negotiator	
2003	Gladius	Usus	Credited as Kris Tabori
2004	EverQuest II	Makoto Shodo / Braeden Icehammer / Generic Ghost Froglok Enemy / others	
2004	Star Wars Knights of the Old Republic II: The Sith Lords	HK-47 / HK-50 / Geriel	
2005	Dungeons & Dragons: Dragonshard		
2006	Star Wars: Empire at War: Forces of Corruption	Garm Bel Iblis	Credited as Kris Tabori
2008	Star Wars: The Force Unleashed	Darth Desolous / Garm Bel Iblis / Kleef	
2008	Spider-Man: Web of Shadows	Vulture	Credited as Kristopher Tabori
2008	Tom Clancy's EndWar		
2010	Alpha Protocol	Grigori	
2011	Star Wars: The Old Republic	HK-47 / HK-51 / Agent Welkins	
2012	Ninja Gaiden 3	Additional V.O.	Credited as Kris Tabori
2012	Dishonored	Lord Regent Hiram Burrows	

== Directorial filmography ==
Year	Title	Notes
1996	Dead of Night	Directorial debut
1998	Magic Jersey	TV movie
2004	Pursued	
2006	The Accidental Witness	TV movie
2009	Fireball	TV movie
2009	High Plains Invaders	TV movie
2012	Goodnight for Justice: The Measure of a Man	TV movie
2013	Tom Dick & Harriet	TV movie
2013	The Carpenter's Miracle	TV movie
2013	Guess Who's Coming to Christmas	TV movie
2014	My Gal Sunday	TV movie
2014	A Ring by Spring	TV movie
2015	Portrait of Love	TV movie
2015	Just the Way You Are	TV movie
2015	Love on the Air	TV movie
2015	Murder, She Baked: A Plum Pudding Mystery	TV movie
2015	Debbie Macomber's Dashing Through the Snow	TV movie
2016	Murder, She Baked: A Peach Cobbler Mystery	TV movie
2016	Murder, She Baked: A Deadly Recipe	TV movie
2016	The Irresistible Blueberry Farm	TV movie
2017	Garage Sale Mystery: The Art of Murder	TV movie
2017	Murder, She Baked: Just Desserts	TV movie
2017	The Art of Us	TV movie
