= Michael Nolin =

American film director

- Born: December 7, 1950 (age 75); Manhattan, New York, United States
- Education: University of Southern California
- Occupations: Film director, screenwriter

Michael Nolin is an American former motion picture producer, former studio executive, former writer/director and current educator. Since 2003 he has been Professor of Film & Television and Dramatic Writing at SCAD in Savannah, Georgia.

== Production credits ==
His producing credits include Mr. Holland's Opus, which won a Christopher Award and for which Richard Dreyfuss was nominated for an Academy Award; Full Body Massage for director Nicolas Roeg; and the Independent Spirit Award-nominated 84 Charlie Mopic for writer/director Patrick Sheane Duncan. He wrote and directed Wildly Available, which premiered at the Hollywood Film Festival and was a runner-up for a Discovery Award. Nolin also co-wrote the teleplay for Maniac Magee, which was nominated for a Humanitas Prize.
