= Atton Rand =

Star Wars video game character

- Star Wars character
- Atton Rand's character model from Star Wars: Knights of the Old Republic II – The Sith Lords.
- First appearance: Star Wars: Knights of the Old Republic II – The Sith Lords (2004)
- Created by: Obsidian Entertainment
- Designed by: Brian Menze
- Voiced by: Nicky Katt

In-universe information
- Species: Human
- Origin: Alderaan

Atton Rand is a fictional character in Obsidian Entertainment's 2004 role-playing video game Star Wars: Knights of the Old Republic II – The Sith Lords. He is introduced as a sardonic human pilot encountered by the Jedi Exile on the Peragus mining facility, later joining the Exile's party as pilot of the Ebon Hawk.

Atton was conceived as a roguish companion in the tradition of Han Solo, but later story developments reveal that he had served as a soldier and Jedi hunter during the Jedi Civil War. LucasArts voice directors Will Beckman and Darragh O'Farrell said the developers considered a voice closer to a young Harrison Ford, but wanted the character to develop his own identity rather than function as a direct Solo imitation.

Commentary on Atton has focused on the contrast between his comic persona and concealed past, his role in The Sith Lords' treatment of moral ambiguity and war trauma, and restored content that gives his character arc additional closure. He is voiced by Nicky Katt, whose performance has been praised for combining Atton's sarcasm with emotional vulnerability.

== Conception and creation ==
The Sith Lords lead designer Chris Avellone said that one of the strengths of the first Star Wars: Knights of the Old Republic was its party companions, and that the sequel sought to give its companions deeper interaction through dialogue, skill checks, optional backstories, and an influence system in which companions could respond to the player character's movement toward the light or dark side of the Force. Atton was one of the companions designed around this approach.

Concept artist Brian Menze was asked to draw a character patterned on Han Solo, and based his first image of Atton on singer Robert Palmer, with clothing influenced by Solo's costume. During development, Atton was made younger than the original concept and was considered as a potential love interest for the player character.

The name Atton was originally an unused name from the development of Star Wars Jedi Knight: Jedi Academy; the released version of that game instead named its protagonist Jaden Korr. This history is referenced as an Easter egg in The Sith Lords.

=== Character ===
Atton was conceived as a roguish companion that follows the stock character archetype patterned after Han Solo, but his characterization subverts that archetype by revealing that his flippant persona conceals a history of violence, guilt, and avoidance. The character's role in the party also reflects The Sith Lords' broader companion design, in which party members are shaped through influence, optional dialogue, and the player's moral alignment.

Atton's evasiveness is expressed through humor, gambling, and verbal deflection. His interest in Pazaak is eventually connected to his training as a Jedi hunter, as he uses mental routines and card-game strategies to resist Jedi mind reading. His irreverent style also makes him a foil to Kreia, whose severity and philosophical lectures are frequently countered by Atton's sarcasm and suspicion.

=== Voice acting ===
Nicky Katt as he appeared in a 2000 film.

LucasArts voice directors Will Beckman and Darragh O'Farrell said they wanted the game's cast to preserve the "genuine Star Wars feel" of the first game. According to producer Chris Parker, the developers sought an actor reminiscent of a young Harrison Ford, but decided against making the character a straightforward imitation of Han Solo. Nicky Katt was ultimately cast as Atton, with Parker noting that Katt's appearance closely resembled how the developers had envisioned the character from the character's concept drawings. The voice directors thought Katt brought energy and personality to a dialogue-heavy role, particularly during the early portion of the game where Atton speaks frequently.

=== Cut content ===
A significant number of story material relating to Atton were cut from the shipped version of The Sith Lords, including a late-game confrontation with Darth Sion on Malachor V. The battle would have led to different story outcomes depending on his relationship with the player character and whether the player manages to defeat the Sith Lord as Atton. In one potential outcome, if the Exile is female, he would die from wounds inflicted by Sion if defeated in the boss battle, and as he lays dying in the Exile's arms, he confesses that he loved her all along.

Fan modders later restored this material as part of The Sith Lords Restored Content Modification (TSLRCM), a long-running project that assembled unused dialogue, voice acting, and game assets left in the game's files.

== Appearances ==
=== In The Sith Lords ===
Atton first appears imprisoned inside a force cage on the Peragus mining station. After the Exile frees him, he helps them escape the sabotaged facility and later joins the crew of the Ebon Hawk. He is initially presented as a wisecracking pilot, compulsive Pazaak player, and evasive companion who avoids emotional intimacy through humor, misdirection, and irritability.

Kreia later discovers Atton's hidden past and uses it to pressure him into remaining with the Exile. Through optional dialogue, the Exile learns that Atton formerly served under the Republic during the Mandalorian Wars and later followed Revan and Malak during the Jedi Civil War. As part of a Sith assassin unit, he was trained to resist Jedi powers, hunt Jedi, and break captured Jedi into servants of the Sith. Atton's disillusionment begins after he tortures a Jedi who identifies his own Force sensitivity and warns him that the Sith would turn him into one of their weapons if they discovered it. Before dying, she opens his mind to the Force as she experienced it. The encounter leaves him traumatized and guilt-ridden, leading him to desert and hide on Nar Shaddaa.

If the player gains sufficient influence with Atton, he confesses his past and can be trained as a Jedi Sentinel. His arc may be shaped by the player's choices: he can be encouraged toward redemption, hardened into greater cynicism, or drawn toward the dark side.

=== Other appearances ===
Outside The Sith Lords, Atton's later appearances and references have been limited. He is mentioned in Star Wars: The Old Republic and in several Star Wars reference works, including Jedi vs. Sith: The Essential Guide to the Force and The Complete Star Wars Encyclopedia. Wizards of the Coast also produced a miniature of Atton as part of its Knights of the Old Republic line for the Star Wars Miniatures game.

== Reception ==
=== Critical reception ===
Atton received generally positive retrospective commentary. Hilary Goldstein of IGN initially found Atton's early imitation of Han Solo irritating, but said later revelations about the character's darker past would surprise players and complicate his apparently ordinary surface. Discussing her attachment to the character as a player of Sith Lords, Jen Rothery of PCGamesN described Atton as "enigmatic, charming, and flirtatious", and argued that his story was part of The Sith Lords' larger interest in how individuals relate to the Force and deal with past actions. Sam Dunn of FanSided placed Atton among characters inspired by Han Solo, but argued that he occupied unusual territory because he was neither a smuggler, bounty hunter, nor pirate in the usual sense.

Critics have especially focused on the depth of Atton's arc. Fraser Brown of PCGamesN cited Atton as an example of a side quest that could feel as consequential as a main quest, recalling that player influence allowed Atton's personality and morality to be reshaped after his confession. Brown described the process of pushing Atton toward a more ruthless personality as morally disturbing but compelling. Phil Owen of Kotaku used Atton as an example of how The Sith Lords gives a sympathetic face to people who followed evil leaders, arguing that the game is filled with moral gray areas rather than the unambiguous heroic binary associated with much of Star Wars.

Katt's voice performance has also been discussed, with Atton singled out as a notable character played by Katt. Rothery credited Katt's performance as a major part of Atton's appeal. After Katt's death, PC Gamer described his performance as emphasizing Atton's mixture of wit, sarcasm, and vulnerability, and credited the role with leaving a lasting impression among players of The Sith Lords..

==== Restored content ====
The restored-content version of Atton's ending received particular attention. Several critics cited the restored material as important to understanding the emotional closure of Atton's character arc. William Hughes of The A.V. Club described the restored possibility of losing the Atton-versus-Sion fight as emotionally powerful because it allowed failure to produce a stronger narrative result than victory. Matthew Byrd of Den of Geek called Atton one of the game's most important characters and praised the restored Sion encounter for giving his arc a more satisfying conclusion. Luke Winkie of Paste cited Atton's restored content as an example of why fans were motivated to salvage unused material from the game's files, arguing that unfinished character arcs left a visible emotional gap in the original release.

=== Analysis ===
Commentary on Atton has focused on his role within The Sith Lords' critique of simple moral binaries. Travis Annabel of IGN argued that redemption is central to Star Wars storytelling, but observed that The Sith Lords presents its companions as morally compromised rather than straightforwardly altruistic; Atton is one of the characters whose past crimes place him inside that framework. Owen likewise argued that Atton shows how ordinary people in the setting may see Jedi and Sith as functionally similar forces whose conflicts devastate the wider galaxy. A GamesRadar article described the game as one that takes a universe of light and dark and paints it in shades of gray, comparing the Jedi and Sith conflict to a religious schism whose collateral damage falls on the wider galaxy.

Eamon Reid's thesis on class in the Star Wars universe uses Atton's dialogue about Nar Shaddaa to illustrate the displacement and exploitation of veterans and refugees after the Mandalorian Wars and Jedi Civil War. Reid argues that the refugee sector of Nar Shaddaa represents war's aftermath through unemployment, poverty, criminal exploitation, and the abandonment of people who fought on different sides of the galaxy's conflicts.

A 2019 CHI PLAY study by Julia Ayumi Bopp and colleagues surveyed 213 players about characters to whom they felt emotional attachment, identifying seven forms of attachment. In the study's examples, Atton appears under the "trusted close friend" theme, associated with trust, care, and worry.

==== Trauma, guilt, and redemption ====
Academic discussion has placed Atton within The Sith Lords' treatment of war trauma. Jorel Musa de Noronha Lemes and Rafael Licinio Tavares argue that the game foregrounds the lingering effects of the Mandalorian Wars and Jedi Civil War through planets, environments, and characters. They describe Atton as seeking redemption for his crimes during the Jedi Civil War by protecting the Exile, and read his initial emotional detachment as a protective shell formed around trauma and guilt. The same article compares Atton's storyline to depictions of trauma from the aggressor's side, emphasizing confrontation with one's own conscience rather than only the suffering of victims.

Luka Perušić's article on euthanasia in video games uses Atton's confession about killing a Jedi who awakened his Force sensitivity as an example of a morally complex act framed through retrospective narration. Perušić classifies the episode as a borderline case of voluntary euthanasia within the game's storytelling, because the player learns of the killing through Atton's account and must decide how to respond to him afterward.
