= The Sith Lords Restored Content Modification =

Video game mod

The Sith Lords Restored Content Modification (TSLRCM) is a fan volunteer effort to reinstate or recreate unused content for the 2004 video game Star Wars Knights of the Old Republic II: The Sith Lords and fix a vast number of technical issues present in the retail release of the game. A years-spanning project that aims to improve the gameplay experience of The Sith Lords as intended by its developer, TSLRCM is developed by a group of fans who pieced together disparate narrative elements through data extracted from the game's fragmented code, which contained innumerable unused original assets and voice-over recordings, and incorporated these alterations into the final product. The mod's first public release was in September 2009. As of 2015, the mod is endorsed and supported by Aspyr Media, Inc., an American video game developer and publisher responsible for the continued support of The Sith Lords on modern platforms.

TSLRCM has been acknowledged and praised by multiple video game publications as essential for a satisfactory gameplay experience of The Sith Lords, especially after the implementation of Steam workshop support for the game in July 2015. Multiple critics praised the additional character-driven content introduced or re-integrated by the mod as a feature highlight.

== History ==
Released on December 6, 2004, Star Wars Knights of the Old Republic II: The Sith Lords is the first game developed by Obsidian Entertainment, with a small core development team of seven former employees of Black Isle Studios led by Obsidian CEO Feargus Urquhart. Wanting to capitalize on the success of BioWare's 2003 video game Star Wars: Knights of the Old Republic, publisher LucasArts gave the team less than a year and a half to complete the project using the same engine and assets as its predecessor. According to Urquhart, the game was originally meant to be released in 2005, but it was later moved up to December 2004 following E3 2004. The team resorted to extensive overtime in order to meet the revised deadline. This meant that a lot of planned content in various states of completion was ultimately cut from the final retail release of the game.

While the game released to generally positive reviews from video game publications, the story arcs of several major characters were ambiguously explained and the game's ending sequences were heavily abbreviated, which left many players confused or dissatisfied. Besides the presence of disjointed story arcs as a result of cut content, The Sith Lords also launched with numerous software bugs, ranging from minor glitches like the same cutscene being played repeatedly, to major issues that would render the game unplayable for some players.

To restore the game's cut story content and resolve technical issues which remain unresolved by official patches, a group of players organized themselves as "Team Gizka" not long after the game's release and began development of an ambitious fan mod named The Sith Lords Restoration Project sometime in 2005. The mod is noted to be "unfinished but playable", as work on the project was eventually abandoned following lengthy delays and subsequent unexplained withdrawals from team members. Team Gizka's website had since been taken down and is no longer accessible. In response to the dissolution of Team Gizka, two players who met online were inspired to start their own content restoration project called The Sith Lords Restored Content Modification or "TSLRCM", which became more successful than Team Gizka's attempt.

== Gameplay ==
A mod for The Sith Lords, TSLRCM repurposes content extracted from the game's code like extra lines of dialogue or combat encounters which were unused by Obsidian, and made entire levels playable with fully integrated audio files and dialogue trees, such as a factory level for the HK-50 series of combat androids. Nearly two hours long in content, the player would take control of popular companion character HK-47 for the duration of the gameplay segment and wreak havoc on the industrial plant producing HK-50 units, which the character consider to be bastardized versions of himself. The mod fixes well over 500 bugs present in the retail release of The Sith Lords, including dialogue tree errors and combat or item glitches. A complete list of all restored content offered by TSLRCM was posted by a team member on the Deadly Stream online community. The mod alters the entire final sequence of the game; in the revised story scenarios introduced by TSLRCM, the player character encounters several party members and no longer traverses the final level alone.

Several characters are featured in a number of reintroduced plot scenarios that were originally cut from the final game. For example, companion character Atton Rand is instrumental in the participation of a boss fight, where the player assumes control of him to fight off major villain Darth Sion at a predetermined point in the narrative. The battle may lead to different outcomes depending on his relationship with the player character and whether the player manages to defeat the Sith Lord as Atton.

The most recent build of TSLRCM is compatible with the M4-78 Enhancement Project, a related mod which adds the "droid planet" M4-78 as a fully playable area with new or reintroduced story elements and characters.

== Development and release ==
The mod project's founders and co-leaders are Zbigniew "zbyl2" Staniewicz and DarthStoney. The goal of the project was to recreate the original vision that Obsidian had planned for The Sith Lords as closely as possible, with a focus on restoring content such as the HK-50 Factory area or expanded ending content, which still fit with the game's overall narrative but were cut due to time constraints. Staniewicz explained that there were story elements that were deliberately cut by Obsidian due to plot changes during the development, and so the team opted not to restore them. Although each of the project's team members reside in different countries, the time zone differences were a minor communication challenge and did not adversely impact the project. The amount of work each team member could contribute was dependent on how much free time they had; according to Staniewicz, real life obligations take priority, as team members put innumerable unpaid hours into the modding project out of their passion for the game's content.

Staniewicz has been involved in modding efforts for The Sith Lords since the mid-2000s. He credited his past experience working with the mod toolset for Neverwinter Nights for preparing him to navigate The Sith Lords's game engine. Staniewicz's initial modding efforts was motivated by his desire to restore the M4-78 planet, where the player is supposed to discover the Jedi Master Lonna Vash hiding from Sith assassins who are stalking Jedi across the galaxy. It was originally mentioned by the developers during pre-release interviews, but was cut in its entirety for the final version of The Sith Lords. Progress on the mod stalled for a time while Staniewicz was waiting for a writer to return scripts; around this time he made contact with DarthStoney, another member of the fan mod internet community. They became aware that Team Gizka's modding project had not made much progress, with no new content being released for years. Staniewicz and DarthStoney decided to collaborate on a restoration mod of their own, with the former utilizing his free time to work on the project while the M4-78 project was temporarily on hold, beginning with the restoration of content for the Dantooine area. The team eventually expanded after Staniewicz recruited additional help for tasks like beta testing and troubleshoot issues. The team eventually made a decision by consensus to widen the project's scope by restoring cut content on every planet in the game as well as fixing gameplay issues.

The team started from scratch for the project, with only custom animations from Team Gizka's project incorporated into TSLRCM. Staniewicz said the team would not use any existing work without the original creators' proper permission, and that it was not possible to contact most of the individuals who was involved with Team Gizka. The team used Team Gizka's publicly released cut content checklist for reference as it contained most of the game's major cut content, though they eventually discovered a significant amount of content not mentioned in the list on their own. Some items, mostly cut dialogue lines which were present in existing files but were removed from main conversation branch, were relatively easy to find. In other cases, the team had to pore through game voice files in order to find cut content, which took up a considerable amount of time and effort. Originally, Staniewicz and his team planned to fix one planet at a time and release the content as they were completed. Upon the completion of content for the Nar Shaddaa area, the team decided to keep going and release their work as a comprehensive mod encompassing all the cut content. According to Staniewicz, the modding process is intricate in effort, with the simple action of the location of a non-player requiring the modder to locate and note the character's coordinates when accessing the game, then leaving the game to input and modify the coordinates in a modding tool. The game would then had to be started back up to test if the action performed by the modding tool was successful by navigating towards the character's new location.

"All I know is that my game, which I pour my creativity and a ton of time into, is still around. I don't think I'd ever go back and play the originals as they are. I would see all of the things that were cut out of the game and probably get depressed because there'd be so much work to do".

— VarsityPuppet, Modding the Sith Lords: How Fans Salvaged KOTOR 2

According to VarsityPuppet, a team member who joined in 2008, he became aware of the game's modding potential through a friend and later found inspiration in Team Gizka's effort. Most of his time spent with TSLCRM involved developing content and troubleshooting issues for the HK-50 factory area, originally planned by Obsidian as an essential element of the story arc for HK-47. Although the player's party encounters HK-50 units as recurring enemies throughout the game's story, it is not possible to uncover their origins as intended by the developers. VarsityPuppet said he came to an understanding of HK-47's character in the game after going through the level's dialogue files in the game's code and felt it was good quality content that is worth restoring. While the first half of the HK Factory area as discovered in the game's code was more or less complete albeit with some minor camera issues and the lack of a proper conclusion, development of the second half went through several iterations prior to the mod's final release. VarsityPuppet noted that it was difficult for him to put together a coherent sequence of events that made sense with the code's unused voice lines and still worked well with the rest of the game for the mod's final release, hence some liberties were taken with the events of the plot. VarsityPuppet thought of the team's modding effort as "a director's cut vs theatrical cut of a film", and described his fascination of the discovery of cut content and the possible context behind it as if he was "digging for treasure". VarsityPuppet believed that until they have to listened to "every voice-over and looked through every asset in the game", there is potentially more content to discover from the game's source code.

TSLRCM entered open beta in September 2009. Following the release of a few versions of the TSLRCM, Staniewicz stepped away from the project while the rest of the team were working on the game's random loot system, as he believed he no longer had substantial feedback to offer for the development process. Staniewicz noted that the involvement of the other team members outside of its original founders meant progress on the project never ended up stalling. With the exception of developing patches for a major technical issue, the team indicated by July 2012 that any substantive content work would cease beyond Patch 1.8 as they felt that they had done much as they could for the game.

While the M4-78 Enhancement Project is fully compatible with the up-to-date version of TSLRCM, Staniewicz does not consider it to be part of the scope for TSLRCM, as there is very little dialogue relevant to the M4-78 area left in the code. Although TSLRCM team members used model assets that were left in game files and some plot points are based on what team members were able to recover from game dialog files, a significant amount of original content had to be created to flesh out the story arc for the M4-78 area. New voice overs were recorded for the original dialogue of the M4-78 project, while TSLRCM utilizes unused audio files left in the code. For example, Obsidian lead programmer Adam Brennecke voices a character on the planet M4-78EP, although the mod is not officially endorsed by Obsidian.

=== Support by Aspyr ===
In July 2015, Aspyr released an update for the Steam digital storefront version of The Sith Lords, which introduced integration with the Steam Workshop feature along with a significant updates such as controller support, Steam Achievements, and playability on Apple Macintosh, Linux and other platforms. Team members Staniewicz and Hassat Hunter were contacted by Aspyr a month before the update, with Aspyr product manager Michael Blair acknowledging TSLRCM to be an essential feature for the launch of The Sith Lords on modern PC platforms. Although Staniewicz was not directly involved, he provided feedback about achievements as well as suggestions about existing bugs that could be fixed. In order for the QA team to test "live" content from months of working on this update, they moved their Steam branches from beta to live two days before launch. During that time, Aspyr gave the TSLRCM team access as well as instructions on how to get their mod up in the Workshop, while ensuring it remained hidden from public view with testing by Aspyr's QA team underway. TSLRCM team members noted that their involvement as a result of Aspyr's initiative gave everyone involved a unique opportunity to resolve all remaining issues they could not perform as modders since Aspyr has the advantage of working with game's source code.

In December 2020, Staniewicz posted a mobile version of the mod for the iOS and Android ports of The Sith Lords developed by Aspyr.

In May 2022, a Nintendo Switch port of the game was announced. The announcement also teased the mod as free downloadable content (DLC). The port, released on June 8, 2022, originally stated that TSLRCM was forthcoming as DLC. However, on June 2, 2023, Aspyr confirmed that the DLC had been cancelled. In December 2025, after a lawsuit involving Aspyr went public, it was revealed that Aspyr was unable to secure permission from all 22 people involved with the original mod and that Disney preferred to credit the developers' original names rather than their gamertags.

== Reception ==
The Sith Lords Restored Content Modification has received a very positive reception from players and critics. In 2014, it ranked tenth place in the Player's Choice award category in the 13th Annual Mod of the Year Awards organized by Mod DB. In September 2015, Paste Magazine published an article authored by Luke Winkie, where he documented his survey of multiple players who spoke of their positive experiences of the mod. By December 2019, TSLRCM had amassed more than 400,000 subscribers on the Steam Workshop.

Multiple critics gave credit to the mod for enhancing gameplay experience of The Sith Lords, a game widely considered to be laudable for its content but flawed in aspects of its execution. Winkie noted that there is "something spiritual" about returning to a beloved video game with better context. Robert Purchese from Eurogamer highlighted the significance of The Sith Lords being given Steam Workshop support as this meant better accessibility to the "revered" TSLRCM, which in his view "effectively finishes an unfinished game, in a development sense, restoring all the dormant content found on the game's disc". Calling The Sith Lords a "diamond in the rough" and a "tarnished gem", Purchese noted that The Sith Lords succeeded in generating a fervent amount of fan loyalty unmatched by its predecessor. He welcomed the ease of access to TSLRCM provided by Steam Workshop as of 2015, and said that players no longer need to "slog through the conclusion alone", which culminates in an unfulfilling final encounter. Nathan Grayson from Kotaku welcomed the integration of the mod to Steam Workshop and called it a "must-download" which improves upon the retail release of The Sith Lords, a product he considered to be "sloppy, stitched together" product due to publisher pressure and time constraints. Jared Nelson from TouchArcade lauded TSLRCM as a highly polished fan labour work refined over the course of a decade, and expressed excitement at being able to play through the restored content offered by TSLRCM on the mobile port of The Sith Lords.

Byrd and Winkie cited the TSLRCM project as proof of the dedication from the game's fanbase to salvage unused assets buried within the game's code and fix the narrative arcs for characters like Atton. Winkie remarked that it is "almost criminal that players didn't get to watch these scenes pay off on the disc. These characters meant something to people. Putting them out to pasture in crunchtime isn't fair". He further suggested and that in the absence of a proper third instalment to the Knights of the Old Republic, a "self-made mod is all they'll get". In an article written for Gamasutra, Bryant Francis felt that the restored content successfully did justice to several characters from The Sith Lords, such as HK-47 and Kreia, as well as a more nuanced and interesting depiction of the Sith organization as a "complicated, nuanced political group rather than an embodiment of raw evil" as intended by the developers. William Hughes from The A.V. Club said Atton's death at the hands of Darth Sion, a potential scenario restored by the TSLRCM mod, turned to be a profoundly sad and moving moment for him. He remarked that if he had persisted on winning the boss fight as Atton and deliberately refused to lose, he would have missed out on that experience, and that a deliberate choice to lose a gameplay challenge made for a better story than a win "ever possibly could" for him. Jen Rothery from PCGamesN was motivated to complete The Sith Lords after she last played the game more than a decade ago, and enjoyed the additional character moments she experienced with Atton Rand. Rothery remarked that while the TSLRCM gave her closure as she had declined to finish the game due to her discovery of Atton's endgame content being removed in the final release, she did appreciate the original release of the game just as deeply during her younger years and that she funneled the emotional impact the game had on her "through the lens of romantic obsession".

Chris Avellone, the lead writer of The Sith Lords, has praised TSLRCM for its quality. On one occasion, Avellone said he respects its team of modders for their dedication as well as willingness to "experiment with gameplay and narrative aspects" of Obsidian's titles, which he felt is something meant to be "shared, improved upon, and whenever possible".
