= American Symphony (disambiguation) =

American Symphony is a 2011 work by American composer Adam Schoenberg.

American Symphony could also refer to:

- "An American Symphony", the title track for the finale symphonic piece played at the end of the 1995 film Mr. Holland's Opus
- American Symphony (film), a 2023 American documentary film about musician Jon Batiste, directed by Matthew Heineman

== See also ==
- Afro-American Symphony, a 1930 composition by William Grant Still
- American Symphony Orchestra, a New York–based American orchestra founded in 1962 by Leopold Stokowski
- American Youth Symphony, an orchestra based in Los Angeles, California
