= Nicky Katt =

Actor (1970–2025)

- Katt in Boiler Room (2000)
- Born: Agustin Islas Katt; May 11, 1970; Acapulco, Guerrero, Mexico
- Died: c. April 8, 2025 (aged 54); Burbank, California, U.S.
- Occupation: Actor
- Years active: 1980–2018
- Spouse: Annie Morse (m. 1999; div. 2001)

Agustin Islas "Nicky" Katt (May 11, 1970 – c. April 8, 2025) was an American and Mexican actor. He began his career as a child actor, and as an adult, frequently played unsympathetic characters or villains. He was known for his starring role as Harry Senate on the television series Boston Public (2000–2002), and his work with directors Richard Linklater and Steven Soderbergh, including subUrbia (1996), Dazed and Confused (1993) and The Limey (1999).

In addition to Linklater and Soderbergh, Katt played prominent supporting roles in multiple films by Robert Rodriguez and Christopher Nolan, including Insomnia (2002) and Sin City (2005). His other film credits included A Time to Kill (1996), Boiler Room and The Way of the Gun (both 2000), and Secondhand Lions (2003).

== Early life ==
Katt was born Agustin Islas in Acapulco, Mexico, on May 11, 1970, the son of American costume designer Carol Katt and Mexican musician Agustín Islas, the bassist for the Mexican rock band El Klan. He was raised in the Los Angeles area, attending St. Paul's Lutheran School in North Hollywood before graduating from Providence High School in Burbank.

== Career ==
Katt began his career as a child actor, professionally taking his mother's surname. He adopted the name Nicky at the suggestion of comedian Harvey Korman. He made his career debut in a 1980 episode of the television series Fantasy Island, followed by his first film role in Underground Aces (1981), and further TV roles in episodes of CHiPs, Father Murphy, and V.

As an adult, he was known for his role as unorthodox teacher Harry Senate on David E. Kelley's Fox drama series Boston Public. He was often cast as a villain, including as a murderous cop on the take in Monk, an irascible motorhead in Dazed and Confused, an ill-fated white supremacist child rapist in A Time to Kill, and an embittered business rival in Boiler Room. Katt's other roles include Tim in SubUrbia (1996), Stacy the hitman in The Limey (1999), Adolf Hitler in Full Frontal (2002), Fred Duggar in Insomnia (2002), Stuka in Sin City (2005), and Nate Petite in Snow Angels (2008). He voiced the character Atton Rand in Star Wars Knights of the Old Republic II: The Sith Lords.

In 2004, he appeared in the Off-Broadway production of the Woody Allen play A Second Hand Memory.

Katt's last acting appearance was a 2018 episode of the television series Casual. In 2020, he participated in a virtual table read with the cast of Dazed and Confused.

== Personal life ==
Katt was married to Annie Morse from 1999 until their divorce in 2001. He resided in Ben Lomond, California, in his final years, where he cared for his mother until her death in 2023.

== Death ==
Katt was found dead by his landlord who went to collect his overdue rent on April 8, 2025, at his home in Burbank, California. He was 54, and had died by suicide by hanging. Katt appeared to have been dead for several days before his body was discovered.

Several of Katt's former collaborators paid tribute to the actor. Richard Linklater wrote, "Nicky had a deep love for the character actors of cinema history, and I think saw himself that way...I think he probably over-filled all his roles, which makes him memorable...That brilliant spark will be missed." Robert Rodriguez said, "Nicky was an absolute joy on and off the camera. A true artist. A friend."

== Filmography ==
=== Film ===
| Year | Title | Role | Notes | Ref. |
|---|---|---|---|---|
| 1981 | Underground Aces | Son | | |
| 1984 | Gremlins | Schoolchild | | |
| 1989 | The 'Burbs | Steve Kuntz | | |
| 1990 | Martians Go Home | Hippie | | |
| 1992 | Sister Act | Waiter | | |
| 1993 | Dazed and Confused | Clint Bruno | | |
| 1993 | American Yakuza | Vic | | |
| 1995 | The Doom Generation | Carnoburger Cashier | | |
| 1995 | The Cure | "Pony" | | |
| 1995 | Strange Days | Joey Corto | | |
| 1995 | The Babysitter | Mark | | |
| 1996 | A Time to Kill | Billy Ray Cobb | | |
| 1996 | subUrbia | Tim | | |
| 1996 | Johns | "Mix" | | |
| 1997 | Nowhere | Scary Drag Queen | (as Nicolette Gato) | |
| 1997 | Batman & Robin | "Spike" | | |
| 1998 | Phantoms | Deputy Steve Shanning | | |
| 1998 | One True Thing | Jordan Belzer | | |
| 1998 | Delivered | Barry | | |
| 1999 | The Limey | Stacy | | |
| 2000 | Boiler Room | Greg Weinstein | | |
| 2000 | Rules of Engagement | Hayes Lawrence Hodges III | | |
| 2000 | The Way of the Gun | Obecks | | |
| 2001 | Waking Life | Himself | | |
| 2002 | Insomnia | Detective Fred Duggar | | |
| 2002 | Full Frontal | Hitler | | |
| 2002 | Speakeasy | Frank Marnikov | | |
| 2003 | I Love Your Work | Goateed Man | | |
| 2003 | Secondhand Lions | Stan | | |
| 2003 | School of Rock | "Razor" | | |
| 2004 | Riding the Bullet | Ferris | | |
| 2005 | Sin City | Stuka | | |
| 2006 | World Trade Center | Volunteer Fireman | | |
| 2007 | Snow Angels | Nate Petite | | |
| 2007 | Planet Terror | Joe | | |
| 2007 | Death Proof | Counter Guy | | |
| 2007 | The Brave One | Detective Vitale | | |
| 2008 | Harold | Police Officer #1 | | |
| 2008 | The Dark Knight | S.W.A.T. Member | Uncredited | |
| 2011 | The Sitter | NYPD Officer | | |

=== Television ===
| Year | Title | Role | Notes | Ref. |
|---|---|---|---|---|
| 1980 | Fantasy Island | Bookie | Episode: "The Devil and Mandy Breem/Instant Millionaire"; uncredited | |
| 1981 | CHiPs | Pat McGuire | Episode: "Diamond in the Rough" | |
| 1981 | Father Murphy | Chester | 2 episodes | |
| 1982 | Code Red | Kenny | Episode: "Burnout" | |
| 1982 | Herbie, the Love Bug | Matthew MacLane | 5 episodes | |
| 1982 | Voyagers! | Jack, The Artful Dodger | Episode: "The Day the Rebs Took Lincoln" | |
| 1982 | Trapper John, M.D. | Scott Spencer | Episode: "The Good Life" | |
| 1983 | Quincy, M.E. | Jeff Reano | Episode: "Suffer the Little Children" | |
| 1984 | V | Sean Donovan | 2 episodes | |
| 1984 | The Get Along Gang | Leland Lizard (voice) | 7 episodes | |
| 1984 | CBS Schoolbreak Special | Jeff Anastas | Episode: "Contract for Life: The S.A.D.D. Story" | |
| 1988 | The Facts of Life | Mark | Episode: "Present Imperfect" | |
| 1989–1990 | Dear John | Amorous Male Student | 2 episodes | |
| 1990 | Lifestories | Paul Albertson | Episode: "The Hawkins Family" | |
| 1991 | Uncle Buck | Tommy | Episode: "In Tia We Trust" | |
| 1992 | Love & War | Clerk | Episode: "Bustiers and Body Points" | |
| 1994 | Knight Rider 2010 | Johnny | Television film | |
| 1995 | Double Rush | Nicky | Episode: "The Show We Wrote the Day We Found Out We Were Going on Opposite Roseanne" | |
| 1996 | Friends | Arthur | Episode: "The One with the Bullies" | |
| 1996 | Kindred: The Embraced | Starkweather | Episode: "Nightstalker" | |
| 2000–2002 | Boston Public | Harry Senate | 49 episodes | |
| 2003 | The Guardian | Evan Piscarek | 2 episodes | |
| 2003–2004 | King of the Hill | Various voices | 3 episodes | |
| 2006 | Monk | Sergeant Ryan Sharkey | Episode: "Mr. Monk and the Captain's Marriage" | |
| 2006 | Love Monkey | Nathan Kitt | Episode: "Confidence" | |
| 2007 | Law & Order | Isaac "Iced Out Ike" Krantz | Episode: "Bling" | |
| 2013 | Behind the Candelabra | Mr. Y | Television film | |
| 2018 | Casual | Cyril | Episode: "Polytropos"; final role | |

=== Video games ===
| Year | Title | Voice role | Notes | Ref. |
|---|---|---|---|---|
| 2004 | Star Wars Knights of the Old Republic II: The Sith Lords | Atton Rand | | |
