= The Mr. Holland's Opus Foundation =

US non-profit organization

Mr. Holland’s Opus Foundation is a U.S. nonprofit 501(c)(3) organization established in 1996 by composer Michael Kamen to promote music education in underserved K-12 schools. Inspired by the film Mr. Holland's Opus, the foundation provides musical instruments and vital support services to under-funded school music programs across the United States. Headquartered in Burbank, California, Mr. Holland’s Opus Foundation works to ensure that economically disadvantaged youth have access to the benefits of music education, which in turn supports their academic success and creative expression. As of 2025, the foundation has donated over 41,000 instruments (valued at more than $37 million) to nearly 2,000 schools in 49 states, Washington, D.C., and Puerto Rico, benefiting over 500,000 students nationwide. Charity evaluators have consistently rated the organization highly for its accountability and impact (Charity Navigator awarded it a four-star rating).

== History ==
Michael Kamen founded Mr. Holland's Opus Foundation in 1996 after scoring the 1995 film Mr. Holland's Opus, which depicted a dedicated music teacher's influence on students. Kamen’s goal was to address the gap in school music budgets by getting instruments into the hands of students who could not afford them. In 1998, Felice Mancini (the daughter of composer Henry Mancini), became president and CEO of the foundation. Under Mancini's 25-year tenure, the foundation grew from a small operation with a six-figure budget into a nationally prominent foundation with an annual budget over $6 million. By 2023, the foundation had invested more than $34 million in instruments for thousands of school music programs, dramatically expanding its reach. Mancini cultivated lasting partnerships with donors, artists, and corporate sponsors, helping Mr. Holland's Opus Foundation become, as its board described, "the most admired music education foundation" in the country. In 2016, her efforts were recognized with the National Arts Education Award from Americans for the Arts.

In April 2024, Tricia Williams – a longtime Mr. Holland's Opus Foundation program director – was appointed as president and CEO. A musician and Berklee College of Music graduate, she has been with the foundation since 1999, and, in 2017, created Music (and Arts) Education District Support Services (MEDSS®), a program providing district-level support for music and arts education. As CEO, she is leading the foundation’s expansion to reach students in need nationwide.

Over the years, the foundation's work has garnered support from many prominent musicians and philanthropists. Rock guitarist Eddie Van Halen was a devoted supporter for over a decade. In 2012, Van Halen donated 75 of his personal guitars to low-income school programs through the foundation, expressing that giving children the gift of music was tremendously important. After his death in 2020, it was revealed that Van Halen had left a multi-million dollar bequest to the foundation in his will – a contribution described by the organization as "transformative." His son Wolfgang Van Halen has continued the family's legacy with the foundation.

Country stars Morgan Wallen, Chris Stapleton and Keith Urban, blues-rock band Tedeschi Trucks Band, rock icon Alice Cooper, Grammy-winning alternative group Portugal. The Man, Cypress Hill rapper B-Real, and legendary producer Bob Ezrin have contributed or served on the foundation's board, reflecting broad music industry engagement.

== Programs and initiatives ==
Mr. Holland’s Opus Foundation's core mission is carried out through several programs and initiatives that support music education at the school and district level:

- Instrument donation grants: The foundation's primary activity is donating new musical instruments to under-resourced schools that lack adequate instruments for economically disadvantaged students. Schools apply and are vetted based on criteria such as having an existing music program, a dedicated music teacher, and a high percentage of low-income students. The foundation conducts a thorough assessment of each applicant school’s needs and capacity before awarding a grant of instruments. By increasing a school’s inventory of playable instruments, the program enables more students to participate in band, orchestra, jazz, or other ensembles who otherwise could not due to cost barriers. The foundation has donated over 41,000 instruments to more than 1,900 schools in all 50 states. These donations serve students for at least ten years on average (the typical lifespan of instruments in schools) and have an estimated retail value exceeding $37 million as of 2025. In the 2024–25 fiscal year alone, the foundation provided 2,284 instruments to 72 schools, worth about $2.36 million.
- Music Education District Support Services (MEDSS): Launched in 2017 by Mr. Holland’s Opus Foundation, MEDSS is a consulting and assessment program designed to help school districts identify and reduce barriers to student participation in music and arts education. Working with district leaders and arts administrators, MEDSS evaluates systemic challenges such as insufficient staffing, scheduling conflicts, inequities between schools, and lack of instruments or resources. The process includes data analysis, teacher surveys, and inventory audits, culminating in recommendations to improve access and quality. Findings guide both district actions and the foundation's own investments, such as targeted instrument donations. As of 2025, MEDSS had been implemented in over 30 districts nationwide, with some requesting follow-up assessments to track progress. Participating districts have secured more than $14 million in new public funding, added music teacher positions, and launched new programs based on MEDSS recommendations. In Tennessee, the CMA Foundation funded a statewide initiative to expand the model to every district. The program has been credited with improving equitable access to music education in several communities across the nation.
- Disaster Relief: Music Rising is a disaster relief fund administered by Mr. Holland's Opus Foundation to restore school music programs affected by natural disasters. It was originally co-founded in 2005 by U2 guitarist The Edge and producer Bob Ezrin in response to Hurricane Katrina, with an initial focus on replacing instruments in the Gulf Coast region. The program later expanded nationwide, and in 2025, Mr. Holland’s Opus Foundation established the National Music Education Disaster Relief Coalition with partners including CMA Foundation, Gibson Gives, Guitar Center Music Foundation, Music For All, Music Will, NAfME, NAMM Foundation, The Recording Academy, and Save the Music Foundation. Schools with active music programs prior to a disaster may apply for replacement instruments if insurance or FEMA funds are delayed or unavailable. As of 2025, the foundation has provided about $2.7 million in instruments to more than 100 schools recovering from hurricanes, floods, wildfires, and other disasters.

== Impact and recognition ==
Over more than three decades, Mr. Holland's Opus Foundation has had a substantial impact on music education in America's public schools. As of 2025, the foundation had distributed more than 41,000 instruments to more than 1,930 schools, with a cumulative retail value of over $37 million in donated resources. These grants have given over 500,000 economically disadvantaged students the opportunity to participate in their school’s music program when they otherwise might have been unable to because of financial constraints. The infusion of instruments eliminates students having to share instruments (and mouthpieces), enables music classes to expand enrollment and improves the overall quality of music education (for instance, replacing aging, unplayable instruments with new ones). The foundation's district-level interventions (through MEDSS) have led to systemic changes, such as districts hiring additional music teachers and allocating new funding for music and arts programs, which benefits future generations of students.

The foundation's work has earned widespread recognition in both the education and philanthropic sectors. In addition to the Americans for the Arts award in 2016, Mr. Holland’s Opus Foundation has consistently achieved top ratings from charity watchdog organizations. Charity Navigator, the major U.S. charity evaluator, has awarded the foundation a four-star rating (its highest) for financial health, accountability, and transparency. As of 2025, Charity Navigator scored Mr. Holland’s Opus Foundation at 100% overall, including a maximum score in accountability and a strong program expense ratio, indicating that the vast majority of its budget directly supports its mission. GuideStar (Candid) also recognizes the foundation with a Platinum Seal of Transparency.

Media outlets have highlighted the foundation's achievements and notable donations. In 2022, NPR's Morning Edition reported on Eddie Van Halen’s posthumous gift to Mr. Holland's Opus Foundation, noting the guitarist's commitment to "passing on music skills to kids" and lauding the multi-million dollar donation's potential to change many students' lives.

The foundation's 20th and 25th anniversaries were marked by press coverage reflecting on its longevity and the enduring relevance of its mission (stemming from the film that inspired it).

Mr. Holland's Opus Foundation has collaborated with other respected music charities and educational organizations (such as those in the disaster relief coalition formed by the foundation), further boosting its profile as a leader in the music education nonprofit space.
