= Mr. Holland's Opus =

1995 American drama film by Stephen Herek

- Theatrical release poster
- Directed by: Stephen Herek
- Written by: Patrick Sheane Duncan
- Produced by: Ted Field; Robert W. Cort; Michael Nolin; Patrick Sheane Duncan
- Starring: Richard Dreyfuss; Glenne Headly; Jay Thomas; Olympia Dukakis
- Cinematography: Oliver Wood
- Edited by: Trudy Ship
- Music by: Michael Kamen
- Production companies: Hollywood Pictures; Interscope Communications; PolyGram Filmed Entertainment
- Distributed by: Buena Vista Pictures Distribution (North America); PolyGram Filmed Entertainment (International)
- Release date: December 29, 1995
- Running time: 143 minutes
- Country: United States
- Languages: English; American Sign Language
- Budget: $31 million
- Box office: $106.3 million

Mr. Holland's Opus is a 1995 American drama film directed by Stephen Herek, produced by Ted Field, Robert W. Cort, and Michael Nolin, and written by Patrick Sheane Duncan. The film stars Richard Dreyfuss in the title role of Glenn Holland, a dedicated high school music teacher who attempts to compose his own music while struggling to balance his job and life with his wife and profoundly deaf son. The cast also includes Glenne Headly, Olympia Dukakis, William H. Macy, and Jay Thomas.

The film received positive reviews and was a box office success. It was nominated for the Golden Globe Award for Best Screenplay in 1995. Richard Dreyfuss received nominations for the Golden Globe Award for Best Actor – Motion Picture Drama and the Academy Award for Best Actor.

== Plot ==
In the fall of 1964, 30-year-old Glenn Holland is a talented musician and composer living in Portland, Oregon. He decides to take a position as a music teacher at John F. Kennedy High School, so he can spend more time with Iris, his young wife and work on a symphony he has been composing for some time. The film covers his 30-year teaching career, set against the backdrop of a changing American society.

Holland at first struggles in his new job, but soon learns how to connect with his students by using rock and roll and other popular music to convince them that music is a fun and worthwhile pursuit. He becomes a popular teacher at the school and rises to the task of creating a school marching band with help from the football coach, Bill Meister, with whom he becomes lifelong friends. Holland persuades principal Helen Jacobs to maintain funding for the school's arts programs, despite a shrinking budget and the objections of vice principal Gene Wolters.

The time Holland devotes to his classes, the marching band, orchestra, productions and mentoring both struggling and talented students leaves him little time to work on his symphony, or to spend with his family. When his young son, Cole, is discovered to be deaf, Holland is severely disappointed that he will never be able to share his love of music. He fails to learn American Sign Language properly, leaving him unable to communicate with his son and creating a rift between himself and Iris, who is raising Cole mostly by herself. As the years progress, Holland grows closer to his students at Kennedy High and more distant from his own son.

While directing a school musical, Holland develops an emotionally intimate relationship with Rowena Morgan, a talented student who dreams of performing in New York. Rowena asks him to leave with her, and Holland considers doing so, but ultimately chooses to remain with Iris and Cole and sends Rowena to New York alone.

In 1980, following the murder of John Lennon, an argument with Cole, now in his teens, finally makes Holland realize the error of his ways. He learns to communicate with his son and discovers ways to help him experience the music he can't hear and repairs his relationship with Iris.

In 1994, Wolters, now principal of Kennedy High, ends the school's arts programs, citing further cuts from the Board of Education and the need to prioritize reading, writing and math. Holland is laid off as a result. He makes an impassioned plea to the school board to no avail; he becomes cynical and despondent, believing that his 30 years as a teacher has amounted to nothing. On his last day at school, Iris and Cole, now a teacher himself, help Holland clear out his office and quietly leave the otherwise empty school. Hearing music in the auditorium, Holland finds it packed full of current and former students who greet him with a standing ovation. Gertrude Lang, a struggling clarinetist from Holland's first year teaching is now Governor of Oregon; she gives a speech praising Mr. Holland for the lives he changed over 30 years, including her own. The Governor joins past members of the school's orchestra, who have secretly been practicing Holland's symphony, on stage. A tearful Mr. Holland conducts them in the premiere performance of his symphony.

== Cast ==
- Richard Dreyfuss as Glenn Holland, a composer who becomes a music teacher at John F. Kennedy High School.
- Glenne Headly as Iris Holland, Glenn's wife.
- Jay Thomas as Bill Meister, the gym teacher and coach of John F. Kennedy High School's football & wrestling teams and Glenn's close friend.
- Olympia Dukakis as Principal Helen Jacobs, the principal of John F. Kennedy High School, who retires in 1972.
- William H. Macy as Vice Principal Gene Wolters, the vice-principal of John F. Kennedy High School who later becomes principal in 1972.
- Alicia Witt as Gertrude Lang, an aspiring clarinet player who eventually becomes the Governor of Oregon.
  - Joanna Gleason as adult Gertrude Lang
- Jean Louisa Kelly as Rowena Morgan, a talented singer who has a crush on Mr. Holland and desires to embark on a singing career.
- Terrence Howard as Louis Russ, a football player and wrestler who becomes a bass drum player in the marching band. After graduation, he serves in the Armed Forces, presumably in the Army, presumably in the infantry, sent to South Vietnam, where he is killed in action.
- Damon Whitaker as Bobby Tidd, one of Glenn's students.
  - Forest Whitaker as adult Bobby Tidd (uncredited)
- Alexandra Boyd as Sarah Olmstead, a drama teacher.
- Anthony Natale as Coltrane "Cole" Holland (age 28), Glenn and Iris's son, who is 90% deaf.
  - Joseph Anderson as Coltrane "Cole" Holland (age 15)
  - Nicholas John Renner as Coltrane "Cole" Holland (age 6)
- Beth Maitland as Deaf School Principal, the principal of a deaf school where Cole is enrolled.

== Production ==
Principal photography took place in Portland, Oregon in the summer of 1994, with Grant High School as a primary location. The Vietnam War Memorial, Washington Park, and Darcelle's nightclub were used as additional locations.

== Music ==
The film features an orchestral score by Michael Kamen and many pieces of classical music. Kamen also wrote An American Symphony ("Mr. Holland's Opus"), the work on which Mr. Holland is shown working throughout the movie. Kamen's arrangement won the 1997 Grammy for Best Instrumental Arrangement.

=== Soundtrack releases ===
Two soundtrack albums were released for this film in January 1996. One is the original motion picture score, and includes all of the original music written for the film by Michael Kamen. The second album is a collection of popular music featured in the film:

1. "Visions of a Sunset" – Shawn Stockman (of Boyz II Men)
2. "1-2-3" – Len Barry
3. "A Lover's Concerto" – The Toys
4. "Keep On Running" – Spencer Davis Group
5. "Uptight (Everything's Alright)" – Stevie Wonder
6. "Imagine" – John Lennon
7. "The Pretender" – Jackson Browne
8. "Someone to Watch Over Me" – George and Ira Gershwin
9. "I Got a Woman" – Ray Charles
10. "Beautiful Boy (Darling Boy)" – John Lennon
11. "Cole's Song" – Julian Lennon and Tim Renwick
12. An American Symphony ("Mr. Holland's Opus") – London Metropolitan Orchestra and Michael Kamen

== Reception ==
=== Box office ===
In the United States, gross domestic takings totaled US$82,569,971. International takings are estimated at US$23,700,000, for a gross worldwide takings of $106,269,971.

=== Critical ===
Mr. Holland's Opus holds a 76% "Fresh" rating from 29 reviews at Rotten Tomatoes. The site's consensus states: "A feel-good story brought to life by a terrific ensemble cast, Mr. Holland's Opus plucks the heartstrings without shame -- and with undeniable skill." CinemaScore reported that audiences gave the film a rare "A+" grade. The New York Times film review cited Dreyfuss for "a warm and really touching performance"; Variety also called his performance "quite effective and surprisingly restrained". Variety further noted the "nostalgic aura" that permeates the film, "which encourages viewers to think fondly of — and pay tribute to — the one teacher in their lives who made a difference". Roger Ebert gave the film 3 1/2 out of 4 stars, commending its starring and supporting casts and agreeing with the film's message of the ability of high school teachers to inspire their students, as well as the importance of cultural offerings on the curriculum.

Writer Patrick Sheane Duncan was nominated for the Golden Globe Award for Best Screenplay at the 53rd Golden Globe Awards. Dreyfuss was nominated for the Academy Award for Best Actor and the Golden Globe Award for Best Actor – Motion Picture Drama.

=== Mr. Holland's Opus Foundation ===
Inspired by the motion picture, its composer, Michael Kamen, founded the Mr. Holland's Opus Foundation in 1996 as his commitment to the future of music education.

== Musical version ==
A world premiere musical version adapted from Duncan's screenplay was staged from August 12 to September 17, 2022, at the Ogunquit Playhouse in Ogunquit, Maine. Book, lyrics and direction are by Tony Award winner BD Wong with music by Wayne Barker.

== See also ==
- List of films featuring the deaf and hard of hearing
- "Mr. Lisa's Opus", a 2017 episode of the twenty-ninth season of The Simpsons which spoofs Mr. Holland's Opus.
