= Jane Kaczmarek =

American actress (born 1955)

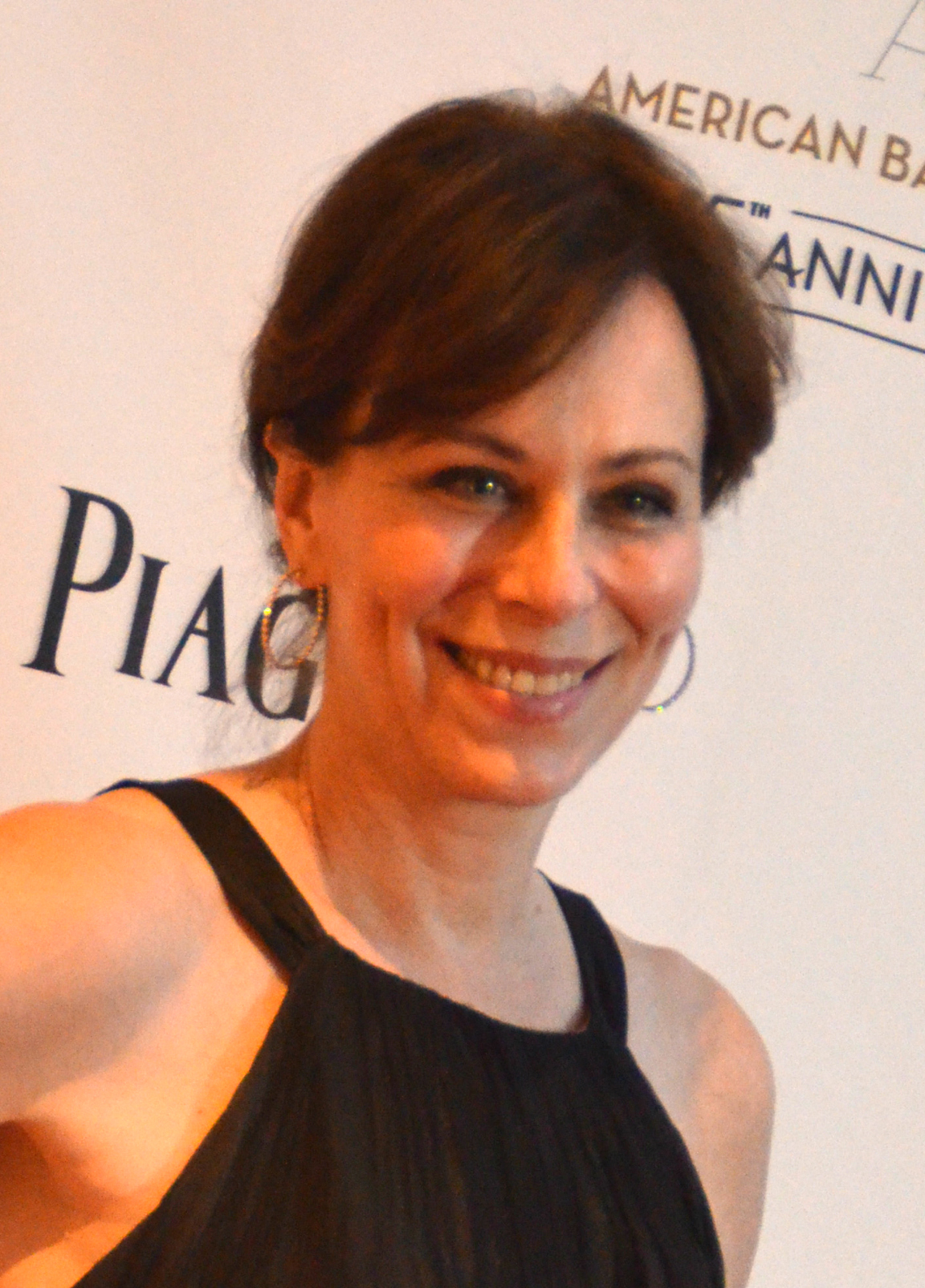
- Kaczmarek in 2014
- Born: Jane Frances Kaczmarek; December 21, 1955 (age 70); Milwaukee, Wisconsin, U.S.
- Education: University of Wisconsin, Madison (BA); Yale University (MFA)
- Occupation: Actress
- Years active: 1983–present
- Spouses: Bradley Whitford (m. 1992; div. 2010) Rusty Long (m. 2025)
- Children: 3

Jane Frances Kaczmarek (/kæzˈmærək/; born December 21, 1955) is an American actress. Her role as Lois on the Fox sitcom Malcolm in the Middle (2000–2006) earned her three Golden Globe nominations and seven Primetime Emmy nominations. She also appeared as Linda Bauer in Equal Justice (1990–1991), Judge Trudy Kessler in Raising the Bar (2008–2009), Ann in Falling in Love (1984), Emily in The Heavenly Kid (1985), and Gayle in 6 Balloons (2018). She had recurring roles as Holly in Cybill and as Maureen Cutler in Frasier. Kaczmarek was a replacement for the character of Bella in the Broadway production of Neil Simon's Lost In Yonkers.

== Early life and education ==
Kaczmarek was born in Milwaukee, Wisconsin, the daughter of Evelyn (née Gregorska), a teacher, and Edward Kaczmarek, a US Department of Defense worker. Of Polish descent, she grew up in Greendale, a village outside Milwaukee, where she was raised a Roman Catholic. Kaczmarek is a graduate of Greendale High School. She graduated from the University of Wisconsin-Madison in 1979 and Yale School of Drama in 1982.

== Career ==
Kaczmarek appeared in St. Elsewhere, and sitcoms Frasier and Cybill. She was also a regular on the first eight episodes of the Showtime run of The Paper Chase, as Connie Lehman. She also played a major role in the 1994 television film Without Warning as Dr. Caroline Jaffe.

In 1999, Kaczmarek was cast to play Lois in the sitcom Malcolm in the Middle, which premiered on January 9, 2000. TV Guide dubbed her role in the series as a "true breakout; a female Homer Simpson", and critics hailed her for her comic talents. Later, Kaczmarek would credit the show for bringing out her comedic side, saying, "[Before Malcolm] I couldn't even get auditions for comedies. I played very unfunny people."

In September 2008, she appeared on stage in The House of Blue Leaves at the Mark Taper Forum in Los Angeles.

In 2011, it was confirmed that Kaczmarek would make a vocal appearance as Red Jessica in the television series Jake and the Never Land Pirates during its second season early 2012.

Kaczmarek was the narrator in the 2011 Wisconsin Educational Communications Board and PBS production of Wisconsin's Nazi Resistance: The Mildred Fish-Harnack Story, a documentary about the life of fellow Milwaukee native Mildred Fish-Harnack who, in 1943, was the only American woman to ever be personally sentenced to death by order of Adolf Hitler for her role in the German Nazi Resistance Movement.

In November 2012, she made a guest appearance on ABC's The Middle as Frankie Heck's (Patricia Heaton) dental teacher. In 2013, Kaczmarek guest starred on NBC's long-running legal drama, Law & Order: Special Victims Unit, as Suffolk County D.A. Pamela "Pam" James.

Kaczmarek and former Malcolm in the Middle co-star Bryan Cranston reprised their roles as Lois and Hal respectively in an "alternate ending" featurette on the Breaking Bad DVD/Blu-ray box set that was released on November 26, 2013. In it, Hal wakes up from the nightmare that was the plot of Breaking Bad, in a nod to the final scene from Newhart.

== Personal life ==
Kaczmarek married fellow Wisconsin native and actor Bradley Whitford on August 15, 1992. They resided in Pasadena, California with their three children. Inspired by their own frequent red carpet appearances, in 2002 the couple founded the charity "Clothes off our Back", which auctioned outfits and accessories worn by celebrities at award ceremonies. They were sometimes referred to as a celebrity "power couple".

Kaczmarek underwent a hip replacement in April 2004, due to chronic arthritis. She used an X-ray of her new hip for her Emmy campaign the following summer, advertising herself as "the only Emmy nominee with an artificial hip (except for Anthony LaPaglia)".

In June 2009, the couple filed for divorce after almost 17 years of marriage. The divorce was finalized in October 2010 and they sold their 1924 villa in San Marino, California.

In March 2026, Kaczmarek told People magazine that she had married her high school sweetheart, Rusty Long, in July 2025. The two had dated as teenagers in the early 1970s but their relationship ended after graduation. They reconnected after seeing each other again at their high school class reunion in 2024.

== Filmography ==
=== Film ===
| Year | Title | Role |
|---|---|---|
| 1983 | Uncommon Valor | Mrs. Wilkes |
| 1984 | Falling in Love | Ann Raftis |
| 1985 | The Heavenly Kid | Emily Barnes |
| 1985 | Door to Door | Katherine Holloway |
| 1988 | D.O.A. | Gail Cornell |
| 1988 | Vice Versa | Robyn Seymour |
| 1989 | All's Fair | Linda |
| 1996 | The Chamber | Dr. Anne Biddows |
| 1996 | Wildly Available | Rita Goodman |
| 1998 | Pleasantville | David and Jennifer's mom |
| 2010 | Reviving Ophelia | Marie |
| 2015 | The Boat Builder | Katherine |
| 2016 | Wolves at the Door | Mary |
| 2017 | CHiPs | Jane Lindel |
| 2018 | 6 Balloons | Gayle |

=== Television ===
| Year | Title | Role | Notes |
|---|---|---|---|
| 1983 | St. Elsewhere | Sandy Burns | 3 episodes |
| 1983 | Remington Steele | Barbara Troy Dannon | Episode: "Altared Steele" |
| 1983 | Scarecrow and Mrs. King | Penny | Episode: "Always Look a Gift Horse in the Mouth" |
| 1983–84 | The Paper Chase | Connie Lehman | 8 episodes |
| 1984 | Hill Street Blues | Officer Clara Pilksy | 6 episodes |
| 1984 | Something About Amelia | Mrs. Hall | Television movie |
| 1984 | Crazy Like a Fox | Julie Floyd | Pilot episode |
| 1985 | Hometown | Mary Newell Abbott | 10 episodes |
| 1986 | The Right of the People | Alicia | Television movie |
| 1986 | The Christmas Gift | Susan | Television movie |
| 1987 | I'll Take Manhattan | Nina Stern | Television movie |
| 1987 | The Three Kings | Dr. Paula Bolet | Television movie |
| 1988 | American Playhouse | Susan Glaspell | Episode: "Journey Into Genius" |
| 1989 | Spooner | Gail Archer | Television movie |
| 1990–91 | Equal Justice | Linda Bauer | 22 episodes |
| 1993 | Big Wave Dave's | Karen Fisher | 6 episodes |
| 1994 | Monty | Nickerson | Episode: "Wild, Wild Willy and His O.K. Corral" |
| 1994 | Law & Order | Janet Rudman | Episode: "Censure" |
| 1994 | ABC Afterschool Specials | Mary Reed | Episode: "Boys Will Be Boys" |
| 1994 | L.A. Law | Karen Gershon-woo | Episode: "Whose San Andreas Fault Is It, Anyways?" |
| 1994 | Without Warning | Dr. Caroline Jaffe | Television movie |
| 1995 | Picket Fences | Janice Neiman | Episode: "Heroes and Villains" |
| 1995–99 | Party of Five | Helene Thompson | 3 episodes |
| 1996 | Touched by an Angel | Bonnie Bell | Episode: "Out of the Darkness" |
| 1996 | ABC Afterschool Specials | Nancy Gallagher | Episode: "Educating Mom" |
| 1996 | Apollo 11 | Jan Armstrong | Television movie |
| 1996–97 | Cybill | Holly | 5 episodes |
| 1996–97 | Frasier | Maureen Cutler | 2 episodes |
| 1997 | The Practice | Pamela Boyd | 2 episodes |
| 1999 | Felicity | Carol Anderson | 5 episodes |
| 2000–06 | Malcolm in the Middle | Lois | 151 episodes American Comedy Award for Funniest Female Performer in a Television Series; Satellite Award for Best Actress – Television Series Musical or Comedy; Television Critics Association Award for Individual Achievement in Comedy (2000–01); Nominated—Golden Globe Award for Best Actress – Television Series Musical or Comedy (2001–03); Nominated—Primetime Emmy Award for Outstanding Lead Actress in a Comedy Series (2000–06); Nominated—Satellite Award for Best Actress – Television Series Musical or Comedy; Nominated—Screen Actors Guild Award for Outstanding Performance by a Female Actor in a Comedy Series (2001, 2003); Nominated—Teen Choice Award for Choice TV Actress – Comedy; Nominated—Viewers for Quality Television Award for Best Actress in a Quality Comedy Series |
| 2001–present | The Simpsons | Judge Constance Harm (voice) | 10 episodes |
| 2001 | The Wheels on the Bus | Narrator | US dub |
| 2006–07 | Help Me Help You | Anne Hoffman | 6 episodes |
| 2008–09 | Raising the Bar | Judge Trudy Kessler | 23 episodes |
| 2010 | Reviving Ophelia | Marie Jones | Television movie |
| 2011 | Wilfred | Beth | Episode: "Pride" |
| 2011–12 | Whitney | Candi | 3 episodes |
| 2012–13 | The Middle | Sandy Armwood | 2 episodes |
| 2012–15 | Jake and the Never Land Pirates | Red Jessica (voice) | 12 episodes |
| 2013 | Law & Order: Special Victims Unit | D.A. Pam James | Episode: "Beautiful Frame" |
| 2014 | Phineas and Ferb | Denise (voice) | Episode: "Lost in Danville/The Inator Method" |
| 2014 | Us & Them | Pam | 7 episodes |
| 2014–17 | Playing House | Gwen Crawford | 7 episodes |
| 2015 | The McCarthys | Eileen | Episode: "Sister Act" |
| 2015 | Big Time in Hollywood, FL | Dr. Moore | 2 episodes |
| 2015 | Penn Zero: Part-Time Hero | Coach Jackie (voice) | Episode: "Ultrahyperball" |
| 2016 | The Big Bang Theory | Dr. Gallo | Episode: "The Sales Call Sublimation" |
| 2016 | Cooper Barrett's Guide to Surviving Life | Cindy Barrett | Episode: "How to Survive Your Parents' Visit" |
| 2018 | Animals. | Judge (voice) | Episode: "The Trial" |
| 2018 | This Is Us | Mrs. Philips | Episode: "Katie Girls" |
| 2019 | Trolls: The Beat Goes On! | Mom Cloud (voice) | Episode: "Don't Worry Be Peppy/Two's a Cloud" |
| 2019 | Carol's Second Act | Phyllis | Episode: "Sick and Retired" |
| 2019 | Mixed-ish | Eleanor | Episode: "True Colors" |
| 2023 | The Changeling | Callisto "Cal" | Episode: "The Wise Ones" |
| 2026 | Malcolm in the Middle: Life's Still Unfair | Lois | 4 episodes |
| 2026 | The Boroughs | Lilly Cooper | 4 episodes |

=== Stage ===
| Year | Title | Role | Notes | Ref. |
|---|---|---|---|---|
| 1988 | The Legend of Oedipus | Antigone | Williamstown Theater Festival | |
| 1991 | Lost in Yonkers | Bella (Replacement) | Richard Rodgers Theatre, Broadway | |
| 1994 | Kindertransport | Helga | Manhattan Theatre Club, Off-Broadway | |
| 1995 | Raised in Captivity | Hillary MacMahon/Miranda Bliss | South Coast Repertory Theatre | |
| 1998 | Loose Ends | Susan | McGinn-Cazale Theater, Off-Broadway | |
| 2008 | The House of Blue Leaves | Bunny | Mark Taper Forum, Los Angeles | |
| 2010 | The Autumn Garden | Nina Denery | Antaeus Theatre Company | |
| 2011 | Death of a Salesman | Linda Loman | LA Theatre Works | |
| 2012 | Good People | Margie Walsh | Geffen Playhouse | |
| 2013 | Kindertransport | Helga | LA Theatre Works | |
| 2016 | And No More Shall We Part | Pam | Williamstown Theater Festival | |
| 2017 | Long Day's Journey Into Night | Mary Tyrone | Geffen Playhouse | |
| 2017 | The Roommate | Robyn | Williamstown Theater Festival | |
| 2017 | Our Town | Stage Manager | Pasadena Playhouse | |
| 2018 | The Year is Yet to Come | Estelle | La Jolla Playhouse | |
| 2019 | Tell Me I'm Not Crazy | Diana | Williamstown Theater Festival | |
| 2022 | The Folks at Home | Maureen Littlefield | Baltimore Center Stage | |

== Awards and nominations ==
| Year | Award | Category | Work | Result |
|---|---|---|---|---|
| 2000 | Primetime Emmy Awards | Outstanding Lead Actress in a Comedy Series | Malcolm in the Middle | Nominated |
| 2000 | TCA Awards | Individual Achievement in Comedy | Malcolm in the Middle | Won |
| 2001 | Primetime Emmy Awards | Outstanding Lead Actress in a Comedy Series | Malcolm in the Middle | Nominated |
| 2001 | Golden Globe Awards | Best Actress in a Television Series: Musical or Comedy | Malcolm in the Middle | Nominated |
| 2001 | Screen Actors Guild Awards | Outstanding Performance by a Female Actor in a Comedy Series | Malcolm in the Middle | Nominated |
| 2001 | TCA Awards | Individual Achievement in Comedy | Malcolm in the Middle | Won |
| 2002 | Primetime Emmy Awards | Outstanding Lead Actress in a Comedy Series | Malcolm in the Middle | Nominated |
| 2002 | Golden Globe Awards | Best Actress in a Television Series: Musical or Comedy | Malcolm in the Middle | Nominated |
| 2002 | Satellite Awards | Best Actress in a Television Series: Musical or Comedy | Malcolm in the Middle | Nominated |
| 2003 | Primetime Emmy Awards | Outstanding Lead Actress in a Comedy Series | Malcolm in the Middle | Nominated |
| 2003 | Golden Globe Awards | Best Actress in a Television Series: Musical or Comedy | Malcolm in the Middle | Nominated |
| 2003 | Screen Actors Guild Awards | Outstanding Performance by a Female Actor in a Comedy Series | Malcolm in the Middle | Nominated |
| 2004 | Primetime Emmy Awards | Outstanding Lead Actress in a Comedy Series | Malcolm in the Middle | Nominated |
| 2004 | Satellite Awards | Best Actress in a Television Series: Musical or Comedy | Malcolm in the Middle | Won |
| 2005 | Primetime Emmy Awards | Outstanding Lead Actress in a Comedy Series | Malcolm in the Middle | Nominated |
| 2006 | Primetime Emmy Awards | Outstanding Lead Actress in a Comedy Series | Malcolm in the Middle | Nominated |
| 2012 | Ovation Awards | Lead Actress in a Play | Good People | Nominated |
