= Wildly Available =

- Directed by: Michael Nolin
- Written by: Michael Nolin
- Starring: Kristoffer Tabori; Jennifer Sommerfield; Jane Kaczmarek
- Release date: 1996
- Country: United States
- Language: English

Wildly Available is 1996 erotic thriller film written and directed by Michael Nolin.

The film premiered at the Hollywood Film Festival.

== Plot ==
A man experiments with kinky sex to court a dominatrix, while his wife vents to a psychiatrist.

== Crtical reception ==
Variety wrote "Neither outrageous enough to spark word of mouth nor cerebral enough to entice serious cinephiles, low-budgeter might lure a certain following to smaller arthouse venues, but stands a better chance of breaking out as a video sleeper for curious stay-at-homes."
