= 84C MoPic =

1989 film by Patrick Sheane Duncan

- Directed by: Patrick Sheane Duncan
- Written by: Patrick Sheane Duncan
- Produced by: Michael Nolin
- Edited by: Stephen Purvis
- Music by: Donovan
- Distributed by: New Century Vista Film Company
- Release date: April 7, 1989
- Running time: 95 minutes
- Country: United States
- Languages: English; Vietnamese
- Box office: $154,264 (US)

84C MoPic (also known as 84 Charlie MoPic) is a 1989 American independent found footage war drama film written and directed by Patrick Sheane Duncan. It is set during the Vietnam War as a pseudo-documentary of a supposedly routine Long Range Reconnaissance Patrol (LRRP) mission that goes wrong and eventually turns into a struggle for survival.

== Plot ==
The film's point of view is from an inexperienced cameraman following a Long Range Reconnaissance Patrol team from the U.S. Army's 173rd Airborne Brigade on a five-day patrol deep into "Indian Country" (territory controlled by the North Vietnamese) in the Central Highlands in 1969. The cameraman is nicknamed MoPic by the team, because of his alphanumeric military occupational specialty, 84C20, Motion Picture Specialist. He is accompanied by an also inexperienced public relations career officer, LT.

At first, the team seems in control. Their leader, Sergeant OD, detects booby traps, and the team lays some booby traps of their own. They evade detection by an NVA patrol, and move deep behind enemy lines. One night, over the radio, they hear an entire American company being overrun by the NVA. They find an NVA unit in the open and call in an artillery strike on it.

Now that the NVA knows there are Americans nearby, they avoid any gunfire and make their escape in the bush as silently as possible. OD catches a small NVA patrol on their tail, and the team takes them out and carry off a wounded NVA soldier with them as demanded by LT. Their position is exposed by the noise, and a sniper takes out team member Pretty Boy. The sniper repeatedly shoots him in the limbs in an attempt to lure other team members out into the open. Unable to rescue Pretty Boy, OD mercy kills him. OD then demands LT kill the NVA prisoner with a knife to avoid any more noise. He sadistically makes LT look at pictures of the NVA soldier's family before LT kills the prisoner.

The team continues their escape, but encounter VC troops that wound OD and kill Cracker. With OD barely able to walk, Hammer, a less experienced team member, takes point. Hammer triggers a booby trap almost immediately, killing him. With half the team killed, the survivors make their way to their evacuation point, a small village strewn with civilian bodies. During a final firefight, MoPic is shot and killed while OD, LT, and Easy escape in a helicopter along with the camera.

== Cast ==
- Jonathan Emerson as Lieutenant 'LT' Drewery
- Richard Brooks as Sergeant 'OD' O'Donigan
- Jason Tomlins as Specialist 'Pretty Boy' Baldwin
- Christopher Burgard as Specialist 'Hammer' Thorpe
- Nicholas Cascone as Private 'Easy' Easley
- Glenn Morshower as 'Cracker'
- Byron Thames as 'MoPic'

== Production and reception ==
84C MoPic was filmed on a low budget in Southern California. The film is one of the earlier examples of found footage, a style famously implemented by The Blair Witch Project and Paranormal Activity. As of 2025, 84 Charlie MoPic has an 83% "Fresh" rating on Rotten Tomatoes, based on 6 reviews. Roger Ebert, awarding the film three stars out of four, wrote:

"84 Charlie MoPic deserves a place by itself among the films about Vietnam. It is a brave and original attempt to record nothing more or less than the actual daily experience of a unit on patrol, drawn out of the memories of men who were there. I’ve never seen a combat movie that seemed this close to actual experience, to the kinds of hard lessons that soldiers are taught by their enemies. The filmmakers have earned their right to shoot with a subjective camera — because the eyes we are really seeing through are their own."

The film received three nominations:

- 1989 Sundance Film Festival, Grand Jury Prize, Dramatic (Patrick Sheane Duncan)
- 1990 Independent Spirit Award, Best First Feature, Patrick Sheane Duncan (Director); Michael Nolin (Producer)
- 1990 Independent Spirit Award, Best Screenplay, Patrick Sheane Duncan

The film is listed among recommended Vietnam war films in a blog post on the Council on Foreign Relations.
