= Dracula vs. Hitler =

2016 novel by Patrick Sheane Duncan

- First edition cover
- Author: Patrick Sheane Duncan
- Language: English
- Genre: Historical fiction; Horror fiction
- Publisher: Inkshares
- Publication date: October 25, 2016
- Publication place: United States
- Media type: Print (hardcover); eBook; Audiobook
- Pages: 500
- ISBN: 978-1942645085

Dracula vs. Hitler is a 2016 historical horror novel by American screenwriter Patrick Sheane Duncan. It is a continuation of the story told in the 1897 horror novel Dracula by Bram Stoker.

== Plot ==
Soon after the events of Dracula, Dr. Abraham Van Helsing retrieves the corpse of the impaled vampire Count Dracula from a river. Dracula soon revives and slaughters most of the men helping Van Helsing transport him, but Van Helsing manages to kill the vampire again with a wagon wheel spoke. He buries Dracula in a local cemetery.

In 1941, Van Helsing is living in Brașov, a Nazi-occupied city in Transylvania, Romania, with his adult daughter, the fiery Lucille. The Van Helsings are part of a resistance cell working against the Nazis. Their new contact from the British Special Operations Executive is Jonathan Murray Harker, the grandson of Jonathan Harker and Mina Murray, who had aided Van Helsing in the original defeat of Dracula. Led by Major Reikel, the Nazis have committed countless atrocities against the locals, and are using Dracula's castle as a prison. Van Helsing reasons that the only way to defeat a monster like Reikel is with another monster: Dracula. Van Helsing takes Jonathan to the imposing crypt where he had imprisoned the vampire years before, his coffin secured with iron straps. After a night of preparations, they reawaken Dracula after daybreak by pulling out the spoke and pouring some of Jonathan's blood into the wound and the vampire's mouth. Dracula is held at bay by crisscrossing beams of sunlight reflected off mirror shards placed around the crypt. Van Helsing makes Dracula an offer: his freedom in exchange for Dracula's help in defeating the Nazis who are ravaging his homeland, and the promise of drinking as much Nazi blood as he wants. Dracula agrees, and begins helping the resistance sabotage vital Nazi infrastructure. He proves to be a brutal and powerful killer, but is soon conflicted by his complete lack of control when in the throes of his bloodlust. A connection develops between Dracula and Lucille, much to the chagrin of a lovesick Harker.

Harker's explosives expert, a Scottish soldier with a head injury whom Harker has dubbed "Renfield", proves the aptness of his nickname when he becomes immediately obsessed with Dracula and calls him "master". He is captured by the Nazis, and names resistance members under torture. Though Harker, Van Helsing and Lucille evade capture, Reikel manages to seize Dracula. With a knowledge of vampire lore, Reikel is able to keep Dracula imprisoned while testing his superhuman abilities. Adolf Hitler himself comes to see the vampire. With the help of gypsies they previously saved from the Nazis, Harker and the Van Helsings come to Dracula's rescue, just as the vampire finally breaks free and wreaks havoc in the castle. Renfield sacrifices himself for Dracula. Hitler barely escapes with Reikel, who has been bitten by the vampire.

== Reception ==
Glenn Dallas of Seattle Book Review praised the novel's "solid characterization and engaging storytelling" and wrote, "Dracula vs. Hitler sounds like a B-movie, but Patrick Sheane Duncan takes the idea and treats it with respect ... This feels like a proper historical fiction novel with a curious dash of the supernatural woven in, weaving in Bram Stoker's classic tale and putting a unique spin on the story all at once." Trisha Chambers of Dread Central called Dracula vs. Hitler "an amazing tale of action and adventure". Publishers Weekly praised the novel's "cinematic fight scenes and lush descriptions", but concluded that "the massive lump of backstory proves indigestible." Sheila M. Merritt of Diabolique Magazine described Dracula vs. Hitler as "smart and engrossing", praising the story and romantic tension and noting that "Dracula as anti-hero is admirably executed". Angie Barry of Criminal Element called the novel "a thrilling action adventure" and wrote, "Duncan does a masterful job of paying homage to his source material ... and [Dracula] gets to have a really satisfying redemption arc."
