= HK-47 =

Fictional robot assassin in the Star Wars universe

- Star Wars character
- Render of HK-47 from Star Wars: Knights of the Old Republic (2003)
- First appearance: Star Wars: Knights of the Old Republic (2003)
- Created by: David Gaider
- Voiced by: Kristoffer Tabori

In-universe information
- Species: Droid

HK-47 is a character in the Star Wars franchise. He first appeared as a companion character in BioWare's 2003 role-playing video game Star Wars: Knights of the Old Republic, in which he is revealed to have been constructed by the player character's former identity, Revan. Written by David Gaider, visually designed by John Gallagher and voiced by Kristoffer Tabori, HK-47 is characterized by his formal manner of speech, enthusiasm for violence and habitual description of organic beings as "meatbags".

HK-47 later appeared in Star Wars Knights of the Old Republic II: The Sith Lords, the Trials of Obi-Wan expansion for Star Wars Galaxies, Star Wars: The Old Republic, and other works in the former Star Wars Expanded Universe, now designated Star Wars Legends. A substantial portion of his intended storyline in The Sith Lords, involving a factory producing HK-50 assassin droids, was cut from the original release and later reconstructed in The Sith Lords Restored Content Modification.

The character received the Original Game Character of the Year award at the 2004 Game Developers Choice Awards. Critics have particularly praised the contrast between his courteous delivery and homicidal personality, his function as a counterpoint to a light-sided player character, and Tabori's comic performance. HK-47 has subsequently been recognized as one of BioWare's most memorable companion characters.

== Concept and development ==
=== Creation and design ===
HK-47 was written by BioWare designer David Gaider. The character's name originated with a billiards team formed by Knights of the Old Republic senior writer Drew Karpyshyn. Four of the team members were named Harrison, while Karpyshyn supplied the letter K; the group called itself the "HK-47s" because the name resembled that of the AK-47. After Karpyshyn's teammates learned that he was working on a Star Wars game, they encouraged him to include a robot bearing the name.

Concept-art director John Gallagher said lead designer James Ohlen gave him the brief of creating a "badass C-3PO". Gallagher retained the bilaterally symmetrical shape associated with a protocol droid but broadened and flattened the head using a copperhead snake as a visual reference. He believed that the design needed to communicate HK-47's hostile disposition even before the character spoke. The character's connection with Revan also parallels that between C-3PO and Anakin Skywalker, as both droids are eventually revealed to have been constructed by a figure who later became a major Sith Lord.

=== Voice and characterization ===
HK-47 was voiced by actor and director Kristoffer Tabori. HK-47 usually prefaces his dialogue with functional labels such as "Statement", "Query" and "Observation". His controlled, protocol-droid speech contrasts with his enthusiasm for assassination and contempt for organic life.

During recording, the character was initially intended to sound serious, evil and threatening. Voice director Darragh O'Farrell and Tabori concluded early in the session that the sinister approach was ineffective, and instead developed a more tongue-in-cheek performance that emphasized the contrast between the droid's restrained delivery and violent dialogue. BioWare initially objected to the comic interpretation because it departed from the character description supplied to the recording team. O'Farrell continued with the revised performance because of the production schedule, intending to reconsider it once the other recording sessions were complete. By that stage, the developers had come to prefer Tabori's version and retained it in the finished game.

== Appearances ==
=== In Knights of the Old Republic ===
In Star Wars: Knights of the Old Republic, the player encounters HK-47 for sale in a droid shop on Tatooine. The droid is initially required to translate the language of a nearby group of Tusken Raiders, and may thereafter remain as a member of the player's party.

Repairing HK-47 gradually restores portions of his erased memory. He is eventually revealed to have been constructed by Revan as a protocol and assassination droid and subsequently passed between several owners after Revan's disappearance. HK-47 explains that he first used "meatbag" to insult Revan's apprentice Darth Malak. Revan was amused by Malak's reaction and programmed HK-47 to apply the term to organic beings generally.

The character's behaviour can complement a player following the dark side or provide a comic and moral contrast to a light-sided Revan. Although he frequently recommends violent solutions, his loyalty remains directed toward whoever he recognizes as his current master.

=== In The Sith Lords ===
HK-47 returns in Star Wars Knights of the Old Republic II: The Sith Lords. He is initially found deactivated aboard the Ebon Hawk and must be repaired using components recovered from the HK-50 droids that repeatedly attack the player character. Once restored, he provides further information about Revan, his former owners and the principles by which he distinguishes assassination from indiscriminate killing.

A factory producing the HK-50 units was intended to conclude HK-47's storyline. In the planned sequence, the player would control HK-47 as he infiltrated the facility and confronted the mass-produced droids, which he regarded as inferior imitations of himself. The area and much of its recorded dialogue were cut from the commercial release because of the game's shortened development schedule. The factory was later reconstructed from unused assets and dialogue for The Sith Lords Restored Content Modification.

=== Other appearances ===
HK-47 appears in Trials of Obi-Wan, an expansion for the massively multiplayer online role-playing game Star Wars Galaxies. Set thousands of years after the character's original appearances, the storyline depicts his artificial intelligence surviving within a computer aboard a crashed Republic vessel on Mustafar, where players assist him in obtaining a new droid body.

He later appears as an enemy in flashpoints and an operation in the MMORPG Star Wars: The Old Republic. HK-47 is also an unlockable character in the mobile role-playing game Star Wars: Galaxy of Heroes.

== Reception ==
HK-47 won the Original Game Character of the Year category at the 2004 Game Developers Choice Awards. GameSpot included him among its coolest new characters of 2003, describing him as one of the most original additions to Star Wars in several years. GamesRadar+ later ranked him third in a feature on well-conceived video-game characters, calling him "cheerfully insane" and the highlight of the Knights of the Old Republic series.

Much of the character's critical reception has focused on his humorous dialogue, and his relationship to the player's morality. Kane described Tabori's performance as one of the production's more contentious creative decisions, although later critics identified HK-47's humour and aggressive disposition as the principal reasons for the character's popularity. Critics have interpreted this contrast both as comic relief and as a counterpoint to the player's moral choices, particularly when the player follows the light side of the Force.

In a retrospective assessment of BioWare companions, Evan Lahti of PC Gamer selected HK-47 as his personal favourite, finding the character's deliberately simple and murderous personality entertaining when contrasted with the developer's more emotionally rounded companions. The magazine later included HK-47 in a selection of notable role-playing game party members. Kimberley Wallace of Game Informer included HK-47 among BioWare's best characters, arguing that none of the developer's other comic-relief figures matched his combination of apparent wisdom and mean-spiritedness. Matt Miller, writing for the same publication, ranked him second among the decade's artificial-intelligence characters and said that he provided an effective counterpoint to the heroic behaviour of a light-sided player. A separate Game Informer feature argued that HK-47 reflected Revan's history on both sides of the Force and reinforced the broader Star Wars theme that individuals are capable of both good and evil.

GamesRadar+ included HK-47 among the best characters introduced during the 2000s and praised both his characterization and memorability. Empire ranked him 43rd among its greatest video-game characters and described him as "brilliantly twisted". IGN placed him 13th in its ranking of Star Wars heroes.

== Legacy ==
Kane identified HK-47, alongside Revan, as one of the Knights of the Old Republic characters whose popularity endured well beyond the original game's release. Gallagher similarly noted that fan artwork, custom models and continuing recognition had allowed the character to persist among later generations of players. Kane also argued that HK-47's influence could be detected in the hostile and darkly comic droids introduced in later Star Wars works.

GamesRadar+ cited HK-47 as an early example of a recurring BioWare companion archetype: a capable robot whose blunt or socially detached behaviour supplies humour while also commenting on the player's decisions. Later BioWare games featured comparable robotic or synthetic companions, although the publication considered HK-47 the defining example of the type.

The restoration of HK-47's factory sequence became one of the most prominent features of The Sith Lords Restored Content Modification. Reporting on the project, PC Gamer described the restored area as a substantial character-driven section in which the player controls HK-47 and resolves the conflict with the HK-50 units. HK-47 was also released as a miniature in Wizards of the Coast's Champions of the Force line.

== Bibliography ==
- Kane, Alex (2019). Star Wars: Knights of the Old Republic. Boss Fight Books. ISBN 978-1-940535-21-0.
