= An American Symphony =

1995 symphony by Michael Kamen

An American Symphony ("Mr. Holland's Opus") is the symphonic piece played at the end of the 1995 film Mr. Holland's Opus. It was written by American composer Michael Kamen, and it won the 1997 Grammy for Best Instrumental Arrangement.

The lead character, Mr. Holland, can be seen working on the piece (at the piano and on scraps of sheet music) throughout the film. At the end of the film, the music comes to represent Holland's "opus" – as the many generations of students that he influenced come together to play his symphony for him – during the film's resolution.

== Music ==
The score was recorded by the London Metropolitan Orchestra for the film and issued in an 8 1/2 minute version on the original motion picture soundtrack. It was the second work on Kamen's 2001 album The New Moon in the Old Moon's Arms (a symphonic poem), played in an 18-minute version by the BBC Symphony Orchestra, Simon Mulligan (piano), Leila Josefowicz (violin), Michael Kamen (English horn), Pino Palladino (bass guitar), Phil Palmer (guitar), Andrew Charles Newmark (drums), conducted by Leonard Slatkin.

The 18-minute version consists of five movements:

1. Iris
2. Cole's Tune
3. Marking Homework
4. Rowena
5. Finale

=== Instrumentation ===
The score calls for an orchestra consisting of the following instruments:

Woodwinds

2 flutes (second doubling piccolo)
1 oboe
1 cor anglais
2 clarinets in B♭
1 bass clarinet
2 bassoons
1 contrabassoon

Brass

6 horns in F
3 trumpets in B♭
4 trombones
1 tuba

Percussion

Timpani
drum kit
suspended cymbal
bass drum
cymbals
tam-tam
glockenspiel
wind chimes

Keyboards

1 piano

Guitars

1 electric guitar
1 bass guitar

Strings

1 harp
violins I, II
violas
cellos
double basses

== Analysis ==
The arrangement is unusual in that it features many instrumental voicings that are not typical of traditional classical music, but rather, are more typical of contemporary American rock. For example, the song includes a full rock drum kit, an electric bass guitar, and an electric guitar.

The composition also features several effects that are only made possible by contemporary instruments, such as the left-handed glissando ("slide") on the electric bass guitar, the distortion pedals used on the electric guitar, and the introductory drum fill that begins the song’s major movement.

Additionally, the piece features a driving rhythm throughout, and is rarely without percussion. All of these characteristics are hallmarks of American rock, and help to emphasize that the piece should be perceived as an American work – just as the title portrays.
