= Patrick Sheane Duncan =

American writer, film producer and director (born 1947)

- Born: January 15, 1947 (age 79); Texas
- Occupation: filmmaker
- Known for: 84C MoPic, Mr. Holland's Opus
- Military career
- Allegiance: United States
- Branch: United States Army
- Service years: 1965–1966
- Rank: Private First Class
- Unit: 173rd Airborne Brigade
- Conflicts: Vietnam War

Patrick Sheane Duncan (born 1947) is an American writer, film producer and director.

A graduate of Grand Valley State University in Allendale Charter Township, Michigan, Duncan's career has been influenced by his Vietnam War experiences, which inspired the television miniseries Vietnam War Story (1987) and its sequel Vietnam War Story: The Last Days (1989) and the films 84C MoPic (1989) and Courage Under Fire (1996). Additional writing credits include A Home of Our Own (1993), The Pornographer (1994), Nick of Time (1995), Mr. Holland's Opus (1995), and the television movies A Painted House (2003), Elvis (2005), and the Little Red Wagon (2012).

Duncan is a winner of the CableACE Award for Writing for a Dramatic Series for Vietnam War Story: The Last Days and a Christopher Award for Mr. Holland's Opus, which also garnered him a Golden Globe nomination. He was nominated for the Grand Jury Prize at the Sundance Film Festival for 84C MoPic and The Pornographer and the Independent Spirit Award for Best First Feature and Best Screenplay for 84C MoPic. He received the Vietnam Veterans of America Excellence in the Arts Award at the organization's 1989 National Convention in Chicago.

Duncan's play, Souls on Fire, was produced by Danny Glover's theatre company, Robey Theatre Company in Los Angeles.

In 2016, Duncan published the historical horror novel Dracula vs. Hitler.
