= Kreia =

Fictional character in Star Wars

Kreia Darth Traya
- Star Wars character
- Concept art of Kreia.
- First appearance: Star Wars Knights of the Old Republic II: The Sith Lords (2004)
- Created by: Chris Avellone
- Designed by: Brian Menze
- Voiced by: Sara Kestelman

In-universe information
- Alias: Darth Traya
- Title: Dark Lord of the Sith
- Affiliation: Sith Order
- Apprentices: Darth Nihilus; Darth Sion

Kreia is a character and party member in Obsidian Entertainment's video game Star Wars Knights of the Old Republic II: The Sith Lords. She is a blind Force-sensitive who forms a "bond" with the player character, the Jedi Exile, through the Force. Kreia sets herself up as the Exile's mentor, and rejects the divide between the light and dark-side of the Force, as well as the predestination that the Force entails. By the game's end, it is revealed that she is the Sith Lord Darth Traya and is planning on destroying the Force, and she becomes the final boss of The Sith Lords. Kreia makes no more appearances in Star Wars fiction, though a miniature by Wizards of the Coast was released in August 2008, and she appears as an obtainable character in Star Wars: Galaxy of Heroes.

Written by Chris Avellone, the character was created as a sounding board for the game's theme of the role of the Jedi and the nature of the Force, and was heavily influenced by Planescape: Torment's Ravel Puzzlewell. She served both to test the player and to act as a mouthpiece for any questions Avellone thought should be asked about the Star Wars universe. Sara Kestelman voiced the character, with Kreia's casting being considered the most important of all the characters. Her name references Princess Leia of the original Star Wars trilogy, while her character design draws on both Palpatine's hood and Obi-Wan Kenobi's robes.

She was positively received, and is often pointed to as the highlight of The Sith Lords. Praise went to the questions and dialogue she provided, as well as her voice acting. The character has appeared in numerous "top lists", often commending her as a Star Wars character. Attention was drawn to one moment where Kreia lectures about the dangers of reckless charity. Despite this, Avellone felt he failed in creating a "sympathetic" Sith Lord, though he has called her one of his favorite characters in the game.

== Conception and creation ==
The first draft of the game placed a figurehead similar to Kreia as the leader of matriarchs ruling the Handmaiden's world, which the player was sent to free. This draft was made before Obsidian had played the first game, and after they had played it the draft was discarded. However, some of Kreia's characteristics were salvaged, though little else was.

In the game proper, Kreia was written by Chris Avellone, who was also lead designer of The Sith Lords and created most of the party. Avellone was initially unsure about working on Star Wars but after beginning became more "excited" about it. Avellone decided to attempt to create a sympathetic Sith Lord. The character was highly influenced by Ravel Puzzlewell, a Planescape: Torment character which Avellone also wrote, and was intended to tell stories with her he had been unable to tell in Torment. Avellone felt it would be "cool" to be in a party with Ravel. Despite Ravel's influence, the Star Wars setting and its elements resulted in Kreia changing heavily.

A multi-page biography was created for narrative reference, art, and audio. When making characters, Avellone prefers to focus on their role in the story, their name, their visual signature (discussed with the concept artist), and in Kreia's case the character's ability to serve as his voice. Her name is inspired by Princess Leia of the original Star Wars films, and serves a similar role as ally, but Kreia has a darker past demonstrated by a harsher prefix. Her visuals, meanwhile, combine elements of "the wise mentor" like Obi-Wan's robes with dark-side elements like Palpatine's hood. Brian Menze, lead concept artist and modeler for the characters, designed Kreia.

Narratively, Kreia had several roles in The Sith Lords, acting as a party member, a foil, and a "sounding board" for the theme of the game, which concerned the Jedi's role and the Force's nature in a living galaxy. As an extension of Avellone's voice, Kreia became his way of expressing all his problems with the Force. Despite her view of the Force, it was important to avoid causing continuity problems with the rest of the Star Wars series, and her views were presented within the context of the original Force in the Star Wars world. Kreia is intended to test the player on the basic philosophical issues of the Star Wars universe. She is rude and dismissive to everyone but the player character, something intended to help make the player feel special.

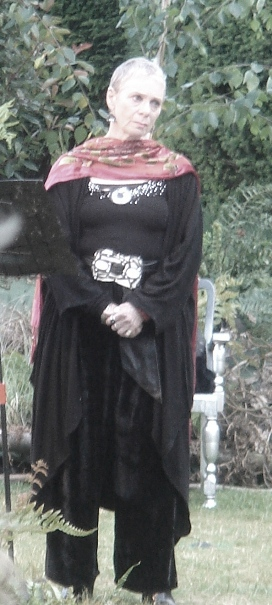
Sara Kestelman provided Kreia's voice.

English actress Sara Kestelman voiced the character in the game. In voice directors Will Beckman and Darragh O'Farrell's "Designer Diary", the character was considered the most critical character to cast, though a challenging one as few games cast women of her age group. Obsidian worked hard to find Kreia's voice, which had to match her model without being "witchy or grating" due to her extensive dialogue.

Developers tried to give each companion a unique ability to make them distinct from any other companion. Originally, throughout The Sith Lords Kreia would be seen through cutscenes recruiting certain characters such as Hanharr to side with her and seducing them to the dark-side, though her exact purpose was not made overt. At the end of the game, they would then be used as "cannon fodder" before the fight with her began. Ultimately, this was cut.

=== Character ===
Kreia is shown as an elderly blind woman, whose eyes have atrophied from lack of use in favor of viewing things through the Force, viewing normal sight as a distraction. Dialogue in The Sith Lords establishes her past as a Jedi historian and one of the teachers of Revan, who became a Sith Lord and was the player character of the first game, and how her teachings were blamed for his fall. The Sith Lords reveals she has trained two Sith antagonists of the game, Darth Sion and Darth Nihilus, before they cast her out. She is initially depicted in earth-brown hooded Jedi robes with empty white eyes, though after the revelation of her identity as Darth Traya, both a Sith and a being of betrayal, both her robes and eyes are changed to black, and her skin becomes paler.

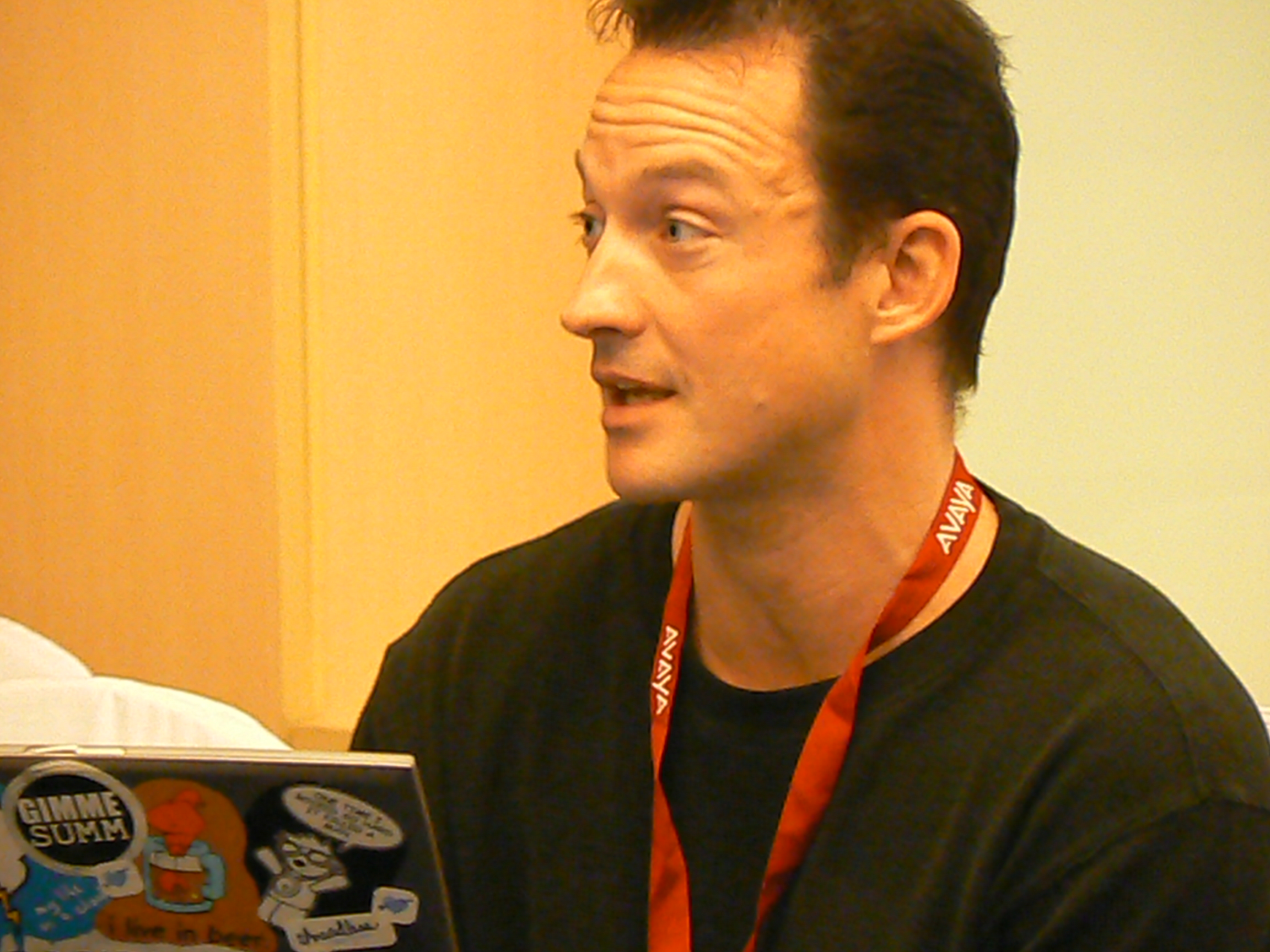
"She was questioning everything about the Star Wars universe that I thought should be questioned."—Chris Avellone, writer of the character

Kreia was the personification of Avellone's frustrations with the concept of the Force. He called her "one redeeming feature" her love of the player character, and what they represent: a way of destroying the Force and its predestination in favor of giving freedom to the galaxy. She shuns the light-side and the dark-side divide of the Force, as well as blanket good and evil, favoring choices that emphasise personal strength for the player. The A.V. Club's Julie Muncy described her philosophy as "a pessimistic and borderline-Randian way of thinking focused on the importance of power and strife".

She is initially presented as an ally and a teacher, and acts a mentor from the start of the game. Alexander Gambotto-Burke of Eurogamer commented that she has a "genuine, albeit twisted maternal" love for the player, her student. In contrast to Darth Malak, the clear villain of the first game, Avellone called Kreia neither "necessarily good or evil"; instead, she merely wants the Exile to grow as a person. Kreia is deliberately complicated in her goals and motivations, giving the character a feel of mystery. IGN's Hilary Goldstein noted this mystery, commenting on her seemingly dark motives and yet how she appears as the player's "staunchest defender and a true protector".

== Appearances ==
=== In The Sith Lords ===
The game was first released in December 2004, on Xbox, marking the character's debut. Kreia initially seems dead when introduced, but after the player character, an exile of the Jedi Order, enters the morgue of the mining station they've woken in, she begins conversation. She informs the player that while they both slept they formed a Force bond, tying the Exile and Kreia together. It is revealed that Kreia and the Exile both came in aboard the Ebon Hawk after the Exile's original ship was attacked by the Sith and the Exile rescued while unconscious. During their escape, Kreia encounters Darth Sion and loses her hand in the ensuing battle, which in turn causes the Exile tremendous pain due to their bond. After she rejoins the party and they escape the station on the Ebon Hawk, Kreia then appoints herself the Exile's "teacher".

Kreia serves as a party member throughout the game, and may interject at certain points of it to offer her perspective. Depending on each decision the player makes, Kreia may gain or lose "Influence", which measures how much "trust, confidence, or control" the player has with a party member. Unlike with other party members, Kreia's alignment is not affected by the player's Influence level with her and is instead set at neutral, though Influence will unlock new conversations with her. In gameplay, she may only equip one hand, and is a "Jedi Consular", focused on using the game's Force powers. Having her in the party grants the player extra experience, and any Force effects the player character or Kreia use on themselves will also affect the other.

After the player finds all the Jedi Masters in-hiding, Kreia will retake her mantle as a Sith Lord. If the player does not kill the Jedi, she will intervene when they attempt to cut the Exile off from the Force, draining the Jedi of the Force herself and killing them. If the player chooses to kill the Jedi, she will renounce the Exile. Either way, she will leave, and the player must hunt her to Malachor V, the site of such great atrocities and death that they caused a wound in the Force. Kreia seemingly plans to create another wound in the Force there, deafening all to the Force and causing its "death", as well as potentially killing all those touched by it. The player faces Kreia, now "Darth Traya", as the final boss, and after she is defeated, she offers to describe the future she foresees before dying.

=== Later appearances ===
The character has made no subsequent appearances in Star Wars fiction. However, Kreia is mentioned in several Star Wars reference books, such as Jedi vs. Sith: The Essential Guide to the Force and the second volume of The Complete Star Wars Encyclopedia. In addition, Wizards of the Coast created a miniature for the character, along with other characters in the Knights of the Old Republic series, which was released on August 19, 2008. In February 2018, Darth Traya and select other Sith Lords characters were announced as playable characters and raid bosses for the mobile game Star Wars: Galaxy of Heroes.

== Reception ==
Kreia has been positively received. Alexander Gambotto-Burke, for Eurogamer, considered Kreia to be the greatest villain in video gaming, praising her dialogue, Kestelman's "intelligent and subtle" voice-acting, and the way she forced the player into making choices and considering their decisions. IGN's Hilary Goldstein offered similar praise for her dialogue. When looking at morality in games, Gamasutra's Katherine Cross noted how Kreia's comments affected her more than many of the dark-side/light-side choices in the game. Her "practical" philosophy was also complimented by Kotaku's Phil Owen, who noted its ties to reality over the traditional moral extremes of the Sith and the Jedi. Eurogamer's Richard Cobbett considered her the most famous example of The Sith Lords' subversion of Star Wars and the first Knights of the Old Republic, commenting "Whether you agree or think she's crazy, she's a fresh breath of air for the series, and easily one of the best RPG characters ever."

The character is often considered The Sith Lords' greatest or most important character. Julie Muncy of The A.V. Club said she was the greatest part of the game and called her the game's most "captivating" character, which she credited to her "cold charisma". Muncy found herself genuinely changing her character based on her opinions, overly caring about how Kreia viewed her character. Similarly, PC Gamer credited Kreia with The Sith Lords's success, calling her "clearly haunted, bitter, manipulative, and yet right in so many ways". By looking at the Star Wars world through the view of her philosophy, they felt Obsidian made "the most thoughtful take on Star Wars we'll ever get". Robert Purchese, writing for Eurogamer, called her "the strongest and most memorable character" in the game, praising her writing and how she embodied The Sith Lords's gray areas. Allen Rausch of GameSpy described her as the game's most compelling character, commending Kreia for her challenges to his choices and noting how one example, concerning the importance of lightsabers, changed his view of the game.

The character has appeared in numerous lists, often reflecting her good reception as a Star Wars character. IGN placed her at 81 in "The Top 100 Star Wars Characters", noting her crypticness. She, along with the other Sith Lords in the game, placed second in a modified list of the best Star Wars villains, based on reader requests for characters left out of the original list. The Lords of both the first and second Knights of the Old Republic were similarly grouped as some of gaming's best Star Wars characters by Joe Juba of Game Informer, calling most of them "cooler and better developed" than the Sith Lords in the actual Star Wars films. The character was ranked seventh among Game Informer's "Top Ten Female Villains in Video Games" by Liz Lanier, saying that "Kreia is one of the few female Sith Lords of the Star Wars universe, but she represents women of the dark side relatively ruthlessly." The "struggle" against her was called one of "25 greatest Star Wars moments in Xbox history" by Edwin Evans-Thirlwell writing for GamesRadar, who called the reveal of her agenda "compelling" despite being exposition.

Not all reception of the character was positive. Adam Rosenburg of UGO Networks listed Kreia as one of the worst Star Wars expanded universe characters, considering her at the center of Knights of the Old Republic II's "stupidity" and criticizing her Sith name. Gamasutra's Christopher Buecheler, the "Resident Cynic", found Kreia's comments "a bit trite and condescending". Buecheler also faulted how gaining Influence with Kreia was essential to understanding the main plot of the game.

In a moment described as "(in)famous" by Cross, on Nar Shaddaa the player may give a beggar money or leave him; if he is given the money, Kreia shows how he is targeted and attacked, and if he is refused, Kreia reveals he attacks others. Owen called this moment the crystallization of the game's gray areas. Anthony Brock of Gamers Hell noted how it led to him passionately arguing with a game character, complimenting Obsidian for how involved he felt. Cobbett similarly highlighted the moment when praising the character. Buecheler, however, criticized the scene for using an unlikely chance event to make its point.

Kreia won "Best Character" in GameSpy's 2005 game of the year awards. They called her a "deeply unpleasant, highly disturbing, and incredibly hateful person", but also "easily the most intriguing, complicated, enigmatic, well-designed and nuanced character in a video game [in 2005]". She was also nominated for GameSpot's 2004 "Best New Character" award, though lost to "The Boss" in Metal Gear Solid 3: Snake Eater.

=== Avellone retrospective ===
Avellone has said he felt he failed in creating a sympathetic Sith Lord, recalling buglists by QA testers referring to her as "that crusty annoying lady," and he considered the ending's explanations of her motivations more "hamfisted" than sympathetic. However, in an interview with 1UP.com, he called Kreia, along with the Handmaiden, his favorite character after T3-M4, citing the mystery surrounding her. He called his favorite "unexpected turn" in the game the revelation of Kreia being neither fully good nor evil. In another interview, this time with Star Wars fansite EU Cantina, he called his favorite character either Kreia or T3, and called her scene where she explains her relationship with the Force one of his favorites in the game.

== Analysis ==
"Sometimes you face a situation with no good options, where tokenistic acts of morality may have unforeseen consequences. It's an interesting case where the restriction of player choice paradoxically opens up an exploratory space for the player."

— "Moral Code: Learning from 'Lawful Good' in roleplaying games", Katherine Cross

Alexander Gambotto-Burke felt the character was a presentation of Avellone's criticisms of the Star Wars mythos and the morality presented in most post-Garriott video games, and called her "a tutorial, an incentive to explore moral avenues you might have otherwise ignored". Gambotto-Burke considered her not purely evil, and felt even at the end of the game "you can't help but see her as a flawed visionary". GameSpot considered her point to be for the player to move on from "self-defeating" nihilism and realize "the act of choice is what gives form and pattern to the universe".

In her piece analyzing game morality, Katherine Cross highlighted the beggar scene on Nar Shaddaa. Cross noted how it illustrated Kreia's morality, cast doubt on "tokenist" moral acts, and highlighted the player's own powerlessness. Hilary Goldstein noted how her philosophical points questioned the roles of the Jedi and the Sith.

== See also ==
- Blindness in literature
- Will to power
