= Star Wars Knights of the Old Republic II: The Sith Lords =

2004 video game

- Developer: Obsidian Entertainment (Note: Aspyr ported the game to Linux and OS X, as well as serving as developers of the 2015 re-release on Steam, and the 2022 port for Nintendo Switch.)
- Publisher: LucasArts
- Producer: Chris Parker
- Designer: Chris Avellone
- Programmer: Chris Jones
- Artist: Aaron Meyers
- Writer: Chris Avellone
- Composer: Mark Griskey
- Series: Star Wars: Knights of the Old Republic
- Engine: Odyssey Engine
- Platforms: Xbox; Microsoft Windows; Linux; OS X; Android; iOS; Nintendo Switch
- Release: December 6, 2004: Xbox; NA: December 6, 2004; EU: February 11, 2005; AU: February 15, 2005 Microsoft Windows; NA: February 8, 2005; EU: February 11, 2005; AU: February 15, 2005 Linux, OS X; WW: July 21, 2015 Android, iOS; WW: December 18, 2020 Nintendo Switch; WW: June 8, 2022
- Genre: Role-playing
- Mode: Single-player

Star Wars Knights of the Old Republic II: The Sith Lords is a role-playing video game developed by Obsidian Entertainment and published by LucasArts. It is the sequel to BioWare's Star Wars: Knights of the Old Republic and was released for the Xbox on December 6, 2004, for Microsoft Windows on February 8, 2005, for OS X and Linux on July 21, 2015, for Android and iOS on December 18, 2020 and for Nintendo Switch on June 8, 2022. Like its predecessor, it is set in the Star Wars universe 4,000 years before the events of the film Episode I: The Phantom Menace and is based on the d20 System developed by Wizards of the Coast.

The game uses the Odyssey Engine, which was originally used in Knights of the Old Republic. Initial story development began before the original Knights of the Old Republic was released, and development began in October 2003, after BioWare offered Obsidian their Star Wars license due to being confident in their previous work.

Knights of the Old Republic II starts five years after the events of the first game and follows the story of The Exile, a Jedi Knight who was exiled from the Jedi Order. During this time, the Jedi Order has been almost completely wiped out by the Sith. The game begins with the protagonist regaining consciousness on an asteroid mining facility. After the player escapes with the help of their party members, they find the person who exiled them ten years ago, who sends the protagonist on a mission to seek out the remaining Jedi to fight against the Sith.

The game's critical reception upon its release was generally positive; praise was given to the story, characters, and writing, which were noted to be more morally ambiguous than the original Knights of the Old Republic. The game was included in the book 1001 Video Games You Must Play Before You Die. Particular praise was given to the character of Kreia, with GameSpy naming her the best video game character of 2005. However, the game received criticism for being too similar to its predecessor in terms of graphics and gameplay systems, as well as being launched in an incomplete state. The game has since gained a cult following.

== Gameplay ==
Screenshot from the first level of the game illustrating the interface and combat system.

Knights of the Old Republic II is an action role-playing video game played from a third-person view that features pausable real-time combat. Combat and interactions with the environment and non-player characters in Knights of the Old Republic II are based on the d20 System as in Star Wars: Knights of the Old Republic. The game starts with a character creation screen with several choices to make, and there is also an option of letting the game do it automatically. There are 30 new Force powers, which are manifestations of the Force, in Knights of the Old Republic II. Like its predecessor, the game has several minigames, including swoop bike racing and a card game called Pazaak. The interface has been streamlined from the original game and party management has been made easier; for example, the player can switch between two selected weapon sets in the menu. As in the first game, the player can choose to align with either the light side or the dark side. Choosing dialogue options that are respectful and empathetic give the protagonist light side points, while options that are egotistic and evil result in dark side points.

The combat of Knights of the Old Republic II is identical to its predecessor. Several new lightsaber forms were added to the game. Each of them is useful for a different situation. For example, one is best for enemies using blaster weapons, while another would be good for recovering from using Force powers. The player can use a variety of melee and ranged weapons, including swords and firearms. Fighting unarmed is also an option. A new addition to the game is "prestige classes", add-ons to the Jedi classes that were established in Knights of the Old Republic. They allow the player character to practice in lightsaber combat or Force powers, depending on player choice.

The player can travel with up to two party members at a time, who gain experience points at the same rate as the player character. Equipment and perks for party characters can be selected for different statistical effects or abilities. Players can loot corpses and various environmental objects. The protagonist also has the ability to "influence" their party members; by doing things that impress them, the player increases their influence with them. Depending on the level of influence, party members may support the player character unconditionally or turn against the protagonist. The player can also exploit high influence by drawing party members to either the light side or the dark side, and some characters can even be trained to use the Force.

== Synopsis ==
=== Setting ===
The game takes place five years after the events of Knights of the Old Republic and 3,919 years before Episode I: The Phantom Menace, in a time when the Jedi have been nearly exterminated by the Sith. The player's character, a former Jedi Knight exiled from the Jedi Order, is referred to as "The Exile" or "Jedi Exile". Throughout the game, the Exile restores their connection to the Force while, with the help of playable companions, setting out to stop the Sith. The player makes choices that turn the Exile to either the light side or the dark side of the Force, and they travel to six planets to either help or hinder the Republic's efforts to bring peace and stability to the galaxy.

New playable locations in Knights of the Old Republic II include Telos, Onderon and its moon Dxun, Malachor V, the Peragus Mining Facility, and various starships such as the hijacked Republic cruiser Harbinger, the Sith cruiser Ravager, and Goto's yacht orbiting Nar Shaddaa. Two planets featured in the original game, Korriban and Dantooine, are revisited with ravaged buildings and intensified problems. The Ebon Hawk, the main character's ship in the first game, is also the player's transportation in Knights of the Old Republic II.

=== Characters ===
The Exile's backstory reveals that the character served under Revan during the Mandalorian Wars and ordered the activation of a devastating weapon in the climactic battle over Malachor V. The deaths that ensued created such a substantial "wound" in the Force that the character was forced to sever their connection to the Force to survive, and the Jedi Council ordered the character exiled from the Jedi Order. As the game progresses, the Jedi Exile rebuilds a connection to the Force and creates unusually strong Force Bonds with other characters and places, while unknowingly sapping Force powers.

Among the characters who join the Jedi Exile are Kreia, who acts as the Exile's mentor; Atton Rand, who pilots the Ebon Hawk; technician and Mandalorian War veteran Bao-Dur and his droid remote; the criminal droid G0-T0; and the Sith apprentice Visas Marr. T3-M4 and Canderous Ordo (now identified as "Mandalore"), both featured in the first game, also join the Exile's team. Other characters join the Exile's party under certain conditions. HK-47, who appears in the first game, joins the quest if the Exile collects and uses the parts necessary to reactivate him. Depending on the player's alignment, the Exile will either be joined by the bounty hunter Mira (light side or neutral) or by her rival, a Wookiee bounty hunter known as Hanharr (dark side). Depending on the player's gender, the Exile will either be joined by Mical the Disciple (female Exile) or Brianna the Handmaiden (male Exile).

The game features three main antagonists: Darth Traya, a mysterious assailant who remains in the dark through most of the game; Darth Sion, an undead Sith Lord who once served under Exar Kun in the Great Sith War (as seen in Tales of the Jedi); and Darth Nihilus, a Sith Lord whose physical being was destroyed due to his immense affinity to the Force. These three Sith Lords are leaders of a loose affiliation of warriors and assassins leftover from Darth Malak's empire from the previous game. Between the events of that game and this one, the Sith have launched a largely successful genocide campaign against the Jedi Order. Another major antagonist is Atris, a former member of the Jedi Council whose unethical efforts to thwart the Sith come into conflict with the Exile.

=== Plot ===
While hiding on the Harbinger, a Republic cruiser, the Exile is sedated by an HK-50 assassin droid to be delivered to a crime syndicate called the Exchange, who have put out a bounty on live Jedi. The Exile is rescued by Kreia, with whom the Exile forms a Force Bond, and the droid T3-M4 on the Ebon Hawk, and the three flee the Harbinger as it is hijacked by a squad of Sith assassins. However, their ship is damaged during the escape by the Harbinger's gunfire, and they eventually arrive at the Peragus Mining Facility. Teaming up with smuggler Atton Rand, the group escapes to the planet Telos IV. While hiding out on Telos, they encounter Atris, a surviving member of the Jedi Council who sentenced the protagonist to exile ten years prior and plans to rebuild the Jedi Order on her terms. After settling a dispute regarding the Exile's past sentence, Atris forms an uneasy alliance with them, instructing them to seek out other surviving Jedi in order to rally against the Sith. The Exile then travels to four worlds to find reclusive Jedi Masters and either beg for their aid or kill them in revenge for being exiled, depending on player choice. As the Exile continues their journey, they are joined by several individuals in their quest.

Through the game, clues and characters imply the events of from the previous installment, where the Jedi Knight Revan turned to the dark side and waged war against the Republic, were actually part of a greater plan to unify and strengthen the Republic against a true menace. Revan discovered the Mandalorian Wars were staged all along by a hidden enemy, leading him to turn voluntarily to the dark side and conquer the Republic to ready it. These hidden enemies are hinted to be Sith hiding in the Unknown Regions of the galaxy building up their own Empire. (Note: According to Chris Avellone, a potential third game would have revealed these enemies to be descendants of the ancient Sith empire of Naga Sadow.)

After finding all the Masters, the Exile travels back to Dantooine and learns that the countless deaths at Malachor V resulted in the Exile unconsciously giving up their connection to the Force, which then became the teachings of the new Sith. If the player aided the Jedi Masters, they prepare to strip the Exile of their Force connection permanently, as the Masters fear that it could result in the actual death of the Force, but Kreia reveals herself to be the former leader of the Sith and murders them all in retribution. If the player killed the Jedi Masters, Kreia attacks the Exile and leaves. Tracking Kreia to Telos, the Exile fights and defeats a corrupted Atris, from whom it is learned that Kreia plans to strengthen a massive "wound" in the Force made ten years prior in Malachor V. This "wound" had been created by the Exile during the Mandalorian Wars, when they activated a gravitational superweapon, the Mass Shadow Generator, in order to end the battle on the planet Malachor V, causing mass death and destruction. Before following her to Malachor, where Kreia had since rejoined the Sith as Darth Traya, the Exile stops a Sith invasion of Telos, defeating one of Traya's former apprentices, the Sith Lord Darth Nihilus. On Malachor V, the Exile is separated from their companions and fights through hordes of monsters on the planet's surface and the inhabitants of a large Sith Academy who survived the cataclysm. On the final floor of the academy, the Exile kills the Sith Lord Darth Sion and confronts Darth Traya in the planet's core.

The Exile defeats the Sith Lord, but before Traya dies, she delivers a prophetic vision of the future pertaining to the player's companions and the worlds that were visited over the course of the story. If the Exile's alignment is with the light side, they order the destruction of Malachor V, escape before it is destroyed, and travel into the Unknown Regions in search of Revan, who is implied to have left to find the true Sith. If the Exile is with the dark side, they remain on Malachor V as the new Dark Lord of the Sith.

== Development ==
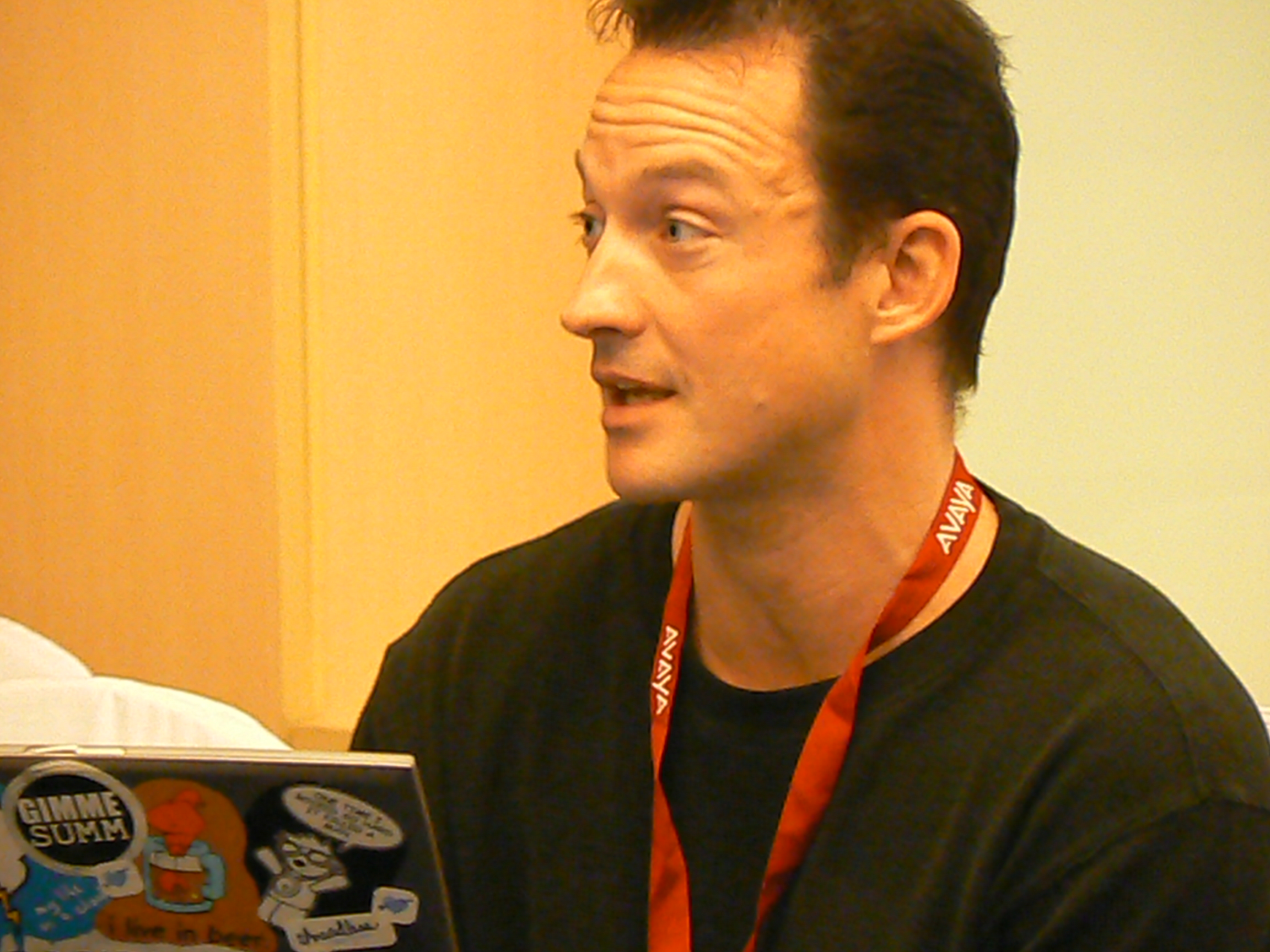
Chris Avellone (pictured) was the lead designer of Knights of the Old Republic II: The Sith Lords.

Knights of the Old Republic II was developed by Obsidian Entertainment and published by LucasArts. It is the sequel to BioWare's Knights of the Old Republic, and it uses the same Odyssey Engine as the original game. BioWare suggested that Obsidian, which was a newly formed studio at the time, should be offered the Knights of the Old Republic license due to their familiarity with Obsidian's past work and the good relationship between the two developers, as well as due to finding LucasArts' development schedule for the sequel to be too tight. The game was released in PC and Xbox versions, but due to the Xbox version being released two months prior to the PC version, it has multiple unfixed bugs.

Development of the game began in October 2003. Obsidian had only seven employees when work began and, because its contract with LucasArts had not yet been finalized, initially did not have access to a release copy of the first game. The development team later expanded to around 30 people. According to lead designer Chris Avellone, the overview of the game's story was originally drafted before the first Knights of the Old Republic was released and based partly on assumptions about BioWare's game, which Avellone discarded after eventually playing it. In preparation to write Knights of the Old Republic II, Avellone tried to learn as much about the Star Wars universe as possible. He read many books, guides, modules, and graphic novels, and the Obsidian team also relied on the first Knights of the Old Republic and the original Star Wars films for inspiration. Avellone said that Obsidian recognized one of the things that made Knights of the Old Republic great was the story and the companions, and that they tried to expand upon this by adding more depth to them. The story would see many further revisions and also some major redrafts.

Knights of the Old Republic II uses the same d20 System as the first Knights of the Old Republic with some changes, and the level cap has also been removed. For the most part, the team didn't want to redo any of the design elements from the first game, as they felt that there was no need to change anything that had already proved successful; instead, they opted to look for areas that could be improved and expanded upon them in a way that retained the base style of Knights of the Old Republic. Obsidian put much work into the game's graphics, including the appearances of non-player characters. Other technological improvements include the lighting and weather effects, in addition to increasing the level sizes. Knights of the Old Republic II's lead artist was Aaron Meyers; he decided which people would join the art team after looking through "tons of applications, resumes, and demo reels", and he said that he was pleased with the number of people who wanted to work for Obsidian. Meyers also complained about the short deadline the development team had to deal with. Obsidian's COO, Chris Parker, said that the schedule set for the development team was "extremely aggressive", and that the team felt a lot of pressure because they were "making a sequel to the game of the year for 2003".

For the music, the development team felt that symphony orchestra would work best for Knights of the Old Republic II. The musical score was composed by Mark Griskey, who developed music and themes for characters and places, including the Jedi's theme, Darth Sion's theme and Darth Nihilus's theme (which both have many similarities with the Emperor's theme from Return of the Jedi). He also created a theme for the main character, which is heard occasionally when the player experiences internal conflict. The approximately 55-minute score was recorded by the Sinfonia Orchestra in Seattle. The opening crawl utilizes the version of John Williams' main Star Wars theme that was re-recorded for the prequel trilogy.

When Obsidian was preparing to present Knights of the Old Republic II at E3 2004, they tried to fit as much information as they could, saying that it would need to be a duration of 30 minutes as it was the only E3 event it would be showcased at; however, due to the limited time frame, they would have to cut it down to a five- to ten-minute presentation. During this time, none of the levels Obsidian designed were ready to be shown, so they picked three levels and put them through a schedule to finish them on time. The demo was finished a few days before the event, and the game was presented in May 2004. The first trailer for Knights of the Old Republic II was later unveiled in July 2004, and the official website was launched in October.

The short development schedule contributed to difficulties completing the game. When looking back at Knights of the Old Republic II in a 2013 interview, Avellone said that because of LucasArts forcing Obsidian to finish the game in a short time frame of 14 to 16 months, the game ended up being in an "unfinished" state. Avellone later attributed this partly to Obsidian attempting to include too many features rather than reducing the project's scope, identifying the minigames, redesigned interface and numerous in-engine cinematics as areas that consumed development time. Although a delay would have incurred substantial contractual penalties, members of Obsidian emphasized that LucasArts also provided significant assistance, including sending quality-assurance staff to the studio and helping to complete the game's cinematics.

Obsidian's co-founder, Feargus Urquhart, said that the game was originally going to be released in 2005, but it was later moved up to December 2004 after E3; according to him, Obsidian had to choose between "get[ting] in trouble or get[ting] it done". Due to this, several cuts had to be made; one of the most major was the droid planet M4-78, which was entirely removed from the game after the 2004 E3 event when the team realized that they wouldn't be able to fit it into the schedule. M4-78's designer, Kevin Saunders, explained that he moved assets from that planet to Nar Shaddaa's yacht level in order to complete it on time, which was prior also likely to be cut from the game.

== Release ==
The Xbox version of Knights of the Old Republic II went gold on November 23, 2004; it was later released on December 6, 2004 in the United States, and the PC version was released on February 8, 2005. In Europe, the game was released simultaneously for both platforms on February 11. The game was later re-released in August 2012 on the digital distribution platform, Steam, and in January 2015 on GOG.com. On July 21, 2015, OS X and Linux versions were released along with new support for Steam Workshop and other Steamworks features, controller input, and modern widescreen resolutions up to 5K. Backward compatibility for the Xbox One was announced in April 2018. An iOS and Android version was released on December 18, 2020. The Nintendo Switch version of Knights of the Old Republic II was released by Aspyr on June 8, 2022. The release was marked with a major bug that rendered the game unbeatable. A hotfix was later released on June 30, 2022.

== Reception ==
=== Commercial performance ===
According to The NPD Group, Knights of the Old Republic II sold 458,000 copies in North America during the month of December 2004. It entered their chart for the month at number 11, and at number 3 on the Xbox-only chart. After its North American release on Windows, it debuted at number 2 on the PC chart for the month of February. In the United Kingdom, the game debuted at the top of the weekly chart, beating Blizzard Entertainment's much-anticipated online game World of Warcraft, which was released in the same week. Eurogamer reported that in the UK Knights of the Old Republic II sold much more in its first week than the first game, which the website speculates was helped by the former's simultaneous release on Windows and Xbox in PAL regions, as opposed to the latter's initial Xbox-only release. During 2005 alone, the Xbox version sold more than 60,000 copies in the region.

By early 2006, Knights of the Old Republic II had sold almost 1.5 million copies. Its sales in the United States alone reached 1.275 million by 2008.

=== Critical reception ===
Reception

Aggregate scores
Aggregator	Score		
Aggregator	NS	PC	Xbox
GameRankings	N/A	86%	86%
Metacritic	76/100	85/100	86/100

Review scores
Publication	Score		
Publication	NS	PC	Xbox
1Up.com	N/A	N/A	B
Computer Gaming World	N/A	90/100	N/A
Eurogamer	N/A	N/A	8/10
GamePro	N/A	4.5/5	4.5/5
GameSpot	N/A	8.5/10	8.5/10
GameSpy	N/A	4/5	N/A
GameZone	N/A	8.9/10	9.3/10
Hardcore Gamer	4/5	N/A	N/A
IGN	N/A	8.7/10	9.3/10
Nintendo Life	7/10	N/A	N/A
Nintendo World Report	5/10 (Note: Originally rated 8/10 in June 2022, but later re-rated to a 5/10 in June 2023 due to Aspyr's cancelation of its "restored content DLC".)	N/A	N/A
RPGamer	3/5	N/A	N/A
TouchArcade	4/5	N/A	N/A

Knights of the Old Republic II was met with positive reception upon its release; on Metacritic, it has an aggregate score of 85/100 and 86/100 on the PC and Xbox versions respectively, indicating "generally favorable reviews" according to the site. IGN said that there is a bulk of pressure involved with developing the sequel to a game from a different developer which won several "Game of the Year" awards, and that Obsidian delivered. The review also said that it will not disappoint fans of the original game and that it is mostly similar to it in terms of the model. GamePro praised both the first and second Knights of the Old Republic and said that the second game continues the series' tradition of not fixing what is not broken. GameSpot echoed this statement, also saying that both the good things and the shortcomings from the first game are present in Knights of the Old Republic II.

GameSpy compared the game to The Empire Strikes Back from the original Star Wars film trilogy in that it is the best of the series in terms of story, and also said that the game has the best story in a video game since Planescape: Torment. 1UP.com wrote that Obsidian surpassed the original Knights of the Old Republic in terms of the writing, saying that the plot is more consistent, the dialogue is edgier and the moral choices are more significant; Computer Gaming World agreed, writing, "your decision making, as you pursue a light or dark path, is more ambiguous, with more unexpected consequences". Eurogamer said that compared to the original game, Knights of the Old Republic II's plot is "far more grey". The review also said that planets are "better developed and paced". GameZone wrote that the game is a "Must Buy" for people who like well-written characters and story.

The combat was generally well-received, with some reviewers noting that it is mostly unchanged from the original Knights of the Old Republic. GameSpot compared the combat from the first Knights of the Old Republic to the second, saying that it is not well-balanced in both; however, the reviewer wrote that it helps the combat remain spontaneous. GameZone said that the combat is not changed from the first Knights of the Old Republic to the second, but that this is a good thing since the combat in the original was enjoyable. IGN praised the game's AI, saying that it is easy to control the main character alone without controlling the party members. GameSpy's reviewer, on the other hand, said that he encountered problems with the combat AI that were not present in the original Knights of the Old Republic.

GameSpot criticized Knights of the Old Republic II's graphics, calling them "lackluster". GameSpy's reviewer felt that the game's graphics were disappointing, calling them "a little dated" and "half-baked". The reviewer further criticized the graphics for looking the same as they were in the first game of the series, saying that they could only be considered "good" during the release of that game. GameZone said that the game looks exactly the same as the original Knights of the Old Republic and that it does not compare to the majority of mainstream games released at the time. GameSpy called the music in the game "excellent"; however, the reviewer noted that some of it is re-used from the first game of the series. The GameSpy reviewer also said that while the majority of the voice-acting is good, there are "a few more examples of bad voice-acting" than in the first Knights of the Old Republic. GameZone said that the "top-notch" voice acting complements the game's very well-written dialogue, and also praised the game's sound effects.

The game was criticized for its glitches; several players reported having problems with pathfinding bugs. 1UP.com's reviewer condemned Knights of the Old Republic II for having the same bugs and technical issues as in the first game, saying that his party "still had a tendency to warp and skip around the map at times", and he also criticized the pathfinding in the game. GameSpy said that the game's bugs are "hard to forgive", and that these issues did not occur in the first Knights of the Old Republic. In a different article, GameSpy said that the game is incomplete, and attributed this to its rushed deadline.

GameSpy called Kreia the best video game character of 2005, saying that she was "easily the most intriguing, complicated, enigmatic, well-designed and nuanced character in a video game this year". The game received runner-up placements in GameSpot's 2004 "Best Role-playing Game", "Best Voice Acting", "Best New Character" and "Best Game Based on a TV or Film Property" award categories across all platforms. In 2010, the game was included as one of the titles in the book 1001 Video Games You Must Play Before You Die.

== Modding ==
Along with several official patches, a notable fan-made mod called The Sith Lords Restored Content Modification or TSLRCM serves as an unofficial patch by fixing around 500 remaining bugs, along with restoring most of the content that was cut from the game. There were also methods found by the community for improving compatibility on modern PC operating systems.

The mod was endorsed by Aspyr and set to be released with the Nintendo Switch version of the game as free DLC. However, in June 2023, Aspyr announced that the restored content was cancelled without giving a reason. In December 2025, after a lawsuit involving Aspyr went public, it was revealed that Aspyr was unable to secure permission from all 22 people involved with the original mod and that Disney preferred to credit the developers' original names rather than their gamertags.
