= Exodus (2027 video game) =

Upcoming video game

- Developer: Archetype Entertainment (Note: Additional work by Climax Studios, Certain Affinity, Studio Gobo and D3T)
- Publisher: Wizards of the Coast
- Director: Chris King
- Producers: James Ohlen; Chad Robertson
- Writers: Peter F. Hamilton; Drew Karpyshyn
- Engine: Unreal Engine 5
- Platforms: PlayStation 5; Windows; Xbox Series X/S
- Release: April 7, 2027
- Genre: Role-playing
- Mode: Single-player

Exodus is an upcoming science fiction role-playing game developed by Archetype Entertainment, a studio founded by former BioWare developers James Ohlen, Chad Robertson, and Drew Karpyshyn, and published by Wizards of the Coast. The game is set in the far future within the Omega Centauri cluster and has themes of exploration, survival, and moral complexity. It is the first game to be developed by Archetype Entertainment since its founding in 2019.

The game gained significant attention following its reveal at The Game Awards in December 2023, particularly due to the involvement of Academy Award-winning actor and Interstellar lead Matthew McConaughey, who voices character C.C. Orlev. The game focuses on time dilation due to ultrarelativistic travel and its ramifications pertaining to interpersonal interactions, technological advancement, and other subjects.

Exodus is part of Hasbro's broader initiative to expand its footprint in the video game industry, alongside projects tied to other popular franchises such as G.I. Joe and Dungeons & Dragons. The game's universe has also been expanded through supplemental media, including a two-part series of novels titled Exodus: The Archimedes Engine, (released in 2024) and Exodus: The Helium Sea, (released in 2026) by Peter F. Hamilton, and an actual play series called Star Heist: An Exodus Story, designed to showcase the game's lore and setting. Exodus is set to release for PlayStation 5, Windows and Xbox Series X/S on April 7, 2027.

== Setting ==
Exodus is set in the far future, within the Omega Centauri cluster, a region of space approximately 16,000 light-years away containing roughly ten million densely-packed stars. By the time the spinoff novel takes place, in 42,350 CE, more than a million habitable worlds have been settled within the cluster.

The game's timeline spans tens of thousands of years of future history, beginning with Earth's environmental collapse around 2200 CE, which prompts the launch of arkships to search for new worlds. Several fleets reach the cluster by approximately 18,000 CE, initiating large-scale colonization.

Subsequent millennia see the rise and fall of various interstellar polities, the emergence of genetically modified human-descendant species referred to as "Celestials", and the construction of an interstellar transport system called the "Gates of Heaven" by a dominant faction known as the Elohim. Around 41,500 CE, a previously lost human fleet arrives in the Malakbel system, establishing a settlement on the moon Lidon, built upon the remains of an extinct alien civilization.

The game's narrative follows "Travelers", a faction seeking advanced relics called "Remnants", and involves multiple human and alien groups with differing agendas. Players encounter various factions and characters whose alliances and rivalries influence the progression of the story, with moral choices affecting political and personal outcomes within the galaxy.

== Development ==
Exodus is being developed by Archetype Entertainment, a studio founded by former BioWare staff James Ohlen, Chad Robertson, and Drew Karpyshyn. The founders previously worked on role-playing games, including the Mass Effect series and Star Wars: Knights of the Old Republic. Archetype Entertainment operates under Wizards of the Coast, a subsidiary of Hasbro.

Development began shortly after the studio's formation, with the stated aim of creating a story-focused role-playing game set in a science fiction setting. Science fiction author Peter F. Hamilton serves as a creative consultant and writer for the game's expanded universe.

The game is being built in Unreal Engine 5, with planned features including large-scale planetary exploration, interplanetary and interstellar travel, and artificial intelligence systems designed to create interactive encounters with characters and factions.

According to the developers, player choice will affect the narrative, with branching storylines, multiple paths, and varying character outcomes.''

== Expanded universe ==
The Exodus tabletop role-playing game is a game tie-in, releasing in January 2027, placed in the same universe as the game, and utilizing similar mechanics to Archetype Entertainment's sister franchise Dungeons & Dragons.

Exodus: The Archimedes Engine and Exodus: The Helium Sea are part of a duology of books written by Peter F. Hamilton set in the Exodus universe.

Amazon Prime Video's Secret Level features an episode set in the Exodus universe.
