= Bastila Shan =

Fictional Star Wars character

- Star Wars character
- Render of Bastila Shan for 2003's Star Wars: Knights of the Old Republic.
- First appearance: Star Wars: Knights of the Old Republic (2003)
- Created by: BioWare
- Voiced by: Jennifer Hale

In-universe information
- Species: Human
- Gender: Female
- Occupation: Jedi Knight
- Affiliation: Jedi Order; Galactic Republic; Sith
- Family: Helena Shan (mother); Revan (husband); Vaner Shan (son); Satele Shan (descendant); Theron Shan (descendant)

Bastila Shan is a fictional character in the Star Wars franchise, first appearing in BioWare's 2003 role-playing video game Star Wars: Knights of the Old Republic. She is a Jedi who joins the player character during the war between the Galactic Republic and the Sith forces led by Darth Malak. Bastila is known in the game for her rare Force power of Battle Meditation, which allows her to influence the outcome of large-scale battles. She is voiced by Jennifer Hale, who is expected to reprise the role in the planned remake of Knights of the Old Republic.

Bastila plays a central role in Knights of the Old Republic's story. Bastila is a young Jedi struggling with the scale of her powers and her mysterious connection to the game's player character. She is pursued by Malak because of her Battle Meditation; it is revealed that the player character was formerly the Sith Lord Darth Revan, and that she and Revan inadvertently developed a Force bond during an attack that left Revan an amnesiac. Depending on the player's choices, Bastila may be redeemed after falling to the dark side, killed, or join Revan as a Sith apprentice. Later Star Wars Legends continuity depicts her as redeemed by a male Revan.

The character has been discussed by critics and developers in relation to Hale's performance, her light-side and dark-side characterization, her role in the Revan plot twist, and her place among Star Wars characters originating from video games. Bastila has also appeared in later Star Wars works and merchandise.

== Conception and creation ==
According to lead designer James Ohlen, Bastila was among the characters whose names and personalities drew from a tabletop Star Wars: The Roleplaying Game pen-and-paper campaign he had previously run. Early in development, Bastila's role in the story was planned to be as Vima Sunrider, the daughter of Nomi Sunrider from the Tales of the Jedi comics. This connection to existing Expanded Universe continuity was later abandoned. During development, the character was briefly named Sareth Dorn. The final name Bastila, and elements of the final costume design, were originally associated with another Jedi companion who was later renamed Juhani.

=== Voice and performance ===
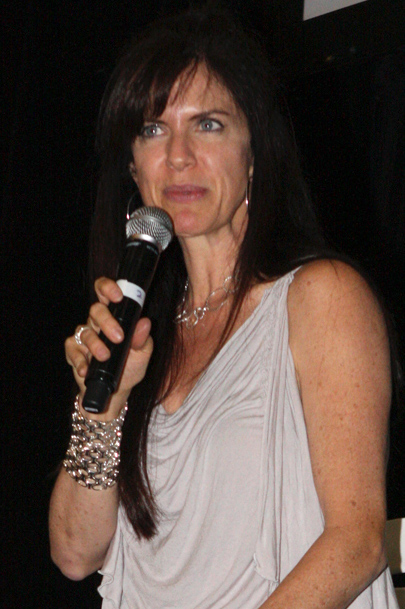
Jennifer Hale voices Bastila Shan.

Darragh O'Farrell, LucasArts' voice-over director, said Knights of the Old Republic included hundreds of speaking characters and thousands of lines of dialogue, and that the branching script required actors to perform lines that could change according to player choice. O'Farrell said that voice acting was especially important to BioWare's companion design because the player needed to believe that the characters travelling with them were complete individuals rather than static quest-givers.

Jennifer Hale recalled that the project was one of the earliest games in which she remembered playing a character who could shift between two distinct moral positions. After recording an initial set of lines, she returned for another session and was told that Bastila would change sides, requiring her to perform a darker version of the same character. Hale later said she did not know the game's major plot twist while recording because she encountered the story through the script as she performed it. She described herself as surprised both by the revelation that the player character was Revan and by Bastila's possible fall to the dark side.

Hale used a British accent informed by her dialect training for Bastila, represented in Star Wars as a Coruscanti dialect. O'Farrell compared Hale's presence as a performer to Liam Neeson's, saying that she conveyed authority without forcing it and brought strength to the character through demeanor rather than overt emphasis.

=== Character ===
In Knights of the Old Republic, Bastila is depicted as disciplined but impulsive, with the official Databank describing her as brash despite her Jedi training. Her importance to the Republic comes from her ability in Battle Meditation, a rare Force power that can strengthen allies and weaken enemies in battle. In the game, non-player characters repeatedly emphasize the strategic value of this power, making Bastila a major target for the Sith. Although she is tasked with guiding Revan back toward the Jedi, the game also presents her as tempted by anger, pride, and fear, leading to her fall to the dark side late in the story. Bastila may become a romance option if the player character is male.

== Appearances ==
=== In Knights of the Old Republic ===
Bastila first appears in Star Wars: Knights of the Old Republic as a Jedi assigned to the Republic ship Endar Spire. Sith forces attack the ship while searching for her because of her Battle Meditation. When the ship is destroyed, Bastila is captured by the Black Vulkars gang on Taris and later rescued by the player character and their companions.

After escaping Taris aboard the Ebon Hawk, Bastila accompanies the player character to the Jedi Enclave on Dantooine. She shares visions with the player character that lead them to search for Star Maps connected to the Star Forge, the source of Malak's military power. During the journey, she is shown as both a mentor figure and a companion whose connection to the player character becomes increasingly important to the story.

The group's capture aboard Malak's flagship, the Leviathan, leads to the revelation that the player character is Revan. Bastila admits that she was part of the Jedi strike team sent to capture Revan, and that she saved Revan after Malak betrayed his master. The Jedi Council then erased Revan's memories and gave Revan a new identity.

Bastila is later captured by Malak and tortured until she falls to the dark side. She confronts Revan on Lehon and later on the Star Forge. If the player follows the light side, Revan may redeem her or kill her. If redeemed, she uses Battle Meditation to support the Republic fleet against the Sith. If the player follows the dark side, Revan and Bastila defeat Malak and rule the Sith together.

=== Later appearances ===
Bastila may appear or be referenced in Star Wars Knights of the Old Republic II: The Sith Lords, depending on the player's chosen account of Revan's gender and alignment. Later Star Wars Legends continuity adopts the outcome in which Bastila is redeemed by Revan, whom she later marries, and survives the destruction of the Star Forge.

Drew Karpyshyn's novel Star Wars: The Old Republic: Revan depicts Bastila after the events of the first game as Revan's wife and the mother of their son, Vaner Shan. Her descendants include Satele Shan and Theron Shan, who appear in material connected to Star Wars: The Old Republic.

Both Jedi and Sith versions of Bastila are unlockable characters in the mobile game Star Wars: Galaxy of Heroes. In September 2021, Lucasfilm Games announced Star Wars: Knights of the Old Republic – Remake, with Hale reprising her role as Bastila.

== Promotion and merchandise ==
Bastila has appeared in licensed Star Wars merchandise and fan-selected toy campaigns. She was nominated among other Expanded Universe characters in ToyFare's 2006 Fan's Choice poll for a requested action figure design.

== Reception ==
Bastila has received attention from critics for her role in Knights of the Old Republic, her moral conflict, her romance with Revan, and Hale's performance. In his book published by Boss Fight Books, Alex Kane described Bastila as the emotional anchor and "beating heart" of the game. John Walker of Eurogamer wrote that he liked Bastila as a character despite finding her "nagging" and her voice "a touch too snooty".

Hale's performance has been discussed in later retrospectives about the game's voice acting and narrative structure. Kane crediting Hale's performance for much of the character's effect. PC Gamer reported that Hale was surprised by both the Revan reveal and Bastila's potential fall to the dark side, noting that the branching story required her to perform different versions of the same character. GamesRadar+ similarly reported Hale's surprise at the twist and described Bastila as instrumental to the game's climax because of her bond with Revan.

Bastila's romance subplot has also received attention in commentary on BioWare romances. Elizabeth Ballou of PlayStation Lifestyle discussed Bastila among memorable BioWare romance options, describing the relationship with Revan as part of the appeal of Knights of the Old Republic. Bastila has also been recognized in broader discussions of Star Wars video game characters. GameSpot included her in its list of notable Star Wars characters who originated in video games. IGN ranked Bastila 62nd in its list of the top 100 Star Wars characters, and she placed 69th in IGN's 2020 fan poll for the best Star Wars character.

Some commentary has focused on Bastila's potential for adaptation outside video games. Corey Plante of Inverse argued that Bastila should be central to any adaptation of Knights of the Old Republic, describing her as a major figure in Revan's story and as a character whose arc moves between heroism, villainy, and redemption. Brittany Vincent of MTV included Bastila among female Star Wars characters she considered deserving of more appearances, while Megan Crouse of Den of Geek argued that Bastila had enough strengths and flaws to carry a television series.

Former LucasArts producer Mike Gallo recalled seeing fans dressed as characters from Knights of the Old Republic like Bastila and Darth Malak at Comic-Con after the game's release. Cosplayer Molly Chu told Kane that she was drawn to Bastila's fall to the dark side and subsequent redemption in the game'd narrative, and spent six months recreating the character's costume. Chu regarded Bastila's clothing as atypical for a Jedi and perceived Asian influence in its design; she also recalled other convention attendees approaching her to express their affection for the character.

=== Analysis ===
Harry J. Brown discusses Bastila in Videogames and Education as part of an analysis of Knights of the Old Republic and dramatic structure. Brown connects the game to Aristotelian ideas of plot and agency, and notes that Knights of the Old Republic received the 2004 Game Developers Choice Award for writing. Valerie Estelle Frankel, in Star Wars Meets the Eras of Feminism, gives a more critical reading of Bastila's arc. Frankel describes Bastila's fall to the dark side as cliched and weakening, despite the character's initially striking presentation.

Bastila has also been discussed in relation to BioWare's romance design. In Press Start, Brianna Dym contrasts the heterosexual romance arcs involving Bastila and Carth Onasi with Juhani's more limited same-sex romance, using Knights of the Old Republic as part of a broader analysis of how BioWare presented queer romance in its early role-playing games. In this context, Bastila's romance functions as one of the game's more direct romantic subplots against which Juhani's more indirect romance has been compared.

== Bibliography ==
- Kane, Alex (2019). Star Wars: Knights of the Old Republic. Boss Fight Books. ISBN 978-1-940535-21-0.
