= The City of Ravens =

2000 novel by Richard Baker

- Paperback edition cover
- Author: Richard Baker
- Cover artist: William O'Connor
- Language: English
- Series: The Cities
- Genre: Fantasy
- Publisher: Wizards of the Coast
- Publication date: December 2000
- Publication place: United States
- Media type: Print (paperback)
- Pages: 312 (paperback edition)
- ISBN: 0-7869-1401-7 (paperback edition)
- OCLC: 45469205
- Followed by: Temple Hill

The City of Ravens is a fantasy novel by Richard Baker that is set in city of Raven's Bluff in the Forgotten Realms fictional universe. It is the first novel in the "Cities" series. It is followed by Temple Hill and various other novels by various authors such as Drew Karpyshyn and Mel Odom.

== Plot ==
The story follows a petty thief called Jack Ravenwild, who is hired by the beautiful Elana to find a very special book. In the same tenday (the Realms equivalent of a week), he resorts to spying on another perfect woman, a mage named Zandria, to try to get information. But, the beautiful Illyth invites him to the game of masks, and at the same time he fears for his friend Anders, wanted by the evil Brothers Kuldath for stealing their ruby. Soon Jack finds both good and evil people following him through the streets of Ravens Bluff.

== Publication history ==
- 2000, USA, Wizards of the Coast ISBN 0-7869-1401-7, Pub date 1 December 2000, Paperback
