= Archetype Entertainment =

American video game developer

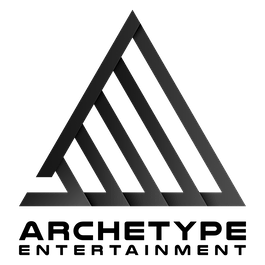
- Type: Division
- Industry: Video games
- Founded: April 2019; 7 years ago
- Headquarters: Austin, Texas, United States
- Key people: James Ohlen (head of studio); Chad Robertson; (vice president and general manager)
- Owner: Hasbro
- Parent: Wizards of the Coast
- Website: archetype-entertainment.com

Archetype Entertainment is an American video game development studio established as a division of game publisher Wizards of the Coast, itself a subsidiary of Hasbro. The Austin, Texas-based studio was created by Wizards in April 2019 to develop new intellectual property outside of Wizards' existing Dungeons & Dragons and Magic: The Gathering franchises. Archetype is notable for having drawn talent from BioWare; Studio Head, James Ohlen, who had previously worked on Dungeons & Dragons role-playing games such as the Baldur's Gate series among other titles along with Chad Robertson and Drew Karpyshyn.

== History ==
Wizards had announced that it was establishing a new Austin studio with James Ohlen as its lead on April 24, 2019. Ohlen, who had retired from BioWare in 2018, had planned to distance himself from the video games industry. Ohlen had established a tabletop role-playing game publishing company, Arcanum Worlds, and had refused multiple lucrative offers from other video game companies for work. Ohlen changed his mind based on the offer that Wizards had given him, which included the necessary freedom to lead the studio the way he wanted, and a chance to return to the type of projects at BioWare that he felt were personal to him, like Baldur's Gate. Wizards' president Chris Cocks said that Ohlen was the right person to help build up Wizards' IP profile beyond Dungeons & Dragons and Magic: The Gathering based on his past work at BioWare. The studio had not been named, but both Ohlen and Cocks stated that the plan was to develop brand new IP in an "organic" manner to figure out the larger goals for the property, such as which platforms to develop for, and did not set any fixed milestones.

Wizards revealed the name Archetype Entertainment in January 2020, along with news that another former BioWare member, Chad Robertson, had been brought on board as vice president and general manager. Wizards also affirmed that the first IP being developed by Archetype would be a science fiction role-playing game. A month later, Drew Karpyshyn, yet another former BioWare member, came on board Archetype as lead writer. Karpyshyn said that while his interest in video game development waned as BioWare had changed over the years, "my passion has been rekindled. The feel in the studio reminds me of my early days at BioWare; I can feel the magic in the air."

During The Game Awards 2023 on December 7, 2023, Archetype revealed its first game, Exodus, starring Matthew McConaughey. A novel, Exodus: The Archimedes Engine, was released on September 17, 2024 by Peter F. Hamilton, the first in the Archimedes Engine duology.

On December 17, 2024, a narrative prequel for Exodus was featured in the 11th episode of Secret Level.
