= Star Wars: The Old Republic (novel series) =

2010s science fiction novel series

- Cover art of Fatal Alliance
- Fatal Alliance (2010); Deceived (2011); Revan (2011); Annihilation (2012)
- Author: Sean Williams (Fatal Alliance); Paul S. Kemp (Deceived); Drew Karpyshyn (Revan and Annihilation)
- Country: United States
- Language: English
- Genre: Science fiction
- Publisher: Del Rey Books
- Published: July 20, 2010 – November 13, 2012
- Media type: Hardcover
- No. of books: 4

Star Wars: The Old Republic is a science fiction novel series from the Star Wars franchise and based on the 2011 video game Star Wars: The Old Republic by BioWare. Four novels were released between 2010 and 2012. The first book, Fatal Alliance, was written by Sean Williams, the second book, Deceived, was written by Paul S. Kemp, the third and fourth books, Revan and Annihilation, were written by Drew Karpyshyn.

== Fatal Alliance ==
Star Wars: The Old Republic: Fatal Alliance was released on July 20, 2010 in a hardcover edition. It is a prequel to the game and it is written by Australian author Sean Williams. The novel was first announced on November 10, 2008, by Sue Rostoni, the executive editor at Lucas Licensing, on the Starwars.com message boards.

This is the fifth of six Star Wars novels by Sean Williams, who also wrote the Force Heretic trilogy from the New Jedi Order series and the novelization of the 2008 video game Star Wars: The Force Unleashed and its sequel.

=== Characters ===
- Darth Chratis - A human male Sith Lord and master of Eldon Ax. He is depicted on the cover art of the novel.
- Eldon Ax - A human female Sith apprentice to Darth Chratis. Described as being small in stature and weight and having long, red dreadlocks.
- Dao Stryver - A Gektl (sentient species of bipedal reptilians) female Mandalorian warrior. She is listed as a male in the Dramatis Personae section of the book, but is later revealed to be a female at the end of the novel.
- Jet Nebula - A human male smuggler and captain of his ship, the Auriga Fire.
- Larin Moxla - A Kiffar female Republic trooper.
- Satele Shan - A human female and Grand Master of the Jedi Order. She also appears in the video game Star Wars: The Old Republic and is a direct descendant of Bastila Shan and Revan, central characters from the previous BioWare game Star Wars: Knights of the Old Republic.
- Shigar Konshi - A Kiffar male Jedi Padawan and apprentice of Satele Shan.
- Ula Vii - An Epicanthix male Imperial agent.

== Deceived ==
Star Wars: The Old Republic: Deceived is the second book in the series written by Paul S. Kemp. Kemp also wrote the short story "Star Wars: The Old Republic: The Third Lesson" which was first released in the Star Wars Insider magazine in 2011 and later collected in the anthology Star Wars Insider: Fiction Collection Vol. 2 (2021). He also wrote the Star Wars novels Crosscurrent (2010) and Riptide (2011).

== Revan ==
Star Wars: The Old Republic: Revan is the third book in the series written by Drew Karpyshyn and released on November 15, 2011. Revan fills in the gaps between the video games Star Wars: Knights of the Old Republic (2003) and Star Wars: Knights of the Old Republic II - The Sith Lords (2004), as well as providing a backstory for events in Star Wars: The Old Republic (2011).

=== Characters ===
- Revan - A human male Jedi who briefly served as the Sith Lord Darth Revan.
- Scourge - A Sith male who served Darth Nyriss, later becoming the Emperor's Wrath.
- Meetra Surik - A human female who was exiled from the Jedi Order for fighting in the Mandalorian Wars.
- Canderous Ordo - A human male Mandalorian who leads the Mandalorians as Mandalore the Preserver.
- Bastila Shan - A human female Jedi Knight who is married to Revan.
- T3-M4 - An astromech droid that serves Revan.
- Darth Nyriss - A Sith female who serves on the Sith Dark Council.
- The Sith Emperor / Lord Vitiate - A human male who serves as the immortal Emperor of the reformed Sith Empire.

=== Plot ===
Two years after the defeat of Darth Malak, (Note: As depicted in Star Wars: Knights of the Old Republic (2003)) the exiled Jedi Revan is married to Bastila Shan and lives on Coruscant, plagued by nightmares of his time as a Sith Lord. Desperate to learn about his past, he attempts to contact Meetra Surik, his former subordinate from the Mandalorian Wars, but learns she was ousted from the Order and has left Republic space. Revan learns from Canderous Ordo that a group of Mandalorians is searching for the mask of Mandalore the Ultimate, the traditional leader of the Mandalorian people, which was taken by Revan during the war to break their spirit. Before leaving, he learns from Bastila that she is pregnant, and he convinces her to stay.

Meanwhile, the Sith Empire has secretly rebuilt itself on the planet Dromund Kaas. Feuds among the Sith Dark Council lead Darth Nyriss to employ the Sith apprentice Scourge as her protector. Despite suspicions of Nyriss' treachery, Scourge earns her trust after killing Darth Xedrix. Nyriss tells Scourge she plans to overthrow the Sith Emperor, doubtful of his ability to lead. She takes Scourge to her homeworld of Nathema, where she recounts a legend surrounding the Emperor. A millennium ago, the Emperor, then known as Vitiate, overthrew his father, the Sith Lord who ruled the planet. After the original Sith Empire's defeat by the Republic, Vitiate and other Sith performed an immortality ritual that killed every living being and transferred their life energy to Vitiate. Nyriss expresses fear that the Emperor plans to risk the Empire's stability and the Sith species' well-being by invading the Republic.

Revan locates Mandalore's mask, and through a recording he left behind, discovers that the Sith manipulated Mandalore into attacking the Republic. He goes to Nathema, where Scourge and Nyriss shoot down his ship and capture him. Revan's droid, T3-M4, manages to eventually repair the ship and head back towards Republic space.

Three years later, after Meetra Surik defeated Darth Traya and destroyed Malachor V, (Note: As depicted in Star Wars Knights of the Old Republic II: The Sith Lords (2004)) Surik informs Bastila of Revan's plight and travels to Dromund Kaas disguised as a mercenary. She contacts Scourge, who is now disillusioned with the Emperor and betrays Nyriss to him. The Emperor decides to purge the Dark Council and sets his army upon them. Scourge and Meetra free Revan from his cell, and Meetra gives Revan the mask he wore during the Mandalorian Wars. Upon wearing the mask, Revan's memories return to him; After the Mandalorian Wars, Revan and his friend Malak were corrupted by the dark side of the Force. Nyriss attacks Meetra and Scourge, but Revan effortlessly kills her.

Revan, Surik, and Scourge plan to defeat the Emperor. While trying to learn the ways of the Jedi, Scourge has a vision of a Jedi Knight and the Emperor. The three fight their way to the Emperor's throne room, and Revan engages the Emperor in combat. The Emperor nearly overwhelms Revan, but T3 saves Revan by setting the Emperor ablaze; however, the Emperor destroys T3. Scourge and Surik rush to Revan's aid, and Scourge has another vision of an unspecified Jedi Knight slaying the Emperor. Scourge then kills Surik, and the Emperor gravely wounds Revan. Scourge falsely declares himself to the Emperor, who names Scourge the Emperor's Wrath, his personal enforcer.

Revan is placed in a suspension tank, where he is constantly interrogated and tortured by the Emperor. Unbeknownst to the Emperor, Revan has been slowly imposing his will upon him to slow down his planned invasion of the Republic. Scourge is rewarded with immortality in a painful process that robs him of all feeling.

Many years later, an elderly Bastila talks with her son Venar about Revan. Venar wonders if his father would be disappointed that he entered politics instead of joining the Jedi Order. Bastila assures him that he did the right thing, and that Revan has saved them from the darkness he feared would pass. Bastila then goes to sleep, dreaming of her lost husband.

== Annihilation ==
Star Wars: The Old Republic: Annihilation is the fourth entry in the series written by Drew Karpyshyn and released on November 13, 2012. News of the book was released at the Del Rey Star Wars books panel at the 2011 New York Comic-Con. It takes place just after the events of the Star Wars: The Old Republic class stories and focuses on Theron Shan. The paperback edition was released on October 29, 2013, while the UK paperback was released on May 24, 2013.

== Reception ==
Fatal Alliance debuted at #1 on the New York Times bestseller list. IGN said: "As with the Threat of Peace comic, there are too many players for the story to grow organically." Library Journal wrote: "Star Wars® fans will look forward to the latest addition to the literature of Lucas's beloved galactic classic. Libraries should expect demand."

Revan reached 8 on the New York Times bestseller list on December 4, 2011. Starburst said the character writing is uneven and ultimately deeming the book disappointing due to the lack of a satisfying conclusion. Dork Side of the Force compared the novel to the 2006 film Babel and said the book is important to the Expanded Universe because of the information regarding the Mandalorian Wars. Comic Book Resources said the novel was highly anticipated at the time of release, and the book's most remarkable events reinterpret major conflicts in the Old Republic's history.

Starburst called Annihilation "another solid effort to build upon the era of The Old Republic." Another reviewer for Starburst concluded: "The author’s appreciation of an established universe such as this is apparent, which makes the book an absolute joy to read. Complementing the Star Wars The Old Republic videogame nicely, Annihilation is not to be missed." According to the publisher Annihilation is on The New York Times Best Seller list.

== See also ==
- The Clone Republic
