= Secret Level =

2024 animated anthology series

- Genre: Anthology; Science fiction
- Created by: Tim Miller
- Supervising director: Dave Wilson
- Creative director: Jerome Denjean
- Music by: Maxime Hervé; Rob Cairns; 2WEI; Danny Bensei; Saunder Jurriaans; Kotomi
- Original language: English
- No. of seasons: 1
- No. of episodes: 15

Production
- Executive producers: Tim Miller; Dave Wilson; Jennifer Miller; Nan Morales; J. T. Petty
- Producers: Victoria Howard; Samantha Brainerd; Mike Rosemeyer
- Editors: Matt Mariska; Julian Clarke
- Running time: 8–19 minutes
- Production companies: Blur Studio; Amazon MGM Studios

Original release
- Network: Amazon Prime Video
- Release: December 10, 2024 – present

Secret Level (stylized as SΞCRΞT LΞVΞL) is an adult animated anthology series consisting of fifteen stories set in the worlds of different video games. The series was created by Tim Miller for Amazon Prime Video. It is produced by Miller's Blur Studio with Amazon MGM Studios. Dave Wilson serves as supervising director and executive producer. The voice cast includes Arnold Schwarzenegger, Patrick Schwarzenegger, Kevin Hart, Laura Bailey, Heaven Hart, Keanu Reeves, Gabriel Luna, Ariana Greenblatt, Adewale Akinnuoye-Agbaje, Michael Beach, Emily Swallow, and Claudia Doumit.

The series was announced at Gamescom on August 20, 2024. Its first eight episodes were released worldwide on December 10, 2024, with the remaining seven episodes released on December 17, 2024. The Pac-Man episode served as promotion for the at-the-time upcoming game, Shadow Labyrinth. The series has received mixed reviews from critics. In December 2024, the series was renewed for a second season.

In August 2026, it was announced that a spinoff series based on the Warhammer 40,000 episode is currently in development.

== Premise ==
The series consists of fifteen animated, standalone short stories based on the following video games and franchises:

Brand	Owners
Armored Core	FromSoftware
Concord	Sony Interactive Entertainment
Crossfire	Smilegate
Dungeons & Dragons	Wizards of the Coast
Exodus	Archetype Entertainment
Honor of Kings	TiMi Studio Group
Mega Man	Capcom
New World: Aeternum	Amazon Games
The Outer Worlds	Obsidian Entertainment
Pac-Man (Shadow Labyrinth)	Bandai Namco Entertainment
PlayStation	Sony Interactive Entertainment
Sifu	Sloclap
Spelunky	Mossmouth, LLC
Unreal Tournament	Epic Games
Warhammer 40,000: Space Marine 2	Games Workshop

== Episodes ==
No.	Title	Directed by	Written by	Animation studio	Original release date	Prod. code
1	"Dungeons & Dragons: The Queen's Cradle"	Maxime Luère, Léon Bérelle, Dominique Boidin, Rémi Kozyra	K.D. Dávila and Levin Menekse Short Story by: Brooke Bolander	Unit Image (from France)	December 10, 2024	#ATRI 104
Solon, a young boy who has been tattooed to be sacrificed by cultists, is rescued by adventurers Mora, Tally, Luzum, and Ahokal. Possessed by a malevolent force, he is comforted by Mora, who assures him that he can fight for his better nature. They are pursued by the cultists to the stronghold of a dragon, Oriel, who absorbs the dark taint from Solon as his tattoos disappear. While the others defeat their pursuers, Oriel is quickly infected by the evil and dies as Tiamat erupts from his body. The four warriors team up with Solon, who now has holy powers, to resist Tiamat. Cast: Noah Manzoor as Solon, Madeleine Knight as Mora, Laura Wohlwend as Tally, Delroy Atkinson as Luzum, Umulisa Gahiga as Ahokal, Paul Ridley as Oriel, Rita Estevanovich and Tracy Wiles as Tiamat.
2	"Sifu: It Takes a Life"	László Ruska	Rich Larson Short Story by: Rich Larson	Digic Pictures (from Hungary)	December 10, 2024	#ATRI 108
A young man, MC, visits a street vendor before spotting Sean's gang, the men who killed his father and struck MC down. Following them into a club, MC fights his way through the gang in his hunt for Sean; some manage to kill MC, but he has the ability to come back to life with greater skill, at the cost of his age. By the time he reaches Sean to fulfill his revenge, he has aged beyond Sean's recognition. His vendetta satisfied, the now elderly MC returns to the street vendor, who assumes he is his own grandfather before realizing he is the same man. Cast: Parry Shen as MC (young), Ping Wu as MC (old), Lydia Look as Li, Nelson Lee as Sean, Feodor Chin as Thug, Rae Lim as MC (child).
3	"New World: The Once and Future King"	Maxime Luère, Léon Bérelle, Dominique Boidin, Rémi Kozyra	Teleplay by : J. T. Petty and Philip Gelatt	Unit Image (from France)	December 10, 2024	#ATRI 118
King Aelstrom sets sail to conquer the island of Aeternum, but his armada is destroyed in a storm. Washing up on Aeternum's shores, Aelstrom and his advisor Scaevola, an amputee with one arm, are the sole survivors. Aelstrom attempts to knight a nearby scavenger, Urda, who instead kills him and Scaveola. They are resurrected on the beach where they arrived, realizing they can neither leave the island nor die. The arrogant, self-obsessed Aelstrom challenges the island's ruler, King Zima, in various contests for the throne, losing every time. When Scaevola admits that Aelstrom was a terrible king, Aelstrom abandons him and, obtaining magical armor and weaponry, challenges Zima again, only to still be defeated. Bored of Aelstrom's efforts to overthrow him, Zima simply drops his crown, while Scaevola suggests that Aeternum is "an eternity of second chances". Aelstrom returns to the beach to crown himself, only to realize he is all alone. He seeks Urda's help to learn blacksmithing and, after time passes, reconciles with Scaevola, gifting him a prosthetic arm forged from the crown. Cast: Arnold Schwarzenegger as King Aelstrom, Steven Pacey as Scaevola, Gabriel Luna as King Zimah, Arazou as Urda, Dana Haqjoo as Zimah's aide, Carlo Rota as Sorcerer.
4	"Unreal Tournament: Xan"	Franck Balson	Justin Rhodes	Blur Studio (from the United States)	December 10, 2024	#ATRI 102
A mining robot gains sentience and realizes that its human masters abuse robots and view them as expendable. Taking control of its comrades, the robot leads an uprising and kills their masters. The robots are arrested, and forced to compete in public gladiatorial combat as a warning against rebellion. Watching the fights, the sentient robot learns tactics and wins its own battle. A string of victories continue, as the robot gains the name XAN and the approval of the masses. Determined to learn why entire teams are losing to mining robots with no combat programming, the Gamemaster orders a technician to study the fallen robots' remains, and sends her Necris Captain and his soldiers to personally fight XAN. Realizing this plan, XAN uploads itself into the robot being examined by the technician, gaining control of the stadium itself, and defeats the Captain and his team. The Gamemaster enters the stadium with her guards to personally oversee XAN's execution, only for XAN use its control of the arena to kill the guards and ignite a rebellion with the support of the audience. Cast: Elodie Yung as The Gamemaster, Gideon Emery as Necris Captain, Mitch Eakins as Dean, Chris Payne Gilbert as Parker, Carlin James as Liandri Technician, Fred Tatasciore as Arena Announcer
5	"Warhammer 40,000: And They Shall Know No Fear"	Dave Wilson	J. T. Petty and Justin Rhodes	Blur Studio (from the United States)	December 10, 2024	#ATRI 101
Sergeant Metaurus acknowledges briefing of a mission to destroy a relic before donning his power armour, and reflects on a soldier he recruited, a boy who knew no fear, rather than needing it trained out of him to become a Space Marine. Metaurus and his squad, including Lieutenant Titus, are dropped to a planet, dragging a sarcophagus. They battle Chaos cultists, and eventually reach the relic, a statue. The sarcophagus opens to reveal a psyker, who provides the team with a psychic force field. A powerful Chaos sorcerer flanks the marines and kills the psyker, freezing time to psychically prey on each marine's deepest fear. Killing two, it reaches Metaurus, who is confronted with a vision of Titus becoming corrupted into a Chaos Marine, and the sergeant falls. Titus, the recruit without fear, resists the sorcerer's attack and kills it. Dragging his mentor to safety, he contacts the marines' spacecraft and calls in an orbital strike on the relic. As a wave of cultists approach, Metaurus is resigned to death, but Titus disagrees and turns to face the oncoming horde. Cast: Adewale Akinnuoye-Agbaje as Bladeguard Sergeant Metaurus, Clive Standen as Lieutenant Titus, Ben Plessala as Young Titus, Mark Sheppard as Astropath and Ultramarines Orbital Command, Alexa Kahn as Sorcerer of Tzeentch
6	"Pac-Man: Circle"	Victor Maldonado & Alfredo Torres	Teleplay by : J. T. Petty	Illusorium (from Spain)	December 10, 2024	#ATRI 115
A humanoid creature with no memories awakens in an underground chamber. He is greeted by a floating yellow sphere, Puck, who tells him he is the "Chosen" who will escape the "maze": an alien world of dangerous flora, fauna, and hungry ghosts. At Puck's urging, he takes up a sword and "practices" for his role, killing and eating the other lifeforms he encounters. Looking back, he sees what resembles a downed space craft, while wandering the desolate landscape dotted with weapon emplacements. When the swordsman fails to defeat the final guardian at the exit, Puck "eats" him, gaining the power to defeat the guardian. Realizing Puck is the one who is trapped and needs his body to escape, the swordsman rips Puck out of him and dies. Puck returns to the underground complex and awakens a new "Chosen". Cast: Emily Swallow as Puck, Aleks Le as Swordsman ("The Chosen")
7	"Crossfire: Good Conflict"	Damian Nenow	Philip Gelatt Short Story by: Russ Linton	Platige Image (from Poland)	December 10, 2024	#ATRI 112
In an abandoned city, a group of mercenaries including Layla, Fitz, and Mason have been hired by a civilian, handcuffed to a briefcase, to protect him. The rival Global Risk team, led by Cross and Cabrera, have been tasked to recover the briefcase, identifying it by thermal scope. The mercenaries split into cars, while Global Risk give chase in armored vehicles, boxing the mercenaries in under an overpass. A firefight ensues, and the mercenaries deploy white phosphorus flares to mask their heat signatures, fleeing as the briefcase left behind is revealed to be a decoy. Deducing the most likely escape route, Global Risk pursues Fitz, Mason, and their client to a sea port. Cross guns Mason down, and Fitz abandons the client to exact revenge. Layla finds the client and is confronted by Cabrera, but gives up the briefcase and convinces Fitz to spare Cross, reminding him that they are "not the bad guys". Despite the client's protests, Layla and Fitz fulfill their contract by dropping him at the border, while Cabrera rescues Cross, briefcase in hand. Cast: Ricky Whittle as Cross, Claudia Doumit as Layla, Samuel Roukin as Fitz, Matt Peters as Mahler, Jessica Camacho as Cabrera, Jake Matthews as Mason, Aidan Bristow as Jeffrey, Chris Jai Alex as Unaffiliated Mercenary Driver and Global Risk Operator, Piotr Michael as Global Risk Sniper
8	"Armored Core: Asset Management"	Dave Wilson	Teleplay by : J. T. Petty Short Story by: Peter Watts	Digic Pictures (from Hungary)	December 10, 2024	#ATRI 117
An augmented core pilot stumbles out of a bar, unable to connect with anyone but the AI augment implanted in his brain. The last of his surgically modified kind, he is addicted to the drug-enhanced rush of piloting his core, and suits up as the AI alerts him to an incoming job. He engages two enemy core pilots, noting their remarkable synchronicity, but defeats both mechs before continuing toward the target, a mountain base. He encounters three more incredibly skilled pilots, disabling one with a surprise attack and narrowly destroying the others by collapsing the mountain tunnel behind him. The pilot reaches the base, a facility similar to the lab where he was augmented before the technology was supposedly lost. The AI realizes that the target was the other pilots, who have been augmented, and believes that they were not trying to kill him. The last surviving enemy pilot asks for assistance, but the pilot crushes his skull with his mech, insisting that "no one is like me". Cast: Keanu Reeves as Pilot, Erin Yvette as The Voice, Temuera Morrison as Old Salt, Patrick Schwarzenegger as The Kid, Steve Blum as Dispatch and Mechanic
9	"The Outer Worlds: The Company We Keep"	Bengt-Anton Runsten	Teleplay by : Heather Anne Campbell Short Story by: Siobhan Carroll	Goodbye Kansas Studios (from Sweden)	December 17, 2024	#ATRI 111
Amos is an orphan, sorting garbage on a backwater planet. He happens upon a man putting up posters, who reads him an advertisement seeking test subjects for Auntie Cleo, a pharmaceutical megacorporation. Amos is keen to see Dr. Felicity Karo, a fellow orphan who showed him kindness and has since become the product testing's lead scientist. After working off his debt for "stealing" the poster, the naïve but goodhearted Amos becomes a willing test subject, enduring dangerous trials that eventually lose him all his limbs, replaced with mechanical prosthetics. He finally reunites with Felicity, who is consumed with her goal of becoming the head and face of the company. Abandoned by Felicity, a despondent Amos tries to bring the head of the company recorded evidence of Felicity's plan to release their products to the public untested, but Felicity has already become the new Auntie Cleo. She is seemingly filled with regret, but Amos assures her she is not a bad person and urges her to pursue her ambition, as she takes his evidence and departs the planet. Left behind, Amos remarks that he still "loves Auntie Cleo". Cast: Brenock O'Connor as Amos, Raffey Cassidy as Felicity Karo, Fenella Woolgar as Dr. Langdon, Nicholas A. Newman as Street Advisor, Joanne Henry as Interviewer, Jamie Treacher as Chairman Courtright
10	"Mega Man: Start"	Alex Beaty	Jeff Juhasz	Illusorium (from Spain)	December 17, 2024	#ATRI 107
In Mega City, the robotic creations of Dr. Light have been reprogrammed by Dr. Wily, sending the robots to destroy the city instead of protect it. Rock, Light's humanoid creation, voices his desire to help fight, but the doctor refuses and prepares to send Bomb Man to defeat the others. Bomb Man is hijacked by one of Wily's drones, turning him against Light and Rock. Spotting an ice canister, Rock attaches it to his modified arm and freezes Bomb Man's projectile to his hand, which explodes and destroys the robot. Another drone attempts to infect Rock, but he resists and manages to destroy it. Moved by his genuine intentions and innocence, Light agrees to let Rock fight, upgrading him with new combat armor before teleporting him to Mega City to stop the rampaging robots. Cast: Alkaio Thiele as Rock, Rick Overton as Dr. Light, Bridget Oberlin as News Anchor 1, Brad Abrell as News Anchor 2
11	"Exodus: Odyssey"	Alex Beaty	Tim Miller	Blur Studio (from the United States)	December 17, 2024	TBA
Nik Hanson is a widowed mechanic on the recently colonized frontier world Lidon. Yearning for more, his daughter Mari runs away with traveler Rafael to explore the galaxy for priceless artifacts. Nik is desperate to find his daughter, and Thadie Voss lends him the money for his own voyage, utilizing warp gates that accelerate his ship to near light speed. Due to time dilation, his decade-long journey means several decades have passed for Mari. With help from Rafael's father, Nik continues his search for Mari, Rafael, and their crew, who are fleeing from the alien Celestial empire. In pursuit of his daughter, Nik becomes a servant to the Celestials, and eventually catches up with Mari, who is now older than her father. Nik steals a ship and escapes the Celestials with Mari, who shares a map to more artifacts before finally passing away. Nik returns to Lidon with an invaluable artifact to make the planet more hospitable, leaving it with Kara Voss, Thadie's granddaughter. Revealing the artifact is long-overdue payment, Nik departs to continue his daughter's quest. Cast: Nikko Austin Smith as Mari Hanson, Michael Beach as Nik Hanson, Lily Cowles as Kara Voss, Christopher Sean as Rafael Sabatine, Courtenay Taylor as Thadie Voss, Paul Nakauchi as Luca Sabatine
12	"Spelunky: Tally"	Emily Dean	Teleplay by : Tamsyn Muir Short Story by: Tamsyn Muir	Illusorium (from Spain)	December 17, 2024	TBA
Ana Spelunky is a young adventurer, fleeing from a large mole-like creature. She leaps across a gap over a pit of spikes, but is surprised by another trap, falling to her death. She awakens in a cavern, consoled by an older adventurer, Liz Mutton. Ana resolves to make another run, brushing off her death and resurrection with aplomb. However, after more deaths and resurrections, Ana eventually grows despondent. Liz points out tallies carved on the cave walls, marking her own countless deaths and revivals, and points out the beauty in each new "run" and the memories that remain, inspiring Ana to run again. Cast: Ariana Greenblatt as Ana Spelunky, Merle Dandridge as Liz Mutton
13	"Concord: Tale of the Implacable"	Patrick Osborne	Teleplay by : J. T. Petty and Christian Taylor Short Story by: Rachael K. Jones	Axis Studios (from Scotland)	December 17, 2024	TBA
With space travel presenting such dangers as the Tempest, a deadly galactic storm, the routes controlled by the powerful Guild are exploited by freegunners seeking their fortune. Cassidy, a freegunner captain, is captured by Guild officers to recover a stolen chip implanted in her arm. Her crewmates Kai, Rade, Sladie, and Smokes mount a daring rescue, shooting a zip line into the operating room, but an officer cuts the rope mid-escape, sending Cassidy plummeting. A firefight ensues, and the crew flee with back-up pilot Julius in their ship, the Implacable. Cassidy has survived, and the crew extract the chip, containing a lucrative map of all star lanes. Trapped by Guild ships, Julius betrays the crew but is tricked by Kai, who blasts him out of the airlock. Defiantly transmitting the map to all freegunners, the Implacable escapes into the Tempest; though their survival is uncertain, the crew become legends. Cast: Leah Harvey as Cassidy Taimak, Arthur Lee as Kai, Max Rinehart as Julius, Dimitri Abold as Rade, Rachel Handshaw as Sladie, Laura Bailey as Smokes, Louis Martin as Callosian Officer, Derek Phillips as Lennox, Kerry Gutierrez as Spitz, Darin De Paul as Bartender / Narrator, Clay Savage as Guild Security Officer 1, William Calvert as Guild Security Officer 2
14	"Honor of Kings: The Way of All Things"	Csaba Vicze	Teleplay by : J. T. Petty Short Story by: S. L. Huang	Digic Pictures (from Hungary)	December 17, 2024	TBA
Yi Xing, a young wéiqí master, seeks to challenge the Tiangong, the artificial intelligence controlling his city. Blaming the Tiangong for his parents' deaths and the city's deterioration, Yi hopes to win the Tiangong's power, though all previous challengers have lost and been driven mad. During their game, the Tiangong claims that all things are predetermined and that it has already predicted all future actions and outcomes, as Yi realizes that their game is directly impacting the city around them. After being shown that his parents sacrificed themselves to save him and the city, Yi resolves to sacrifice himself and his opponent together. Instead, the Tiangong resigns, conceding the game and its power. Yi exits the palace with the Tiangong's power to reshape the city. It is then revealed the whole episode was from the perspective of the Tiangong — simultaneously aware of past, present, and future — watching the events unfold before they unfold. It steps through the door to its meeting with Yi, beginning their game. Cast: Aleks Le as Yi Xing, Nelson Lee as Tiangong, Victor Chao as Mad Beggar, Joy Osmanski as Yi Xing's Mother, Lee Shorten as Yi Xing's Father
15	"Playtime: Fulfillment"	Istvan Zorkoczy	Teleplay by : J. T. Petty Short Story by: Rich Larson	Digic Pictures (from Hungary)	December 17, 2024	TBA
O is a delivery cyclist in a heavily gamified world, where everyone is assisted by a hovering Buddibot companion (resembling Asobi from the Astro Bot series). She completes a delivery in the nick of time only to be rewarded with a disappointing virtual skin, before a mysterious stranger sends her to a familiar address with a powerful starfish-like creature, a Conduit. Ignoring Buddibot's protests, she evades Helldivers, a Colossus, and Kratos, as the Conduit helpfully transforms her bike into a variety of futuristic vehicles. She abandons her Buddibot when it tries to stop her mission, but it summons a swarm of fellow bots to hunt her down for breach of contract. O and the Conduit defeat the bots and reach the address, her childhood home and the source of joyful memories of gaming. Outside, her world is now populated by PlayStation properties, including Journey and LittleBigPlanet. The stranger, Johnny, reveals O has passed his test, and she happily agrees to play again. Cast: Heaven Hart as O, Kevin Hart as Buddibot, Jonny Cruz as Johnny, Christopher Judge as Kratos, Andrew Morgado as Helldiver, Fred Tatasciore as Helldiver, Mara Junot as Helldiver

== Production ==
Secret Level was created by Tim Miller, who executive produces at his company Blur Studio. Blur Studio serves as a production company along with Amazon MGM Studios, who saw the success of Love, Death & Robots on Netflix and so commissioned the same studio behind it to make another similarly structured series for them, but with video game franchises. Dave Wilson serves as executive producer and supervising director. According to Miller and Wilson, the series took three years to create from start to finish.

While Secret Level was in the works, Sony was pushing their then upcoming video-game Concord to become a "Star Wars" level multimedia franchise. For that reason, Sony commissioned Blur Studio to produce an episode about Concord depicting, in part, its ongoing fictional narrative and new characters coming to the game. After production for Secret Level was completed, but before its official release, Sony released Concord but pulled the title from the market within two weeks due to unexpectedly low sales and player count. Miller stated that they did not consider removing the Concord episode from the series, despite Sony's market retraction of the game upon which it was based. Miller's decision to keep the episode was, in part, to honor the work that had already been put into it and in respect to some of the other episodes' featured games that had yet to be released, as this was the case with the Pac-Man episode turning out to be a teaser for Bandai Namco's then upcoming game Shadow Labyrinth.

On December 17, 2024, the series was renewed for a second season.

On August 3, 2026, a spinoff series based on the Warhammer 40,000 episode was announced to be in development.

== Promotion ==
A character resembling actor Keanu Reeves who appears in the Armored Core episode gained media attention when the series was revealed. His casting was officially confirmed in October 2024.

The series was announced during Gamescom on August 20, 2024. A trailer was released at the event, which featured segments from each of the episodes.

The pilot who features in the Armored Core episode was the subject of media attention and speculation due to his resemblance to actor Keanu Reeves. Though Prime Video declined to disclose casting information at the time of the announcement, ComicBook.com reported an influx of "nearly nothing but replies about Reeves and his potential appearance in [the series]" under a post by Armored Core's social media account. IGN's Wesley Yin-Poole said that were it not really Reeves, the actor could claim a royalty payment due to the certainty of the character's likeness to his. GamesRadar+'s Ali Jones remarked that while the shot could have been "simply be an ethnically ambiguous man with similar facial hair", they noted the likeness, and doubted that Armored Core would place the image so prominently on their social media account if it were "just some random actor" and not Reeves.

In October 2024 Reeves's casting was officially revealed alongside Arnold Schwarzenegger, Patrick Schwarzenegger, Kevin Hart, Heaven Hart, Gabriel Luna, Ariana Greenblatt, Adewale Akinnuoye-Agbaje, Michael Beach, Emily Swallow, and Claudia Doumit.

A video game that continues the story of the Pac-Man episode, titled Shadow Labyrinth, was released in 2025.

== Release ==
The series premiered its first part worldwide on December 10, 2024. with a second part releasing on December 17, 2024.

== Reception ==
On the review aggregator website Rotten Tomatoes, Secret Level has an approval rating of 69% based on 16 reviews, with an average rating of 6.1/10. The website's critics consensus reads, "Secret Level's melange of video game shorts can't help but feel like a glorified sizzle reel, but these vignettes pack a mean punch in small doses." Metacritic, which uses a weighted average, assigned a score of 53 out of 100 based on nine critics, indicating "mixed or average" reviews. Steven Nguyen Scaife of IGN said the show "struggles to find satisfying stories for a short-form anthology" in a 5/10 review and felt dissatisfied by the selection of the source material. Aramide Tinubu of Variety wrote that "the show acts as poorly written AI summaries of massive tales".

=== Accolades ===
Year	Award	Category	Nominee(s)	Result	Ref.
2025	Annie Awards	Outstanding Achievement for Animated Effects in an Animated Television/Broadcast Production	Kamil Murzyn, Rafał Rumiński, Jarosław Armata, Michał Śledź, and Michał Firek (for "Crossfire: Good Conflict")	Nominated	
2025	Annie Awards	Outstanding Achievement for Animated Effects in an Animated Television/Broadcast Production	Arthur Loiseau, Tom O'Bready, Esteban Genre, Alexandre Lerouge, and Guillaume Grelier Star (for "Dungeons & Dragons: The Queen's Cradle")	Nominated	
2025	Annie Awards	Outstanding Achievement for Animated Effects in an Animated Television/Broadcast Production	Josh Schwartz, Joe Coleman, Michael Huang, Guilherme Casagrandi, and Raul Rodrigues (for "Warhammer 40,000: And They Shall Know No Fear")	Nominated	
2025	Golden Reel Awards	Outstanding Achievement in Sound Editing – Broadcast Animation	Brad North, Matt Yocum, Joseph Fraioli, Nolan McNaughton, Ryan Sullivan, Chris Battaglia, Harry Cohen, Matt Manselle, Matt Telsey and Brian Straub (for "Warhammer 40,000: They Shall Know No Fear")	Won	
2025	Visual Effects Society Awards	Outstanding Animated Character in an Episode, Commercial, Game Cinematic, or Real-Time Project	Zsolt Vida, Péter Krucsai, Ágnes Vona and Enric Nebleza Pañella (for "Armored Core: Asset Management" – Mech Pilot)	Nominated	
2025	Primetime Emmy Awards	Outstanding Sound Editing for an Animated Program	Matt Yocum, Bradley North, Nolan McNaughton, Ryan Sullivan, Joseph Fraioli, Christopher Battaglia, Harry Cohen, Matt Manselle, Matt Telsey, Brian Straub (for "Warhammer 40,000: And They Shall Know No Fear")	Nominated	
