= Exodus: The Archimedes Engine =

2024 novel by Peter F. Hamilton

- Author: Peter F. Hamilton
- Language: English
- Genre: Science fiction; Adventure
- Publisher: Random House Worlds
- Publication date: September 17, 2024
- Pages: 928
- ISBN: 0593357663
- Followed by: Exodus: The Helium Sea

Exodus: The Archimedes Engine is a science fiction novel by British author Peter F. Hamilton, published on September 17, 2024, by Random House Worlds. Set in the distant future, the novel explores humanity's evolution into transhuman species known as Celestials and their interactions with newly arrived humans from ancient arkships in the Centauri Cluster.

The book serves as a narrative set in the universe in the upcoming sci-fi action-adventure role-playing game Exodus, developed by Archetype Entertainment, a division of Wizards of the Coast. An audiobook version, narrated by John Lee, was released simultaneously. The novel has been noted for its intricate world-building and complex character development, characteristic of Hamilton's work.

== Plot ==
Forty thousand years after humanity’s exodus from Earth, the descendants of arkship pioneers inhabit the Centauri Cluster. The Celestials, biologically and technologically advanced humans, dominate through vast interstellar empires. Among these is the Crown Dominion, ruled by five queens under the Imperial Accord. Uranic humans—descendants of later-arriving arkships—are relegated to second-class status, performing menial labor and occupying marginal roles in the societal hierarchy.

Finn Jalgori-Tobu, a Uranic human, survives an attempt on his life when he is thrown from a plane over the Camurdy Mountains on Anoosha. Using neural interfaces, he manipulates livestone, a self-shaping silicate material, to create shelter. Severely injured, he is rescued by settlers Eleanor and Josias Aponi from the arkship Diligent. As the Diligent orbits Anoosha and its crew begins settlement efforts, Finn becomes entangled in the growing Uranic resistance movement.

Kelowan, the Dominion’s capital, is a heavily fortified system with orbital towers, advanced infrastructure, and control over critical economic resources like the helium-rich HeSea. Queen Helena-Chione, of the Royal House of Wynid, navigates mounting challenges to her authority. Her rare pregnancy, involving a single fertilized egg, raises questions about Celestial succession and political stability. Meanwhile, Uranic dissent grows, fueled by Josias Aponi’s fiery rhetoric calling for rebellion against Celestial oppression.

Detective Terence Wilson-Fletcher, stationed in Santa Rosa on Gondiar, investigates subversive activities tied to the Uranic resistance. He uncovers evidence of Celestial interference and manipulations, including sleeper agents embedded within Uranic communities. Terence’s discoveries expose the Dominion’s efforts to suppress dissent, even as rebellion spreads across multiple systems.

Finn and the Diligent’s crew focus their efforts on Dolod, an iron exotic gas giant entering the Kelowan system. Using the Archimedes Engine still attached to Dolod, they devise a plan to disrupt its trajectory, destabilizing the Dominion’s economic balance. The Arcadia’s Moon, a Traveler starship captained by Andino, lends advanced technological support to the resistance effort, although its crew’s motives remain ambiguous.

The operation to manipulate Dolod’s orbit succeeds, forcing the Dominion to allocate significant resources to address the resulting economic upheaval. However, the victory is costly. Celestial retaliation is swift and brutal, exposing internal betrayals as Celestial agents within the Uranic ranks sabotage parts of the rebellion. Despite suffering losses, Finn and his allies retreat to the safety of the Diligent, where they regroup and reassess their strategy.

Queen (now) Helena-Thyra struggles to maintain order as dissent intensifies across the Dominion, and the Uranic rebellion expands into a larger movement. With the Cluster on the brink of widespread conflict, the story concludes with the Uranic resistance poised for a larger-scale confrontation against their Celestial overlords.

== Characters ==
=== Jalgori-Tobu Family ===
- Finbar (Finn) Charles Louis Griffin Jalgori-Tobu - The 25-year-old third son of the Jalgori-Tobu family, and Minsterialis of Hafnir. A key figure in the Uranic resistance, Finn’s resourcefulness and leadership play pivotal roles in challenging Celestial dominance.
- Mary Kathleen Jalgori-Tobu - The 43rd Marchioness of Santa Rosa and Finn’s mother.
- Lamik Louis Kandaol Jalgori-Tobu - Marquis of Russodan and Finn’s father.
- Zelinda Maryann Richelle Jalgori-Tobu - The first daughter and heir to the Marchioness. A pragmatic leader loyal to her family.
- Everett Callan Mathias Jalgori-Tobu - Finn’s older brother.
- Otylia Roasmund Silkie Jalgori-Tobu - Finn’s twin sister and Minsterialis of Serki. Often acts as a counterpoint to Finn’s strategies.

=== Arkship Diligent Crew ===
- Josias Matthew Aponi - The 51-year-old owner of the arkship Diligent. A passionate orator who galvanizes Uranic humans into rebellion but sometimes alienates allies with his extremism.
- Eleanor (Ellie) Faith Aponi - Josias’ 23-year-old granddaughter. A skilled lieutenant aboard the Diligent who aids Finn in his recovery and becomes a trusted ally.
- Dejean - The 59-year-old captain of the Diligent, balancing the survival of the arkship with the political complexities of supporting the rebellion.

=== Imperial Celestials ===
- Helena-Chione - The Now and Forever Queen of Wynid and the reigning Empress of the Crown Dominion. A strategic leader facing both external rebellions and internal political rivalries.
- Lord Gahiji - Chief Archon of Helena-Chione, known for his political acumen.
- Thyra - A Congregant daughter of Helena-Chione, representing the future of Celestial rule.
- Clavissa - Another Congregant daughter of Helena-Chione, embroiled in courtly dynamics.
- Bekket - Thyra’s father, referred to mockingly as "Oneshot".
- Lord Jolav - Consort to Helena-Chione and father to Clavissa.
- Carolien-Amaia - Now and Forever Queen of Verak, a rival within the Dominion’s hierarchy.
- Ramona-Ursule, Inessa-Pierina, and Luus-Marcela - The other queens of the Crown Dominion, each with their own agendas and dominions.
- Olomo - Archon of the Heresy Dominion, a mysterious and influential figure.
- Siskala - Major of the Royal Tiger Guard and a key military figure in Helena-Chione’s court.

=== Humans of the Crown Dominion ===
- Terence Wilson-Fletcher - A 24-year-old detective stationed in Santa Rosa on Gondiar. Tasked with investigating Uranic resistance activities, his work uncovers Celestial infiltration and broader conspiracies.
- Jimena - A 23-year-old forensic technician and Terence’s wife, supporting him through the political turmoil.
- Liliana - A mercenary whose activities intersect with the rebellion.
- Toše and Marcellu - Freelance security specialists involved in covert Celestial operations.
- Medusa - A ruthless assassin working for Celestial interests.
- Elsbeth McQuillan - Commander of the tank Hell Welcomes Careful Drivers, known for her fearless combat strategies.

=== Travelers ===
- Andino - Captain of the Arcadia’s Moon, a Traveler starship. His allegiance to the rebellion remains shadowed by his enigmatic motives.
- Uzoma Enfoe - Captain of the Lestari, another Traveler vessel involved in interstellar activities.

== Reception ==
SFFWorld commended the book as a "complex, action-packed adventure," noting Hamilton’s ability to elevate familiar science fiction settings into a highly engaging narrative. BookFrenzi's Jordan Maison described the novel as a "compelling space opera," acknowledging the dense prose and "disparate elements of pure world-building", which, while initially daunting, Maison found became immersive as the story unfolded.

Not all feedback was positive, however. The San Francisco Book Review's Kevin Winter criticized the pacing, stating that the story "takes a long time for really anything to happen" and suggested it might appeal more to fans familiar with the associated game universe.

Library Journal's Andrea Dyba described the novel as a "Lovecraftian science-fiction epic", while New Scientist's Emily H. Wilson used the novel as a clear example of "hard science fiction".

Game Informer's Matt Miller praises it, offering a "hearty recommendation to fellow sci-fi fans".
