= Shadow Labyrinth =

2025 action-adventure video game

- Steam key art
- Developer: Bandai Namco Studios
- Publisher: Bandai Namco Entertainment
- Director: Tomoaki Fukui
- Producer: Toru Takahashi
- Designers: Shinichi Yusa; Yoshihisa Maeda
- Programmers: Kazunari Usui; Osamu Igarashi
- Writer: Go Tanaka
- Composer: Katsuro Tajima
- Series: Pac-Man
- Engine: Unity
- Platforms: Nintendo Switch; Nintendo Switch 2; PlayStation 5; Windows; Xbox Series X/S
- Release: July 18, 2025
- Genre: Action-adventure
- Mode: Single-player

Shadow Labyrinth is a 2025 action-adventure game developed by Bandai Namco Studios and published by Bandai Namco Entertainment. It is part of the Pac-Man series, reimagining the franchise’s maze-based mechanics within a darker science-fiction setting connected to Bandai Namco’s UGSF fictional timeline, incorporating elements from the Xevious franchise.

The player controls "Swordsman No. 8", who explores interconnected maze-like environments while fighting and consuming enemies, guided by a mysterious companion known as "PUCK". The game blends traditional action-adventure combat with movement mechanics inspired by classic Pac-Man, and was widely described as a Metroidvania following its announcement.

The game was initially promoted through the Secret Level anthology episode "Circle", which serves as an official prequel. Shadow Labyrinth was released on July 18, 2025, for PlayStation 5, Xbox Series X/S, Nintendo Switch, Nintendo Switch 2, and PC via Steam.

== Gameplay ==
Shadow Labyrinth is a 2D action-adventure game featuring many Metroidvania aspects. The player controls Swordsman No. 8, who can perform melee attacks with a sword and charge a variety of "ESP" abilities. Alongside traditional combat, No. 8 can fuse with PUCK to travel along walls and ceilings in sequences reminiscent of the original Pac-Man, controlling speed and launching off surfaces to attack enemies.

They can also fuse into GAIA, a large mechanized form used to fight powerful enemies and bosses. Occasionally, they are transported into enclosed mazes where they have to eat many sleeping ghosts in a similar fashion to Pac-Man Championship Edition 2.

== Plot ==
The game is set within Bandai Namco's UGSF (United Galaxy Space Force) timeline in the year 3333. Thirty-three years earlier, Operation Panzer is disrupted by the Red G-HOST, causing the Panzer GAIA weapon to crash on the planet Xevious. A player from the real world in 2025 is suddenly transported into the game’s universe, awakening in a ruined prison without a mouth or arms. He is guided by a robotic companion named "PUCK", who identifies him as her eighth summoning attempt, while an oloid appears and grants him a prosthetic arm so he can wield a sword, becoming a Swordsman.

As the Swordsman and PUCK travel across the devastated world, it's revealed that Xevious is controlled by a supercomputer named Gamp, which has corrupted both native life and remnants of UGSF technology. PUCK reveals that her original purpose was to destroy Gamp using the dormant Sheyenne GAIA system, but UGSF command instead intends to destroy the planet. The pair encounter a woman named Thebe, who is later revealed to be a lost part of PUCK that was separated and manipulated by Gamp. After confronting several powerful G-HOSTs and cooperating with a lost Bosconian tribe to power the Giant Black Tower, Thebe sacrifices herself so PUCK can regain her true form and use the Sheyenne GAIA to access Gamp’s stronghold.

With the help of the oloid, later revealed to be Thebe's sister Aegina, the Swordsman and PUCK infiltrate Gamp’s core. During the final confrontation, PUCK merges with the Swordsman to return to normal and expel the Panzer GAIA core, which transforms into a massive Pac-Man-like entity that consumes the Gamp replica and self-destructs, ending his control over Xevious. Floating in orbit, Thebe joins Aegina to hunt down the remaining Gamp replicas, and opens a portal for the Swordsman to return to the real world.

== Development ==
Bandai Namco Studios began developing Shadow Labyrinth in 2020. When conceptualizing the game, the team made expanding the audience of the Pac-Man series, a predominantly family-friendly franchise, their primary goal. They decided to do this by creating a darker entry in the series. They revisited the original concepts for the first Pac-Man game, and boiled them down to "the maze concept, the eat concept, and how the table can flip all of a sudden". Using that basis, the team began creating Shadow Labyrinth. The game's development team includes Katsuhiro Harada, producer of the Tekken series, and it was developed using the Unity engine. Per the development team's vision of expanding the appeal of Pac-Man to those who had never played a game in the series, they chose to leave any references to it out of the game's title.

The darker setting and art direction behind Shadow Labyrinth is based on what the development team described as the "Ice Age" concept. In an interview with Rolling Stone, marketing manager Knoah Piasek said that this concept referred to the idea of the game's enemies and bosses being monsters native to the planet it takes place on, rather than basic enemy designs the series was known for, such as ghosts. Piasek added that some enemies have fused with beings from other worlds, allowing them to develop into something "bigger and scarier".

== Marketing and release ==
During the development of Shadow Labyrinth, an episode of the animated anthology television series Secret Level was created to serve as a prequel and to promote the game. The episode, titled "Circle", follows a "Swordsman" as he explores a wasteland while accompanied by "Puck", the latter of whom eventually fuses with the former to become a monstrous version of Pac-Man. The swordsman in the episode is referred to officially as "Swordsman No. 7", while the player character in Shadow Labyrinth is referred to as "Swordsman No. 8". During development of the episode, series creator Tim Miller was shown a sneak peek of the game and commented on its differences from a traditional Pac-Man game.

The game was formally revealed at The Game Awards 2024, and its release date was revealed during a March 2025 Nintendo Direct. It was released on July 18, 2025, for PlayStation 5, Xbox Series X/S, Nintendo Switch, Nintendo Switch 2, and PC via Steam. The game is part of the 45th anniversary celebration of the original Pac-Man game. The game's producer Seigo Aizawa commented that the theme of the 45th anniversary celebration was "making an impact", and stated that releasing a game like Shadow Labyrinth that was the "antithesis" to previous games in the series was their way of following that theme. The game is also not planned to have any post-launch downloadable content, with Aizawa stating that the game will be "completed in one package".

== Reception ==
Reception

Aggregate scores
Aggregator	Score
Metacritic	PS5: 68/100; XSXS: 70/100; PC: 64/100; NS: 73/100; NS2: 65/100
OpenCritic	39% recommend

Review scores
Publication	Score
4Players	PS5: 5.5/10
Famitsu	8/10, 8/10, 8/10, 8/10
Game Informer	NS2: 5/10
Gamekult	PC: 7/10
GameSpot	PC: 5/10
Hardcore Gamer	PC: 4.5/5
HobbyConsolas	NS: 85/100
IGN	PC: 5/10
Nintendo Life	NS2: 7/10
Nintendo World Report	NS2: 8/10
PC Gamer (UK)	PC: 73/100
Push Square	PS5: 6/10
Shacknews	NS2: 8/10
The Games Machine (Italy)	PS5: 7.5/10

Critics generally praised the game's visual style and its unconventional reinterpretation of the Pac-Man franchise, highlighting its atmospheric environments and experimental mechanics. However, reviews were mixed regarding its combat pacing, checkpoint placement, and difficulty balance, with some critics finding the experience uneven despite its creative ambition.

The PlayStation 5, Xbox Series X, PC, Nintendo Switch, and Nintendo Switch 2 versions of Shadow Labyrinth received "mixed or average" reviews, according to the review aggregation website Metacritic. Fellow review aggregator OpenCritic assessed that the game received fair approval, being recommended by 39% of critics. In Japan, four critics from Famitsu gave the game a total score of 32 out of 40, with each critic awarding the game an 8 out of 10.

IGN awarded the game a 5/10, criticizing its checkpoint and combat systems. Shacknews gave the game an 8/10, praising its visual style and the creativity of its concept.
