= Jedi =

Organization in the Star Wars series

The Jedi Order
- Star Wars organization
- The Jedi characters Qui-Gon Jinn and Obi-Wan Kenobi in the 1999 film Star Wars: Episode I – The Phantom Menace

In-universe information
- Type: Monastic; Academic; Meritocratic; Paramilitary
- Founded: 25,000+ BBY
- Fate: Order 66 and destruction of the Coruscant Jedi Temple (19 BBY); Destruction of Luke Skywalker's Jedi Temple (28 ABY)
- Location: Ahch-To (sacred planet); Tython (sacred planet); Ilum (sacred planet); Jedha (sacred planet); Coruscant (headquarters; until 19 BBY); Ossus (headquarters; post-4 ABY – 28 ABY); Legends: Yavin 4 (headquarters; after 4 ABY)
- Leader: Jedi High Council (until 19 BBY); Yoda (Grand Master; pre-32 BBY – 4 ABY); Jocasta Nu (Chief librarian; pre-32 BBY – 19 BBY); Mace Windu (Chief master; pre-32 BBY – 19 BBY); Luke Skywalker (Grand Master; 4 ABY – 34 ABY); Rey (Jedi; 35 ABY – Present)
- Key people: List of key people: Canon; Yoda; Count Dooku (formerly); Mace Windu; Plo Koon; Kit Fisto; Qui-Gon Jinn; Obi-Wan Kenobi; Anakin Skywalker; Ahsoka Tano (formerly); Cal Kestis; Kanan Jarrus; Ezra Bridger; Luke Skywalker; Leia Organa (briefly); Grogu; Ben Solo; Rey Legends; Revan; Bastila Shan; Kreia (formerly); Meetra Surik; Satele Shan; Galen Marek; Mara Jade Skywalker; Jaina Solo; Jacen Solo (formerly); Kyle Katarn
- Affiliations: Galactic Republic; Rebel Alliance; New Republic; Resistance
- Enemies: Sith Order; Confederacy of Independent Systems; Galactic Empire; First Order
- Official language: Galactic Basic

Jedi (/ˈdʒɛdaɪ/), Jedi Knights, or collectively the Jedi Order are fictional characters, and often protagonists, featured in many works within the Star Wars franchise. Working symbiotically alongside the Galactic Republic, the Jedi Order is depicted as a religious, academic, meritocratic, and military-auxiliary (peacekeeping) organization whose origin dates back thousands of years before the events of the Star Wars feature films. The fictional organization has inspired a minor real-world new religious movement and online community: Jediism.

Within the Star Wars galaxy, the Jedi are powerful guardians of order and justice who, through intuition, rigorous training, and intensive self-discipline, are able to wield a supernatural power known as the Force, thus achieving the ability to move objects with the mind, perform incredible feats of strength, perceive events that are distant in time or space, and connect to certain people's thoughts. George Lucas, the creator of Star Wars, explains that the Jedi are "warrior-monks who keep peace in the universe", avoiding the use of violence except as a last resort, with a mission to "use their power to keep the governments of all the planets in line, so that they don't do terrible things". The Jedi have the "moral authority to do that" since they are "the most moral of anybody in the galaxy". Throughout the franchise, Jedi are often recognizable by their robes and tunics in various shades of brown and their use of lightsabers: sword-like weapons with colorful blades made of plasma.

Mostly depicted in the franchise's Old Republic era, the Jedi Order is a monastic organization comprising members of various human and humanoid species, who train meticulously in the martial arts and cooperate intimately with the galaxy-wide Republic government, working towards bringing "peace into the galaxy by being ambassadors and troubleshooters", according to Lucas. Jedi characters investigate certain crimes ranging from high-profile murder to political corruption, act as diplomats between powerful interplanetary groups, protect the highest government officials of the Republic, track down fugitives, and are promoted as leaders in the Republic's army during the Clone Wars. Still, their creed demands that they defend and protect all life and use their power only for knowledge and defense, though the Star Wars franchise often portrays them in battle.

Along with New Age elements, Lucas developed the Jedi creed by adopting certain elements from real Eastern religions—namely Buddhism and potentially Taoism. In that same vein, the Jedi creed focuses on compassion for others, mindfulness, non-attachment, and meditation, which are all characteristics of what Jedi characters call the "light side" of the Force. Furthermore, the Jedi view fear to be the root of suffering: fear leading to anger, anger leading to hate, and hate leading to suffering. The Jedi warn that an excess of these negative emotions can turn practitioners away from the light side of the Force towards the dark side, which embraces passions, aggression, hate, rage, fear, and bitterness as a way of life. The Sith are followers of the dark side and the traditional enemies of the Jedi. While the Sith ultimately seek violent and absolute rule over the galaxy, the Jedi work to protect democracy, harmony, and justice. With the rise of the Sith Lord Darth Sidious and the Galactic Empire, the Jedi Order is outlawed and most of its members killed in the ensuing political purge. Characters make later efforts to revive the organization.

== Etymology ==
The word Jedi has several possible origins. It is possible it was adapted by George Lucas from Japanese 時代劇 (jidaigeki) (meaning 'period drama' motion pictures about samurai), or perhaps inspired by the words "jed" (leader) and "jeddak" (king) in the Barsoom series by Edgar Rice Burroughs, a series that Lucas considered adapting to film. Jedi can originate from the Arabic Al-Jeddi', which means 'master of the mystic-warrior way.' Another potential influence on the word jedi is the Hebrew term ידיד (yadid), which means friend. In his book The Secret History of Star Wars, Michael Kaminski suggests that Lucas may have been influenced by this term when creating the name for his knights. Kaminski notes that Lucas has cited Jewish mysticism as an inspiration for his work, and that he may have been drawn to the idea of his heroes being beloved protectors.

In-universe, according to the Star Wars: Rogue One – The Ultimate Visual Guide, Jedi is derived from Jedha, a planet that was once home to a Jedi temple and was a source of kyber crystals. Kyber crystals are used to power lightsabers and were considered sacred by the Jedi Order.

In his book The Making of Star Wars: The Definitive Story Behind the Original Film, J. W. Rinzler notes that Lucas originally considered using the term "Jedidiah" for his knights, but ultimately settled on "jedi." Rinzler suggests that the word may have been influenced by the term "bodhisattva", which refers to a Buddhist concept of an enlightened being who chooses to remain in the world to help others.

=== Influences ===
George Lucas acknowledged that the Jedi, Sith, and other Force concepts have been inspired by many sources. These include: knighthood, chivalry, paladinism, samurai bushido, Shaolin Monastery, Feudalism, Hinduism, Qigong, Greek philosophy and mythology, Roman history and mythology, Sufism, Confucianism, Shintō, Buddhism and Taoism, and numerous cinematic precursors. The works of philosopher Friedrich Nietzsche and mythologist Joseph Campbell, especially his book The Hero with a Thousand Faces (1949), directly influenced Lucas, and was what drove him to create the 'modern myth' of Star Wars.

Lucas explained that the Jedi are trained, allowed and expected to love people (even their enemies, the Sith), but they are not to form attachments because attachment leads to the dark side of the Force. When one has, gets or wants a person or experience and attaches to them, one becomes afraid to lose them. The fear of loss feeds into greed, wanting to keep things, thus, an attached person is selfish and unable to let go. The fear of loss turns into anger, which will lead to hate, and hate will lead into suffering, mostly on the part of the one who is selfish, because then one will spend their lives being afraid rather than actually living. The light side is focused on compassion and giving; thus it is love, and the opposite of attachment – it is everlasting joy, devoid of fear of loss and the pain of loss. "As long as you love other people and treat them kindly, you won't be afraid".

Lucas, identifying himself as "Buddhist Methodist" or "Methodist Buddhist", stated that his philosophy of non-attachment depicted in his movies was influenced by the fact that he was from San Francisco, the "Zen Buddhism capital of the United States". In 2020, he indicated that the Jedi were "designed to be a Buddhist monk who happened to be very good at fighting".

== Depiction ==
As depicted in the canon, the Jedi study and utilize the Force in order to help and protect those in need. The Jedi members, known as Jedi Knights, respect all life by defending and protecting those who cannot do it for themselves, striving for peaceful and non-combative solutions to any altercations they encounter and fighting only in self-defense and for the defense of those they protect. By training the mind and the body, the Jedi seek to improve themselves by gaining unfettered access to the Force while also seeking to improve those individuals and groups they come in contact with. Like their evil counterparts, the Sith, the main weapon of the Jedi is the lightsaber. However, according to Lucas, "The Force really doesn't have anything to do with the lightsaber. Anybody can have a lightsaber. It's just a weapon like a pistol".

Qui-Gon Jinn gives an insight into the Force in The Phantom Menace when he tells Anakin: "Your focus determines your reality". And later, he explains: "Midi-chlorians are microscopic lifeforms that reside within all of your cells. And we are symbionts with them. Lifeforms living together for mutual advantage. Without the midi-chlorians, life could not exist and we would have no knowledge of the Force. They continually speak to us, telling us the will of The Force. When you learn to quiet your mind you'll hear them speaking to you". In A New Hope, Obi-Wan Kenobi tells Luke Skywalker: "The Force is what gives a Jedi his power. It's an energy field created by all living things. It surrounds us, penetrates us, it binds the galaxy together." ". . . a Jedi can feel the Force flowing through him. It [partially] controls your actions, but it also obeys your commands".

=== The Skywalker Saga ===
==== Prequel trilogy ====
The prequel trilogy depicts the Jedi in their peak of power, headquartered at the Jedi Temple on Coruscant, and dealing with the rising presence of the dark side of the Force and the return of the Sith. In Episode I: The Phantom Menace (1999), Jedi Master Qui-Gon Jinn (Liam Neeson) discovers nine-year-old Anakin Skywalker (Jake Lloyd), whom he believes to be the "Chosen One" of a Jedi prophecy, destined to bring balance to the Force. (Note: Claudia Gray's novel Master & Apprentice explains that this is due in part to his apparently being born of a virgin.) At the end of The Phantom Menace, following Qui-Gon's death at the hands of Darth Maul (Ray Park), Anakin is paired with his apprentice, the young Obi-Wan Kenobi (Ewan McGregor), who promises to train him.

The sequel, Episode II: Attack of the Clones, establishes that the Jedi forswear attachments, being in the same category of possession and striving to cultivate compassion, unconditional love instead. As revealed in the Clone Wars series, the Jedi believed romantic feelings are natural and as such, they did not prohibit them, but for a Jedi Knight, it was essential to make the right choice for the Order and not neglect their Jedi duties in the favor of their beloved, even if that would mean the end of the relationship. This proves problematic when Anakin, now a young adult (Hayden Christensen), falls in love with Padmé Amidala (Natalie Portman). The Clone Wars, first spoken of in the original 1977 film, begin with hundreds of Jedi participating in the battle of Geonosis, before escalating into a galactic war with the Jedi as generals of the newly formed Clone Army.

In Episode III: Revenge of the Sith, Yoda confides to Mace Windu (Samuel L. Jackson) that the prophecy of the Chosen One could have been misread. Sheev Palpatine (Ian McDiarmid), who is revealed to be Darth Sidious, manipulates Anakin's attachment for Padmé and distrust and resentment of the Jedi in order to turn him to the dark side and become his Sith apprentice, Darth Vader. Betraying the Jedi and becoming a Sith, Vader begins helping Sidious to hunt down and exterminate the Jedi during the events of Revenge of the Sith; Obi-Wan Kenobi, Yoda, and Ahsoka Tano are among a handful of Jedi that avoided the initial purge.

As revealed in Star Wars: The Clone Wars, each clone trooper was implanted with a chip that Palpatine would activate with the verbal command Order 66. This resulted in the clones being forcibly brainwashed into viewing their Jedi generals as traitors to the Republic and subsequently summarily executing them. Darth Vader/Anakin Skywalker led the 501st Legion to carry out "Operation Knightfall" against the Jedi Temple, burning and slaughtering all Jedi within, including Temple-Defender Shaak Ti. Sidious deceived the people of the Republic that the Jedi were corrupted warmongers responsible for prolonging the Clone Wars, labeling them criminals with bounties placed on them. Darth Vader continued to hunt and kill nearly every surviving Jedi during the early years of the Empire, in what became known as the Great Jedi Purge.

==== Original trilogy ====
For over a thousand generations, the Jedi Knights were the guardians of peace and justice in the Old Republic. Before the dark times, before the Empire.

— Obi-Wan Kenobi, Star Wars: A New Hope

The Jedi are first introduced in the 1977 motion picture Star Wars as an order of warrior monks who serve as "the guardians of peace and justice in the galaxy" and embrace the mystical Force. Obi-Wan Kenobi (Alec Guinness) explains that Darth Vader (David Prowse/James Earl Jones), a former apprentice and the Jedi's main enemy, helped the Galactic Empire to exterminate the Jedi, and seeks to train Luke Skywalker (Mark Hamill) to be the Jedi Order's last hope. By the end of the film, which depicts the battle of Yavin, Luke is on the path to becoming a Jedi. In the sequel, The Empire Strikes Back, Luke receives Jedi training from the elderly (and only surviving) Jedi Master Yoda (Frank Oz), even as he learns that Vader is, in fact, his father, former Jedi Knight Anakin Skywalker. The third film in the original trilogy, Return of the Jedi, ends with Luke redeeming Vader—who kills Darth Sidious to save him, thus bringing balance to the Force—and helping destroy the Empire, thus fulfilling his destiny as a Jedi.

The two last Jedi Masters die during the events of the films, after which they return as Force spirits to help Luke.

==== Sequel trilogy ====
Now that they're extinct, the Jedi are romanticized, deified. But if you strip away the myth and look at their deeds, the legacy of the Jedi is failure. Hypocrisy, hubris. [...] At the height of their powers, they allowed Darth Sidious to rise, create the Empire, and wipe them out.

— Luke Skywalker, Star Wars: The Last Jedi

In The Force Awakens, the first film in the sequel trilogy, Luke had attempted to rebuild the Jedi Order, but his nephew Ben Solo (Adam Driver) fell to the dark side, lured by the mysterious Snoke (Andy Serkis), and destroyed his temple and other apprentices. Ben is renamed Kylo Ren and destroys all that Luke built. After Kylo's fall and the destruction of the New Jedi Order, Luke goes into a self-imposed exile on Ahch-To, believing himself and the Jedi to negatively influence the galaxy.

In the sequel The Last Jedi, the scavenger Rey (Daisy Ridley) discovers Luke on Ahch-To and convinces him to train her in the ways of the Force. During her training, Luke explains that the past Jedi allowed Darth Sidious to rise to power. She also discovers several ancient Jedi texts hidden away in a tree. Rey learns the truth about Ben's fall to the dark side and believes herself to be his only chance of redemption. Luke decides to stay on Ahch-To and attempts to burn down the tree with the texts, but cannot bring himself to do so. However, Yoda appears as a Force spirit and burns the tree, teaching him that failure is just as important as success, and those masters are defined by those who surpass them. Near the end of the film, Luke confronts Kylo on the planet Crait. It is subsequently revealed that Luke had been projecting himself from Ahch-To; he dies from the effort and becomes one with the Force. Rey is shown to have taken the sacred Jedi texts before she left Ahch-To, to continue her training.

In The Rise of Skywalker, the final film of the sequel trilogy, it is discovered that Darth Sidious created Snoke and has returned from death and has been secretly manipulating events from the Sith world Exegol. In his last attempt to reclaim the galaxy, Sidious unveils the Final Order, a massive fleet of Xyston-class Star Destroyers built by the Sith Eternal. The Emperor offers the Sith fleet to Kylo Ren in exchange for killing the last remaining Jedi, Rey, who is revealed to be his granddaughter. After the death of Kylo's mother, Leia Organa (Carrie Fisher), Kylo returns to the light and reclaims his identity as Ben Solo. At the end of the film, Ben joins Rey as she confronts Sidious. Rey channels the power of the past Jedi to destroy Sidious and the Sith—thus bringing balance back to the Force—before dying herself. Ben sacrifices his life to revive Rey and becomes one with the Force. With peace and justice restored to the galaxy, Rey lives on to start the Jedi Order again.

=== Anthologies and derivative works ===
In a deleted scene from Attack of the Clones, the "Lost Twenty" is the name given to a group of Jedi Masters—numbering twenty in total—who left the Jedi Order throughout its history. The first 12 of this Lost Twenty became "Dark Jedi" who eventually founded the first Sith Empire. In the years preceding the Clone Wars, Jedi Master Dooku left the Jedi Order as a result of differences with his fellow Jedi, becoming the 20th Jedi Master in the history of the Order to do so. To showcase the failures of the Jedi they created statues of the fallen Jedi and placed them in the Jedi Temple Archives.

The animated television series Star Wars: The Clone Wars depicts the battles of the Clone Wars, focusing on the Jedi and clone troopers they lead against the Separatists and its Sith leaders. The series reveals that Anakin trained an apprentice, Ahsoka Tano, between Attack of the Clones and Revenge of the Sith. Later arcs explore the foundations of Order 66 and Darth Sidious' manipulation of the Jedi Order.

The animated television series Star Wars Rebels reveals that Ahsoka and a Jedi named Kanan Jarrus survived the purge; the latter trains a new apprentice, Ezra Bridger. The series also reveals that, following the start of the purge with Order 66, Sidious commissioned the Inquisitorius, a group of former Jedi who had turned to the dark side for various reasons, to aid Darth Vader in hunting down the remaining Jedi.

The Clone Wars spinoff series Star Wars: The Bad Batch follows the titular group of enhanced clones, whose genetic mutations allow them to disobey Order 66 and instead choose to save a younger Kanan after his master is killed by the other clones.

The canon video game Star Wars Jedi: Fallen Order introduces Cal Kestis, a former Padawan hiding from the Empire who accidentally exposes his Force abilities to aid someone, putting him on the Inquisitors' radar. Kestis gets aid from Cere Junda, another Jedi Knight in hiding. In the 2023 sequel, Star Wars Jedi: Survivor, it is revealed that mercenary Bode Akuna was also a survivor of Order 66.

The canon turn-based tactics video game Star Wars Zero Company introduces Tel-Rea Vokoss, a Tognath Padawan investigating the Separatist-aligned cult Infinite Coil. Initially working alone to carry out her late Master Salveren Hadrix's mission to investigate the cult, she eventually works with and later joins the titular mercenary group and their leader Tesh Keff Hawks to work towards the same goal of eliminating the Coil. On the day of the establishment of the Empire, Vokoss and the rest of Zero Company are attacked by the clone Stillwatch Batallion and clone teammate Trick, all under the influence of their inhibitor chips, but were able to repel them, while Trick was sent into a coma due to a pre-existing head injury interfering with his inhibitor chip until it was removed a year later.

In the limited series Obi-Wan Kenobi, the Great Jedi Purge is depicted in a flashback in which Reva Sevander, future Inquisitor called Third Sister, escapes from the clones during the night of Order 66.

=== Members ===
The exact size of the pre-purge Jedi's membership and operations are never specified. However, in the Star Wars Rebels episode "Path of the Jedi", Kanan Jarrus stated:

There were around 10,000 Jedi Knights defending the galaxy. Now, we are few. But in those days, we had small outposts, temples spread throughout the stars. The Empire sought out these temples and destroyed many of them...

Jedi Order master-apprentice relationship

Yoda
Count; Dooku	Mace; Windu
Qui-Gon; Jinn	Depa; Billaba
Younglings
Obi-Wan; Kenobi	Kanan; Jarrus
Anakin; Skywalker	Luke; Skywalker	Ezra; Bridger
Ahsoka; Tano	Leia; Organa
Sabine Wren	Ben Solo (Note: Ben Solo and Rey are a Force dyad.)	Rey
Din Grogu

==== Yoda ====
Yoda was a wise, experienced, and powerful Grand Master of the Jedi of an unknown species and the oldest known prophet in existence (having lived at least 900 years), considered the wisest and most powerful Jedi Master within the Star Wars universe.

==== Mace Windu ====
Mace Windu was a human Jedi Master of the Order and one of the last members of the Order's upper echelons before the fall of the Galactic Republic.

==== Plo Koon ====
Plo Koon was a Kel Dor Jedi Master who served as a General during the Clone Wars and a member of the Jedi Council. Koon led the 442nd Siege Battalion in the Battle of Cato Neimoidia, in which he was shot down by his own troops upon the occurrence of Order 66.

==== Kit Fisto ====
Kit Fisto was a Nautolan Jedi Master, who served as a member of the Jedi Order during the Clone Wars. During the attempted arrest of Chancellor Palpatine, Fisto was killed by the Sith Lord in a duel, leaving Mace Windu to face the Chancellor alone.

==== Count Dooku ====
Count Dooku was a human Jedi Master who was trained by Yoda and mentored Qui-Gon Jinn, who later fell to the dark side and became the Sith Lord Darth Tyranus. He is one of the main antagonists of the prequel trilogy. He led the war against the Jedi and the Republic until his demise aboard General Grievous' ship in the Battle of Coruscant at the hands of Anakin Skywalker.

==== Qui-Gon Jinn ====
Qui-Gon Jinn was a wise human Jedi Master, who was trained by Count Dooku and mentored Obi-Wan Kenobi. Unlike other, more conservative Jedi, he valued living in the moment as the best way to embrace the Force. He was well-known for listening to the Force more than to the Jedi Code, a trait that often put him at odds with the Jedi High Council. He refused to take a seat on the Council, despite him being among the wisest of the Jedi. Jinn was both the Jedi to discover the Sith's return after a millennium, upon being attacked by Darth Maul during a mission to protect Queen Padmé Amidala of Naboo, and the one to find the ability to become a Force spirit after death, though he wasn't capable of having a physical body. Following his death at Darth Maul's hands, Jinn guided both Yoda and Obi-Wan to the ability to become a physical Force spirit after death. Within the Disney+ TV series, Obi-Wan Kenobi, Qui-Gon Jinn appears as a force spirit following Darth Vader's defeat to Obi-Wan Kenobi in a duel. He communes with Kenobi before returning to the Force. In Star Wars: Episode IX - The Rise of Skywalker, he appears as a disembodied voice alongside other past Jedi, empowering Rey to face a rejuvenated Darth Sidious.

==== Obi-Wan Kenobi ====
Obi-Wan Kenobi was a human Jedi Master who trained Anakin Skywalker, at the behest of his deceased master Qui-Gon Jinn, and later Anakin's son Luke Skywalker, making him one of the main characters in the Star Wars franchise. Having fought in the Clone Wars, Obi-Wan proved himself an adept strategist, duelist, and spy, as his leadership style heavily favours subterfuge and misdirection while commanding clone troopers, or wielding the Force. Due to his charisma and persuasion skills, he became known as 'The Negotiator' during the Clone Wars. Obi-Wan best exemplifies the Jedi Code: in spite of Darth Vader's betrayal as well as his master (Qui-Gon Jinn) and later his lover (Satine Kryze) being killed by his nemesis, Darth Maul, he never fell into darkness. As one of the few survivors of Order 66 following the Galactic Republic's transformation into the Galactic Empire, Obi-Wan hid on the desert planet Tatooine, watching over Anakin's son Luke, knowing that he would one day grow to become a Jedi and defeat Vader under the belief that the prophecy of the Chosen One would be fulfilled by the son instead of the father. In Obi-Wan Kenobi, while Obi-Wan hid on Tatooine, Senator Bail Organa's daughter, Leia Organa, was captured upon the request of the Third Sister. Obi-Wan was sent to rescue the ten-year old Princess, and, after retrieving Leia on the planet Daiyu, was forced to duel his former apprentice Darth Vader on the planet Mapuzo, before escaping. Leia Organa, who was imprisoned by the Third Sister on the planet Nur, is saved by Obi-Wan Kenobi a second time before the two escape to the planet Jabiim with aid from the Path. Vader and Kenobi duel once more following Obi-Wan's attempted escape from the planet and Kenobi defeats his former apprentice, allowing Leia to return to her parents. Following this event, Qui-Gon Jinn appears before Kenobi as a force spirit, after years of failed attempts by Obi-Wan to communicate with the deceased Jedi Master. In Star Wars Rebels, Ezra Bridger finds Obi-Wan and attempts to convince him to join the Rebellion, unaware that he was being tracked by Maul in an attempt to draw Kenobi out of hiding and exact revenge on him, while also discovering that he is protecting the young Luke Skywalker. Obi-Wan declines to join, instead staying behind to duel his old nemesis and swiftly emerging the victor. In his dying moments, Maul asks Obi-Wan if the boy he is protecting the Chosen One, to which responds that he is, before Maul declared that he will avenge them both and dying peacefully. Obi-Wan mentored Luke Skywalker in the Jedi arts, before meeting his demise at the hands of his former apprentice aboard the Death Star, though he continued guiding Luke as a Force spirit. In Star Wars: The Force Awakens, Obi-Wan's voice can briefly be heard just after Rey's force vision when she came into contact with Anakin's lightsaber. In Star Wars: Episode IX - The Rise of Skywalker, Obi-Wan appears as a disembodied voice alongside other past Jedi, empowering Rey to face a rejuvenated Darth Sidious.

==== Anakin Skywalker ====
Anakin Skywalker was a human Jedi Knight, one of the main protagonists of the prequel trilogy, and the central antagonist of the original trilogy. He is the Chosen One, being born of the Force. He was apprenticed to Obi-Wan Kenobi and proved to be a very gifted duelist and Force user as well as pilot and mechanic, and despite being appointed to the Jedi High Council at the age of 22, he was not given the title of Jedi Master. He secretly married Padmé Amidala at the onset of the Clone Wars and has two children, Luke Skywalker and Leia Organa. He was eventually seduced to the dark side by the Sith Lord, Darth Sidious, and became the Sith Lord Darth Vader, serving the Galactic Empire. While he was a member of the Jedi Order, he trained a Padawan of his own, Ahsoka Tano during the Clone Wars. Vader was eventually redeemed by his son in Return of the Jedi and gave his own life to save Luke, killing Sidious and bringing balance to the Force, thus fulfilling the prophecy of the Chosen One. Anakin retained his identity after his redemption and death as a Force spirit in his appearance prior to his fall to the dark side. In Star Wars: Ahsoka, his spirit appeared to engage in a final training session with Ahsoka, and later watches over his former Padawan and Sabine Wren, now under Ahsoka's tutelage as her Padawan. In Star Wars: Episode IX - The Rise of Skywalker, Anakin appears as a disembodied voice alongside other past Jedi, empowering Rey to face a rejuvenated Sidious.

==== Ahsoka Tano ====
Ahsoka Tano is a Togruta Jedi Padawan discovered on her homeworld of Shili by Jedi Master Plo Koon. Plo brought her to Coruscant to train as a Jedi. She eventually became the Padawan learner of Anakin Skywalker during the Clone Wars. Among many campaigns, Ahsoka found herself advising rebels on the planet Onderon, including Steela and Saw Gerrera, in their fight against the Confederacy. These rebels would eventually form part of the basis of the Alliance for the Restoration of the Republic, a relationship that would later prove beneficial to her. She was accused of bombing the hangar at the Jedi Temple on Coruscant before Anakin cleared her name. However, the Jedi Council's response during the ordeal soured her faith in the Order, and she left the Order to forge her own path in the galaxy. She briefly returned in the service of the Republic during the final days of the Clone Wars, when she led part of the 501st Clone Legion in the siege of Mandalore to capture the former Sith Lord Maul, who attempted to warn her that Anakin would soon fall to the dark side. Shortly after capturing Maul, Ahsoka was betrayed by her clone troopers as part of Order 66, but she managed to escape alongside Clone Captain Rex (whose control chip she removed). Years later, Ahsoka served the nascent Rebel Alliance as the spymaster and head of its intelligence network, directing operations behind the codename Fulcrum. After the Galactic Civil War, she began searching for Ezra Bridger and Grand Admiral Thrawn, who had gone missing in the Unknown Regions. Ahsoka is one of the few Jedi to survive past the Imperial era and into the New Republic era. After the fall of the Empire, Ahsoka took on Sabine Wren as her apprentice. In Star Wars: Episode IX - The Rise of Skywalker, Ahsoka appears as only a voice alongside other past Jedi, empowering Rey to face a rejuvenated Darth Sidious.

==== Cal Kestis ====
Cal Kestis was a human Jedi Padawan and the main protagonist of Star Wars Jedi: Fallen Order. Trained by Jaro Tapal, Cal witnessed his master's death during Order 66, which he himself barely managed to survive. During the Imperial era, he lived on Bracca, working as a scrapyard rigger and hiding his Force powers. While scrapping a freighter, an accident forced Cal to reveal his Force abilities to save a co-worker, exposing him to the Empire, who dispatched two Inquisitors to hunt him down. On the run, Cal was rescued by Cere Junda, a Jedi Knight also in hiding, and worked with her and other allies to find a Jedi Holocron containing a list of Force-sensitive children, which could be used to rebuild the Jedi Order. Once their mission was completed, Cal decided to destroy the Holocron, believing it to be better for those children to discover their own destinies.

==== Kanan Jarrus ====
Kanan Jarrus (born Caleb Dume) was a human Jedi Padawan who fought for the Rebellion during its formation. First introduced as a main character of the animated television series Star Wars Rebels, Jarrus was known to be the leader of a small rebel cell called the Spectres, operating on the planet Lothal. As a survivor of Order 66, Jarrus was forced to break certain Jedi traditions to avoid being detected by Imperial forces that continued their mission to eliminate any Jedi on sight, such as eschewing traditional Jedi robes or occasionally using a blaster, a weapon typically shunned by Jedi. Although he lost his master Depa Billaba to Order 66 before he could ascend the ranks of the Jedi Order, he was tasked with training the young Force-sensitive Ezra Bridger throughout his eventual service to the larger Rebellion. Ultimately, Jarrus died to save his friends, in particular Hera Syndulla, who would later give birth to her and Jarrus' son, Jacen Syndulla. In Star Wars: Episode IX - The Rise of Skywalker, he appears as a disembodied voice alongside other past Jedi, empowering Rey to face a rejuvenated Darth Sidious.

==== Ezra Bridger ====
Ezra Bridger is a human Jedi Padawan who was born on the planet Lothal on the same day the Galactic Empire was established. He witnessed many injustices of the Imperial occupation of his homeworld for much of his childhood and was separated from his parents from a very early age. He was able to survive alone using street smarts and skills but was discovered by Kanan Jarrus to have potential Force sensitivity after he encounters the Spectres for the first time. After discovering how much of a team player he could be during a rescue operation, they recruited Bridger, who began training him in the ways of the Jedi under Jarrus, himself still a Jedi Padawan. Bridger took a long time learning how to wield a lightsaber and use it to deflect blaster bolts, modifying his first one to fire stun blasts in the interim. He was not well skilled in lightsaber duels against Inquisitors and Darth Vader, but later discovered his unique ability to use the Force to control and command animals, a skill that proved more useful several times during his service in the Rebellion. Bridger later went missing in action during the battle to liberate Lothal from Imperial occupation, where he successfully defeated Grand Admiral Thrawn by sending himself and Thrawn to the extragalactic planet of Peridea, regarded by many as the Empire's best tactician.

==== Luke Skywalker ====
Luke Skywalker was a human Jedi Knight (later Master) and the protagonist of the original trilogy. As the last Padawan of Obi-Wan Kenobi, he became an important figure in the Rebel Alliance's struggle against the Galactic Empire. Luke was heir to a family deeply rooted in the Force, being the twin brother of Rebellion leader Princess Leia Organa of the planet Alderaan, the son of former Queen of Naboo and Republic Senator Padmé Amidala and Jedi turned Sith Lord Darth Vader (Anakin Skywalker), and the maternal uncle of Ben Solo. After redeeming his father from the dark side of the Force, who died killing his master and the last Sith, Darth Sidious, in order to save Luke, he set out to train a new generation of Jedi to rebuild the Order, only to have them wiped out by Supreme Leader Snoke, a puppet created by a revived Sidious, who also turned Ben to the dark side, adopting the Kylo Ren persona. Skywalker then spent the rest of his life in exile on Ahch-To, the original headquarters of the Jedi Order, blaming himself for Ben's turn and the destruction of his Order, until he was found by Rey, the Last Jedi and the secret granddaughter of Sidious, whom he reluctantly trained in the Jedi arts. Shortly after, he gave his life to distract Kylo Ren, now Supreme Leader of the First Order, on the planet Crait via a Force Projection, allowing the Resistance to escape. When Rey learned of her lineage and exiled herself on Ahch-To out of fear of turning to the dark side, Luke appeared before her as a Force spirit and encouraged her to face the Emperor. Along with the spirits of other past Jedi, he then empowered Rey during her final confrontation with Sidious, which marked the definitive defeat of the Sith. Later, he and Leia gave Rey their blessings to adopt the Skywalker surname and continue their family's legacy.

==== Leia Organa ====
Leia Organa was the daughter of Anakin Skywalker and Padmé Amidala, the twin sister of Luke Skywalker, and one of the main characters of the original and sequel trilogies. While Force-sensitive, she didn't become aware of her connection to the Force or her lineage until much later in life, instead focusing on a career as a senator and, secretly, a leader of the Rebel Alliance. As seen in The Rise of Skywalker, Leia began training as a Jedi under her brother shortly after Return of the Jedi, but quit her training when she had a vision that it would result in the death of her yet to be born son. Decades later, while leading the Resistance against the First Order, Leia also briefly mentored Rey in the ways of the Force, despite her limited knowledge about it. Ultimately, Leia gave her life to redeem her son, Ben Solo, who had turned to the dark side, and became one with the Force. Later, she and Luke gave Rey their blessings to adopt the Skywalker surname and continue their family's legacy.

==== Grogu ====
Grogu was a Jedi Initiate of the same species as Yoda who first appeared in The Mandalorian. Raised at the Jedi Temple on Coruscant during the Clone Wars, he was rescued by Jedi Master Kelleran Beq during the Great Jedi Purge and hidden for his own safety. Decades later, the 50-year-old but still toddler Grogu was sought by a remnant of the Galactic Empire due to his connection to the Force, but was found and adopted by the Mandalorian bounty hunter Din Djarin, who sought to reunite him with the Jedi. When Grogu was eventually captured by Moff Gideon's Imperial remnant, Djarin mounted a rescue, which would have been unsuccessful if not for the arrival of Luke Skywalker (whom Grogu had previously contacted through the Force). With Djarin's approval, Luke took Grogu with him so that the child could be trained as a Jedi. Though Grogu briefly trained with Luke, he showed signs of not being fully committed to the Jedi path and wishing to be with Djarin instead, causing Luke to doubt his abilities as a teacher, as seen in The Book of Boba Fett. After speaking with Ahsoka Tano, Luke decided to let Grogu choose his own destiny, and the youngling ultimately returned to Djarin as his Mandalorian foundling.

==== Ben Solo ====
Ben Solo was a human Jedi Padawan and the central antagonist of the sequel trilogy. He was the son of smuggler and Rebel Alliance General Han Solo and Rebellion leader Princess Leia Organa, and the maternal nephew of Jedi Master Luke Skywalker, having been born shortly after the Galactic Empire's defeat. As part of his uncle's new generation of Jedi, Ben trained under him, but was eventually seduced to the dark side by Supreme Leader Snoke, a puppet created by a revived Darth Sidious, the last Sith, and sought to become a Sith Lord, as powerful as his late maternal grandfather, Darth Vader (Anakin Skywalker). Following the destruction of Luke's New Jedi Order, Ben adopted the Kylo Ren persona and became a warlord of the First Order, as well as the leader of the Knights of Ren, an organization of fellow Force-wielders. He later killed his father when he unsuccessfully tried to redeem him and formed a unique connection with Rey, the last Jedi and Sidious' secret granddaughter, called a Force dyad. After killing Snoke, Kylo took over as Supreme Leader of the First Order, until ultimately being redeemed by his mother and Rey, and helping Rey face Sidious, giving his own life to save hers.

==== Rey ====
Rey was a human Jedi Padawan and the protagonist of the sequel trilogy. She is the paternal granddaughter of Sheev Palpatine (Darth Sidious), the last surviving Sith Lord, and was born in the years following the Galactic Empire's defeat. Abandoned on the desert planet of Jakku at a young age by her parents in order to keep her safe, she became involved in the conflict between the Resistance and the First Order, and formed a unique connection with Kylo Ren, called a Force dyad. She was briefly trained by Luke Skywalker and, following his death, continued her Jedi training under the guidance of his sister and Resistance leader Leia Organa, as well as the ancient Jedi texts. Rey eventually learned of her lineage and, with the help of a redeemed Kylo Ren and the spirits of past Jedi, faced a revived Sidious, finally killing him and ending the Sith once and for all, thus bringing balance back to the Force.

=== Force-sensitive organizations ===
Not every "dark side"-user is a Sith; nor is every "light side"-user is a Jedi. Within the Star Wars Expanded Universe, people of all species have demonstrated varying "force-sensitive" powers and abilities. These "force-wielders" are often depicted with little to no formal Jedi training in the Force, originating from primitive planets.

==== The Sith Organization ====
===== Dark side adept =====
A dark side adept is someone with the power to use the dark side of the Force outside of the traditions of the Jedi or the Sith. They were often steeped in the lore of the dark side and opposed to those who used the light side, such as Jedi. While all Sith were technically dark side adepts, non-Sith individuals such as Asajj Ventress, Kylo Ren, and the Grand Inquisitor were also considered dark side adepts. Dark side adepts were referenced in passing in James Luceno's canon novel Tarkin.

==== Force-wielders without affiliation ====
The Bendu, introduced in the Star Wars Rebels Season 3 episode "Steps into Shadow", is a Force-sensitive individual who resided on the remote planet of Atollon and represents the "center" of the Force, between the light side and the dark side. When he is first met by Kanan Jarrus, he states that "Jedi and Sith wield the Ashla and Bogan. The light and the dark. I'm the one in the middle. The Bendu...". He is depicted as one who seeks balance, and has been likened to Tom Bombadil of The Lord of the Rings. The term "Bendu" first appeared in the original script for Star Wars as the name of the Jedi Knights, the "Jedi-Bendu". A term used to describe Force-sensitives that are not part of the Jedi nor Sith is "Force-sensitive outcast", with three such cases being Ahsoka Tano, who left the Jedi Order but continued adhering to the light side by helping those in need and operated as a spymaster for the early and formal rebellions against the Empire, Maul, who was expelled from the Sith Order and the Rule of Two by Darth Sidious, but continued following the dark side and formed the criminal syndicates the Shadow Collective and Crimson Dawn, and Asajj Ventress, who after being rejected as a Sith apprentice, took up bounty hunting, occasionally aiding the Jedi and the Republic before finally rejecting the dark side and living a quiet life as a security guard during the Imperial era.

== Description ==
=== The Jedi Code ===
The Jedi Code was a set of rules that governed the behavior of the Jedi Order. It taught its followers to not give in to feelings of anger toward other lifeforms, which would help them resist fear and prevent them from falling to the dark side of the Force.

The Code:

There is no emotion, there is peace.
There is no ignorance, there is knowledge.
There is no passion, there is serenity.
There is no chaos, there is harmony.
There is no death, there is the Force.

— The Jedi Code

=== The Four Councils ===
The Four Branches of the Jedi Council are fictional institutions from the Star Wars universe. They serve the Jedi Order as an organized administrative body that provides the necessary auxiliary and support services that sustain and governed the Order's academies, temples, interests and organizations.

==== Jedi High Council ====
The Jedi High Council is the main ecclesiastical leadership of the Jedi Order with both legislative and executive powers. The Jedi High Council is made up of some of the strongest, wisest and most experienced members of the Jedi Order. They are elected to lead the Jedi. The Jedi High Council has twelve members at any given time: five members who serve for life, four members who serve long-term, and three limited-term members. Sifo-Dyas had a seat on the council until his extremist views on a war that he foresaw caused his removal. Other older members include Jor Aerith, Tera Sinuba, and Yula Braylon.

In Jedi: Fallen Order - Dark Temple (which is set an unknown amount of time before Star Wars: Episode I – The Phantom Menace), the Jedi Council includes Yoda, Mace Windu, Eeth Koth, Yarael Poof, Poli Dapatian, and Jocasta Nu. In Master & Apprentice, set seven years before The Phantom Menace, the council includes Yoda, Mace Windu, Depa Billaba, Poli Dapatian (who is in the process of retiring), Eeth Koth, and Saesee Tiin.

In the final days before the end of the Clone Wars and the extermination of the Jedi Order, the Council consisted of the following members:

- Yoda
- Mace Windu
- Plo Koon
- Stass Allie
- Shaak Ti
- Kit Fisto
- Saesee Tiin
- Coleman Trebor
- Anakin Skywalker
- Agen Kolar
- Obi-Wan Kenobi
- Ki-Adi-Mundi

==== Council of First Knowledge ====
The Council of First Knowledge administered the Temple-based academy and its curriculum and funded scholars' scientific research. To this end, the Council guarded and maintained the Temple Archives and its Holocron vaults, as well as the "Shadow program" at the Jedi Temple: Jedi Sentinels tasked with hunting down Sith artifacts.

==== Council of Reconciliation ====
The Council of Reconciliation dealt with the Galactic Senate and the Republic Diplomatic Corps in order to help bring diplomatic resolutions to conflicts and end political standoffs. The "first face" of the Republic presented to worlds interested in joining the Republic, this council would dispatch Jedi diplomats and ambassadors to moderate debate and hammer out treaties

==== Council of Reassignment ====
The Council of Reassignment administered the Jedi Service Corps and each of its branch councils. Organizing work for those Initiates who failed out of the academy and Knights with special talents, the Reassignment Council oversaw this branch's missions and assignments.

=== Ranks of authority and educational progress ===
Every Jedi, regardless of species or homeworld, is trained for their career at Jedi Academy. Entrance is determined by rigorous examination and psychological tests. When Jedi Sentinels, known as "Seekers", discover or test a suitable "force-sensitive" candidate, they are taken to the Jedi Academy at the age of 5 (for humans; varies depending on the species and arbitrary calendar years) with the parent's permission. Jedi scholarship educations are considered prestigious, as most parents are portrayed as either happy or proud of the opportunity presented to their child, who could never afford an education. However, most parents also are generally sad since they know they are unlikely to see their child again before adulthood.

Jedi members could technically leave the Order whenever they want, but most of these children were essentially orphaned. Because they were removed from their family at such a young age, they were detached, being indoctrinated into the Jedi way of life through a structured system. The Jedi Archives holds records of every known force sensitive child; Yoda destroyed these records during the Jedi Purge, before Darth Vader assaulted the Jedi Temple, to protect these children from being exploited by the Sith.

Members of the Order progress through four educational stages, at times referred to as levels:

==== Initiate ====
Initiation is the first part of Jedi training; they are mentored by Jedi Masters in rudimentary control over the Force and basic self-defense techniques.

Most Initiates were typically Younglings (a child Jedi-in-training), receiving an early and first-class education. The first ten years of a youngling's training demands segregation from outside distractions and is deliberately designed to reinforce detachment from earthly emotions, including loyalty or love for their parents. Initiates are taught to abandon ego, and that discipline, selflessness and truthfulness will lead to harmony with The Force. This is why Yoda initially denied both Anakin and Luke Skywalker for being "too old for training".

Abandon ego. Release all your earthly attachments; let go of all you've grown to love... Surrender yourself.

— Yoda, in Attack of the Clones

Younglings were portrayed training under Jedi Master Yoda in a scene on Attack of the Clones and hiding during the assault on the Jedi Temple in Revenge of the Sith before being murdered off-screen by Anakin Skywalker (as the then-newly christened Darth Vader).

The "Young Jedi" story arc and the episode "Path of the Jedi" explored the Jedi tradition called "The Gathering," where initiates traveled to the "Crystal Caves" of Ilum to harvest kyber crystals, which they would use to build their first lightsabers. Crystals were attuned to individual Jedi and lacked color. The Force spoke to each of the younglings through their crystals. To find their crystal, each initiate had to learn a lesson: courage, hope, patience, trust, confidence, and selflessness.

==== Padawan ====
An Initiate who successfully completes "fundamental training" is given a second-class education and then undergoes Padawan training under the tutelage of a Mentor (usually a Jedi Knight or Jedi Master). They are also called "Apprentices" and "Padawan learners". In the Old Republic, Padawans usually wore a hair braid or a bead string (for species without hair) on the right side of their head which was severed with a lightsaber by the Jedi Grand Master upon attaining knighthood. They also served as Commanders in the Clone Wars.

==== Knight ====
Disciplined and experienced, Jedi Knights become so only when they have completed "the trials" (final tests), they officially graduate, being eligible for specialized advance courses, and may continue to pursue a third-class education (see below) to obtain the equivalent of a habilitation or post-doctoral degree. As the most common and numerous rank, Knights are youthful journeyman eager to travel the galaxy, obtain new experiences and serve the Republic; thus Knights are frequently "the face" of the Order, with all Jedi erroneously referred to by the general public as Knights, and the rank is interchangeably referred to as "Jedi", "Jedi Knight" and "Master Jedi" (although the latter are honorifics used only by Younglings and Padawans when addressing Jedi Knights or above).

The five tests are usually known as Trial of Skill, the Trial of Courage, the Trial of the Flesh, the Trial of Spirit, and the Trial of Insight (or Knowledge). In Return of the Jedi, Master Yoda gives his apprentice, Luke Skywalker, the trial of confronting Darth Vader for a second time so he might become a full-fledged Knight. Occasionally, performing an extraordinary (usually heroic) act can earn a Padawan learner Jedi status, such as when Obi-Wan Kenobi defeats the Sith Lord, Darth Maul. By the time of the Skywalker Saga films, distinct "battle classes" were not necessary as the Republic had not seen war in over a thousand years, and the title of Knight was simply a rank once again.

==== Master ====
The title of Jedi Master is bestowed upon the most powerful members of the Jedi Order. Masters are regarded as among the most accomplished and recognized polymaths in the Star Wars galaxy; generally, they have resigned from wanderlust ways of knighthood and instead apply their acquired years of wisdom and experience to meditative, administrative and educational pursuits. Upon completion of vocational or postgraduate education, a Jedi Knight becomes a Jedi Master after successfully training several Padawan learners to Knight status, such as when Obi-Wan Kenobi became a Jedi Master after he successfully trained Anakin Skywalker to the point where he was able to complete the trials and become a Jedi Knight. Though this is the most common manner, there are other ways of attaining the rank. Some Jedi masters include Obi-Wan Kenobi, Qui-Gon Jinn, and Yoda.

=== Specializations and occupations ===
Various careers, occupations, ranks and titles were available to all Jedi. Upon a Padawan's ascension to "Knighthood-status", a Jedi pursued higher education or vocational education and training in a field of expertise; choose a career based on preference, personal talents and skills. Before the Great Jedi Purge, numerous divisions existed across the whole of the order, but most personnel are represented within the three order divisions: the Order of the Guardian, the Order of the Consular, or Order of the Sentinel. In addition to their specialization, in times of war, the High Council could demand that the members of the Order assume military ranks in order to defend the Republic.

==== Hierarchy ====
- Grand Master of the Jedi Order: The Grand Master is the oldest, the most experienced, the most accomplished and the best trained of all Jedi. A Grand Master is voted unanimously by the Jedi High Council. The Grand Master serves as the organization's figurehead in charge of ceremonial duties and dictates the organization's general policies while providing direction and guidance to the entire Jedi Order. Yoda and Luke Skywalker were Jedi Grandmasters.
- Chief Librarian of the Jedi Archives: The overseer of the Jedi Archives, Holocron Vault, Librarian's Assembly and the Educational Corps. Second only to the Grand Master in administrative importance, the Chief Librarian worked closely with the Council of First Knowledge. Around the time of the Clone Wars, the Chief Librarian was the elderly Jedi Master Jocasta Nu.
- Chief Master of the Jedi High Council (or 'Master of the Order'): The Chief Master of the High Council is elected by the Jedi High Council, which effectively acts as chairman, Chief of staff and chief operating officer. Its chief responsibilities include; presiding over High Council meetings of the assembled group, conducting Jedi businesses in an orderly fashion, managing the executive particulars of the day-to-day administration of the Jedi Order, acting as representative or spokesperson to the Galactic Senate, and serving as the Grand Master's junior partner. Jedi Master Mace Windu filled this position at the time of the Clone Wars.
- Jedi General: A title given to those given commanding roles in the Grand Army of the Republic during the Clone Wars.
- Jedi Commander: This title was given to Jedi Padawans under the leadership of Jedi Knights and Jedi Masters with their roles as Jedi Generals in the Grand Army of the Republic during the Clone Wars.

==== Divisions ====
- Jedi Guardian: Jedi Guardians are the vigilant warrior-class, being the original, most common and numerous among the Jedi, easily identified by their blue lightsabers; they focused all aspects of combat and military prowess as an extension of their being, and trained on combining and perfecting their athletic, aviation and martial art skills with mastery of the Force. The Force skills studied by the Guardians were typically those used for quickly disabling an opponent and aiding in agility and stamina. Many were stationed within Republic planetary or sectoral government's security agencies where they worked as special peacekeepers and law enforcement agents, helping to quell riots and capture terrorists. The highest-ranking Jedi Guardians were stationed at the Jedi academies as instructors tasked with passing down their experience to the young students of the Order. Those Jedi who mastered lightsaber-combat techniques (such as Mace Windu) were dubbed Weapon Masters and were among the greatest warriors of the Order.
- Jedi Consular: Jedi Consulars are the contemplative scholar-class, being easily identified by their green lightsabers; they were deep thinkers and philosophers devoted to the mental aspects of the force, studied the greater inner workings of the force behind the scenes, focused on further mastery of the Force, the sharpening of mental faculties, and wielded a lightsaber only for self-defense. Overseen by the Council of Reconciliation, Jedi Consulars were often called upon to act as impartial advisers, diplomats, and arbiters. Most Consulars specialized as historians, archivists, librarians, archaeologists, geologists, biologists, mathematicians, and astronomers; they contributed to the growth and preservation of the Jedi Archives as "Lore Keepers" directed by the Librarian's Assembly. Some Consulars worked closely with the Republic bureaucrats to assist in greeting unaligned governments and helping them join the Republic and given the authority to hammer out a compromise or treaty during tense negotiations, backed by the full support of the Senate and Jedi Order. Some Consulars joined the Circle of Jedi Healers (headquartered out of the Coruscant Temple's Halls of Healing) and focused on the medical and humanitarian aspects of the Force, manipulating the Living Force to perform the art of healing. Those Jedi specifically predisposed to receive visions through the Force were known as "Seers", maintaining and updating the Order's holocrons; the most perceptive of these Jedi (such as Yoda) were known as Prophets and foretold the future of the galaxy.
- Jedi Sentinel: Jedi Sentinels are the pragmatic tech-class, being easily identified by their yellow lightsabers; they blended multiple schools of teaching, amplified them with a series of non-force skills, and focused on diverse inter-disciplinary talents that were not often associated with the Jedi. Sentinels applied their Force abilities as engineers, technicians, intelligence and security experts. Interestingly they stayed away from the Jedi Temple preferring to conduct their affairs within communities throughout the galaxy. Most Sentinels tended to take a middle road approach to problems, being stationed at numerous locations for decades, to serve as liaison officers between the system or sector and the Republic. The most loyal Sentinel join the anonymous "Jedi Temple Guard" charged with guarding the Jedi Temple; such dedication demanded no emotional relationship or identity. Some Sentinels aided police as detectives through the use of the Force. Since Republic law required all newborns to undergo "Force-sensitivity" testing, Sentinels who worked as members of the Acquisition Division of the Order routinely tracked down and identified Force-sensitive children to assess whether they met the qualifications to receive training in the Jedi Order. The most elite Sentinels became "Shadows" or "Watchmen": the Jedi-secret police who worked under the supervision of the First Knowledge Council to destroy all remnants of the Sith.

=== Resources and technology ===
In the Star Wars universe, the Jedi are usually portrayed wearing simple robes and carrying specialized field gear for their missions. Their philosophical lifestyles mirror those of real-world religious vows and evangelical counsels, as their personal possessions are provided exclusively by the Jedi Order, and are only meant to allow self-sufficiency.

==== Weapons ====
The most notable instrument wielded by a Jedi is the lightsaber. Both Jedi and Sith use lightsabers, though the former regard them as a tool, the latter, a weapon. The Jedi's lightsabers emit cool colors, usually blue or green blades (sometimes yellow, or purple, as seen in the case of Mace Windu), while the Sith emit warm colors (red). Lightsabers can be of many different colors depending on the crystal fixture and reflective of the wielders' psychological profile. Most Jedi use naturally formed crystals, frequently ranging between blue, green and yellow; whereas Sith tend to use corrupted or synthetic crystals, which are usually red in color. Although rare, spear-like, whip-like and multi-bladed lightsabers can exist, especially among Sith such as Darth Maul's double-bladed lightsaber, the Inquisitors' double-bladed/rotating ones, or Kylo Ren's crossguard-bladed one (due to a cracked kyber crystal).

==== Vehicles ====
Eta-2 Actis Jedi interceptors first appeared in Revenge of the Sith. Delta-7 Aethersprite Jedi starfighters appear in Star Wars: Episode II – Attack of the Clones and Star Wars: Episode III – Revenge of the Sith, while the Delta-7B variant appears in The Clone Wars film. In Attack of the Clones, Obi-Wan Kenobi travels via Jedi starfighter to Kamino to investigate the attempted assassination of Padmé Amidala; he also flies a Jedi starfighter to Geonosis in an attempt to track down the bounty hunter Jango Fett. Lacking a hyperdrive, the starfighter relies on an external sled to propel it through hyperspace. Kenobi and Anakin Skywalker (Hayden Christensen) fly updated Jedi starfighters (called Jedi interceptors) in the opening sequence of Revenge of the Sith. Later, Plo Koon (Matt Sloan) flies a Revenge of the Sith-era starfighter when he is shot down by clone troopers carrying out Darth Sidious' (Ian McDiarmid) Order 66.

The Jedi starfighter's triangular shape in Attack of the Clones stems from the shape of Imperial Star Destroyers in the original Star Wars trilogy. Industrial Light & Magic designer Doug Chiang identified the Jedi starfighter as one of the first designs that bridges the aesthetic between the prequel and original trilogies. Chiang noted that viewers' familiarity with the Star Destroyer's appearance and Imperial affiliation gives added symbolism to the Jedi craft's appearance and foreshadows the Empire's rise to power. The starfighter seen in Revenge of the Sith is a cross between the previous film's vessel and the Empire's TIE fighters from the original trilogy. Hasbro's expanding wings in the Attack of the Clones Jedi starfighter toy inspired the opening wings in the Revenge of the Sith vessel. The starfighter in the Revenge of the Sith is called a Jedi interceptor.

==== Jedi Archives ====
The Jedi Archives, known as The Great Library of Ossus or The Great Library of the Jedi, contained the galaxy's most priceless and ancient of texts sacred to Jedi scholars and archaeologists. Among these were Sith artifacts, considered by the Jedi Order to be the most dangerous artifacts in the galaxy, that were accessible only to those able to control the Dark Side of the Force.

The Jedi archives of the Jedi Temple in the movie Star Wars: Episode II – Attack of the Clones bear a startling resemblance to the Long Room of the Trinity College Library in Dublin. This resemblance resulted in controversy as permission had not been sought to use the building's likeness in the film. However, Lucasfilm denied that the Long Room was the basis for the Jedi archives, and officials from Trinity College Library decided not to take any legal action.

==== Jedi Academy ====
The Jedi academies were established to train Force-sensitive beings accepted into the Jedi Order in the ways of the Force. Overseen by the Council of First Knowledge, each academy was governed by an advisory Council appointed by their superiors on Coruscant. Mainstreaming the majority of teachings at the Temple, certain practices were permitted to vary from world to world. However, at all sanctioned academies, a group of Jedi Masters would instruct Initiates to the Order in the ways of the Force. The size of the school varied from world to world; the smallest consisted of a single clan of younglings, and the largest was the main academy housed within the Jedi Temple of Coruscant. Most academies had been established during the Old Sith Wars and were located in the Galactic Rim. Some were located on or near Force-wellsprings or places significant to the Order like crystal caves or nexuses of dark side energies that needed constant monitoring.

In addition to the traditional academies established by the Order, the Exploration Corps maintained several spacefaring mobile academies such as the Chu'unthor so that roaming the galaxy and exploring new worlds could be achieved while still teaching traditional doctrine.

By the fall of the Galactic Republic in 19 BBY, many of the ancient academies had been shut down for decades, with the Council of First Knowledge preferring the central teachings of the Coruscant Temple. After the dissolution of the Order during the Great Jedi Purge, all orthodox Temples and academies were routed and burned in order to prevent any more Jedi from learning the secrets of the Force. However, the Galactic Empire's chokehold on Force-education did not last and the Order was reformed following the conclusion of the Galactic Civil War. After Grand Master Luke Skywalker's New Order became a single class of twelve students including his nephew Ben Solo, it was reduced to only himself when his nephew turned to the dark side and became Kylo Ren.

==== Jedi Temple ====
In the prequel trilogy, the primary Jedi Temple is located on the Republic's capital planet of Coruscant. As the chief administrative headquarters, the Temple served the Order in three capacities: a monastery and library for the Jedi seeking enlightenment and to reflect on the will of the Force; an academy and training center for Jedi younglings and Padawans who endeavored to join the ranks of the Jedi Knights; and government, in which the Masters of the Jedi High Council guided the Order's direction. It was originally built atop an old "dark-side nexus" shrine during the birth of the Republic, so as to be symbolic to the Coruscant people that the tyrannical rule of the Sith was over.

In Revenge of the Sith, the Jedi Temple is attacked by clone troopers of the 501st Legion, led by the newly christened Darth Vader, who butchered the Jedi within and set the Temple alight. After the fall of the Jedi Order and the Galactic Republic, the Temple became the Palace of the Emperor and a location for his dark side artifacts. It would serve as Sidious' residence for over two decades until his death at the battle of Endor. The Temple is visible in the celebrations on Coruscant at the end of Return of the Jedi. After the destruction of the Sith, Luke Skywalker—the last of the Jedi—recovered fragments of a Force-sensitive tree that was once located at the heart of the Jedi Temple.

Architects' Journal rated the temple third on its top-ten architecture of Star Wars list behind the second Death Star and Jabba the Hutt's palace on Tatooine, and ahead of Coruscant, the capital city of the Old Republic. The temple is described in the article as adapting "the robust typology of Mayan temples, with durasteel cladding specified for the external stone walls for improved defensive strength" and said to be a ziggurat that "is built above a Force-nexus and has ample room for training facilities, accommodation and the Jedi Archive". The temple has five towers, the tallest being Tranquility Spire, that are stylistically similar to the minarets surrounding the Hagia Sophia in Istanbul. Star Wars Insider listed it as the one hundredth greatest thing about Star Wars in its one hundredth issue special.

== Legends depiction of the Jedi ==
With the 2012 acquisition of Lucasfilm by The Walt Disney Company, most of the licensed Star Wars novels and comics produced since the originating 1977 film Star Wars were rebranded as Star Wars Legends and declared non-canon to the franchise in April 2014.

In novels and reference books now considered Legends, the interpretation of the Jedi teaching on not forming attachments was alternating between being in line with George Lucas' vision and using "attachment" in the sense of affection, fondness and loving commitment, stating that the Jedi Code prohibited these emotional bonds. Furthermore, the Jedi were depicted as a quasi-militaristic organization with strict political alignment to the Galactic Republic.

=== Je'daii ===
Precursors to modern Jedi, the Je'daii Order studied both light and dark sides of the mysterious Force, striving to balance them equally. The preview Dawn of the Jedi issue dates the Je'daii origins to 36,453 years BBY. Before lightsabers and hyperspace travel, the Je'daii journeyed across the planet Tython, training at the Order's nine temples and mastering the lessons of each.

=== The New Jedi Order ===
In novels set after the events of the film series, Luke Skywalker re-established the Jedi High Council as part of his New Jedi Order. The most notable difference between the format of the new council and the old is that only half of the council are made up of Jedi, while the other half consisted of politicians. Following the war with the Yuuzhan Vong, the Jedi withdrew their support from any one political entity and relocated to Ossus, where Luke had a full Jedi Council re-established.

The New Jedi Order was the restored and reformed Jedi organization, in the wake of the Great Jedi Purge and the subsequent fall of the Galactic Empire. The Jedi Knights, reduced in number to only a handful, were slowly restored, primarily under the leadership of Grandmaster Luke Skywalker. Skywalker abolished the traditional Master/Padawan system. He believed all Jedi should be both teachers and students; that they should both learn from and mentor each other, and not just from one Master.

Within the Expanded Universe, The New Jedi Order indicates that the Jedi Temple on Coruscant is no longer standing but it is rebuilt as a gift to Jedi for their services and achievements during the Yuuzhan Vong invasion. The new temple is in the form of a massive pyramid made from stone and transparisteel that is designed to fit into the new look of Coruscant, though internally it is identical to the design seen in Revenge of the Sith.

== Cultural impact and critical response ==
The United States Army had a group of officers in the early 1980s who promoted maneuver warfare tactics, and who were derisively referred to as Jedi by more conventional officers who were satisfied with attrition warfare tactics and methods.

=== Analysis ===
In Star Wars and Philosophy, William Stephens compares the Jedi to Stoicism:

To recap, the virtues the Jedi shares with the Stoic sage are patience, timeliness, deep commitment, seriousness (as opposed to frivolity), calmness (as opposed to anger or euphoria), peacefulness (as opposed to aggression), caution (as opposed to recklessness), benevolence (as opposed to hatred), joy (as opposed to sullenness), passivity (as opposed to agitation), and wisdom. Given all these virtues, Yoda certainly resembles what the ancient Stoics described as the sage—the ideal person who has perfected his reason and achieved complete wisdom.

Functionally, the Jedi order resembles a Praetorian Guard.

=== Media ===
Jedi have made their way into certain areas of pop culture, such as "Weird Al" Yankovic's song "The Saga Begins", a parody of "American Pie". In the film The Men Who Stare at Goats (2009), a reporter follows a former soldier who claimed to be a "Jedi warrior", a nickname for psychic spies in the US military.

=== Religion ===
One of the enduring influences the Star Wars saga has had in popular culture is the idea of the fictional Jedi values being interpreted as a modern philosophical path or religion, spawning various movements such as the Jediism (religious) and the Jedi census phenomenon.
