= Temple Hill (novel) =

2001 novel

- Cover of the first edition
- Author: Drew Karpyshyn
- Language: English
- Genre: Fantasy
- Published: 2001
- Publication place: United States
- Media type: Print (paperback)
- Pages: 978-0-7869-1871-3
- Preceded by: The City of Ravens

Temple Hill is a fantasy novel by Drew Karpyshyn, set in the world of the Forgotten Realms, and based on the Dungeons & Dragons role-playing game. It is the second novel in "The Cities" series. It was published in paperback in September 2001.

== Plot summary ==
Lhasha Moonsliver must battle the thieves' guild, the Cult of the Dragon, and other foes.
