= Drew Karpyshyn =

Canadian novelist and video game designer

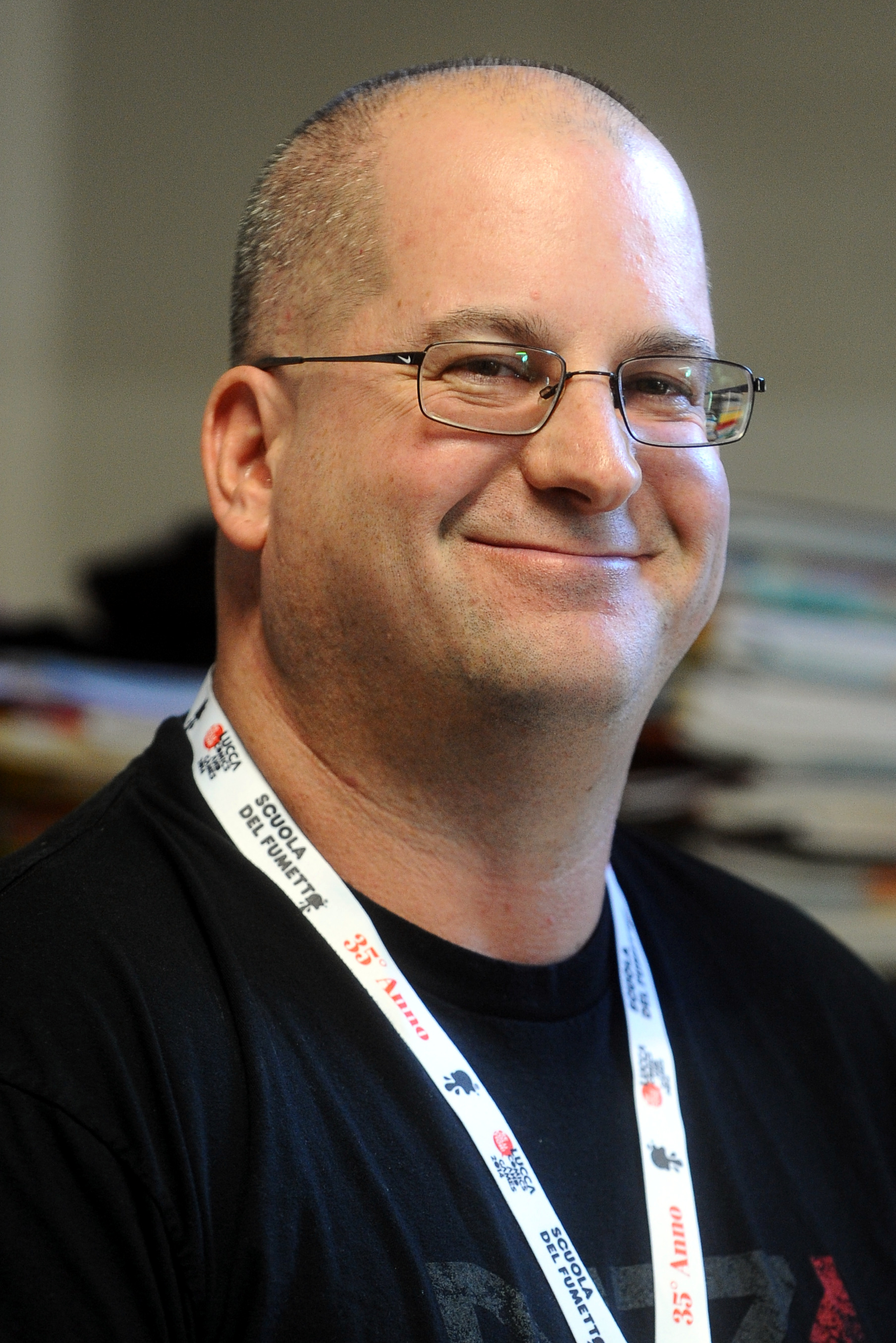
- Drew Karpyshyn at Lucca Comics & Games, 2014
- Born: July 28, 1971 (age 55); Edmonton, Alberta, Canada
- Occupations: Novelist, game designer
- Spouse: Jennifer Karpyshyn
- Writing career
- Language: English
- Genres: Fantasy, science fiction
- Website: drewkarpyshyn.com

Drew Karpyshyn (born July 28, 1971) is a Canadian video game scenario writer, scriptwriter and novelist. He served as a senior writer on Star Wars: Knights of the Old Republic for BioWare and lead writer for the first two Mass Effect video games. He left BioWare in 2012 to focus on his Chaos Born novels, and returned to it three years later in 2015. On March 9, 2018, he announced he was leaving BioWare once again to pursue his independent work. In 2020, he joined Archetype Entertainment.

== Career ==
Karpyshyn was at one point employed as a loan officer. Following a car accident, he quit his job and returned to college, gaining a degree in English. He got his start as a game designer for Wizards of the Coast, and he also has written two novels for Wizards of the Coast, both published in 2001 and both set in the Forgotten Realms setting: Baldur's Gate II: Throne of Bhaal and Temple Hill.

Karpyshyn joined the video game company BioWare in 2000. He wrote the scenario and much of the dialogue for Star Wars: Knights of the Old Republic, for which he would share the award for "Excellence in Writing" at the 2003 Game Developers Choice Awards. He was later one of the lead writers and planners on Jade Empire, and worked on several games in the Baldur's Gate series. His next major project was the Mass Effect series of games. His third book, Darth Bane: Path of Destruction was published by Del Rey Ballantine Books in 2006.

Mass Effect was named Game of the Year, in addition to receiving four other awards at the 2008 Elan Awards.

Karpyshyn moved to Austin, Texas to help with Star Wars: The Old Republic. He left BioWare in February 2012 to focus more on his own projects. He returned to BioWare in 2015 to focus on the post-release development of Star Wars: The Old Republic. He later started working on Anthem in 2017. In March 2018, he announced that he would once again leave BioWare to work on other things, including more original novels, co-creating a sci-fi graphic novel, and freelance gaming work.

Karpyshyn announced in February 2020 that he had joined Archetype Entertainment, an internal studio of Wizards of the Coast with former BioWare staff James Ohlen and Chad Robertson as studio leads. Archetype had been revealed in January 2020 and that it was working on a new science fiction role-playing game. Karpyshyn said that while his interest in video game development waned as BioWare had changed over the years, "my passion has been rekindled. The feel in the studio reminds me of my early days at BioWare; I can feel the magic in the air." In 2023, Archetype announced their game Exodus, with Karpyshyn serving as a narrative director.

== Personal life ==
Karpyshyn was born on July 28, 1971, in Edmonton, Alberta, Canada. He is of Ukrainian descent. He previously lived in Sherwood Park, Alberta, Canada, with his wife Jennifer. In the spring of 2009, he moved with his family to Austin, Texas.

In March 2000, Karpyshyn appeared on an episode of Jeopardy!, finishing third. He is a fan of the NFL's San Diego Chargers. He believes that in the NFL, Bill Belichick is most likely to follow the ways of the Sith, and Peyton Manning is the most likely to be a Jedi. Though his musical tastes lean more to what he calls "mainstream alternative", such as the Foo Fighters and Green Day, he also enjoys Sage Francis' song "The Best of Times". He prefers to write at night without any music playing.

== Works ==
=== Games ===
- Baldur's Gate II: Shadows of Amn (2000)
- Baldur's Gate II: Throne of Bhaal (2001)
- Neverwinter Nights (2002)
- Neverwinter Nights: Hordes of the Underdark (2003)
- Star Wars: Knights of the Old Republic (2003)
- Jade Empire (2005)
- Mass Effect (2007)
- Mass Effect 2 (2010)
- Star Wars: The Old Republic (2011)
- Anthem (2019)
- Exodus (2027)

=== Novels ===
==== Forgotten Realms ====
- Baldur's Gate II: Throne of Bhaal (novelization) (2001)
- Temple Hill (2001)

==== Star Wars ====
- Star Wars - Darth Bane: Path of Destruction (2006)
- Star Wars - Darth Bane: Rule of Two (2007)
- Star Wars - Darth Bane: Dynasty of Evil (2009)
- Star Wars: The Old Republic: Revan (2011)
- Star Wars: The Old Republic: Annihilation (2012)

==== Mass Effect ====
- Mass Effect: Revelation (2007) (Prequel to the video game series)
- Mass Effect: Ascension (2008)
- Mass Effect: Retribution (2010)

==== Chaos Born ====
- Children of Fire (2013)
- The Scorched Earth (2014)
- Chaos Unleashed (2015)
