= James Ohlen =

Canadian video game designer

- Occupations: Video game designer, Founder of Arcanum Worlds
- Known for: Baldur's Gate (series); Star Wars: Knights of the Old Republic (series); Dragon Age: Origins
- Website: www.arcanumworlds.com

James Ohlen is a Canadian video game designer. He was Senior Creative Director of BioWare, and worked at the company for 22 years. He started the publishing company Arcanum Worlds in 2018. In 2019, Ohlen became the lead of a new internal development studio Archetype Entertainment under Wizards of the Coast to develop new intellectual property and video games for the company.

== Career ==
In his early career, Ohlen ran a comic store as well as two Dungeons & Dragons campaigns. The campaigns were so popular that each had a waiting list. BioWare founders Ray Muzyka and Greg Zeschuk recruited Ohlen to work at the company based on his D&D skills. At BioWare, part of his early work included testing on Shattered Steel, then becoming the lead designer for Baldur's Gate which was credited with making BioWare a successful company. As a result of the success of Baldur's Gate, Ohlen was made the company's Director of Design. He continued to work as the lead designer on BioWare's Dungeons and Dragons titles including Baldur's Gate 2 and Neverwinter Nights. He later led up the design on Star Wars: Knights of the Old Republic and Dragon Age: Origins.

In 2006 James Ohlen moved to Austin, Texas to set up a new studio for BioWare alongside Gordon Walton and Rich Vogel. That studio was responsible for the production of the MMORPG game Star Wars: The Old Republic.

In 2018 Ohlen retired from BioWare after 22 years to start up his own publishing company – Arcanum Worlds. The first book to be produced by Arcanum Worlds is Odyssey of the Dragonlords.

Wizards of the Coast announced it was establishing a new Austin-based studio in April 2019 to develop new intellectual properties (IP), and had tapped Ohlen to lead it. Ohlen said that the offer was too good to pass up, and that "This is just an opportunity to work on projects as personal to me as the good ol' days of the '90s and early '00s." By January 2020, Wizards of the Coast revealed the studio as Archetype Entertainment, and that another former BioWare member, Chad Robertson, was named as vice-president and general manager. A month later, Drew Karpyshyn, yet another former BioWare member, came on board Archetype as lead writer. Ohlen was able to continue Arcanum Worlds under the deal, though the studio would not use any of the IP developed through Arcanum.

On December 17, 2025, it was revealed that James Ohlen had stepped down from his role as Studio Head at Archetype Entertainment. The update came days after a new gameplay trailer for Exodus, along with the game's launch date, were shared at the 2025 Game Awards.

== Works ==
=== As Lead Designer/Creative Director ===
- Baldur's Gate (1998)
- Baldur's Gate: Tales of the Sword Coast (1999)
- Baldur's Gate II: Shadows of Amn (2000)
- Neverwinter Nights (2002)
- Star Wars: Knights of the Old Republic (2003)
- Dragon Age: Origins (2009)
- Star Wars: The Old Republic (2011)

=== Other games ===
- Shattered Steel (1996)
- Jade Empire (2005)
- Mass Effect (2007)
- Anthem (2019)
- Shadow Realms (cancelled)
