= List of video games with LGBTQ characters =

The following is a list of confirmed video games with lesbian, gay, bisexual, transgender and queer characters, including any others falling under the LGBTQ umbrella term. The numbers in this list are possibly higher because some characters remained unconfirmed, unsourced, or controversial.

== History ==
During the 1980s, characters who can be argued as identifying as LGBTQ+ were rarely shown in a realistic or non-stereotypical context and were often the objects of ridicule or jokes.

In the 1990s, games (often Japanese ones) continued to use stereotypical LGBT characters which did not reflect the diversity in LGBT communities. However, more efforts were made to make more diverse and less one-dimensional characters.

In 2018, GamesRadar's Sam Greer found 179 games with any LGBT representation. Of those 179 games, only 83 have queer characters who are playable characters. And of those, only eight feature a main character who is explicitly pre-written as queer as opposed to them being queer as a character creation option.

In 2024, GLAAD found that under 2% of digitally-distributed games for PlayStation, Xbox, and Nintendo consoles were noted by their respective companies as having LGBT content, and under 2.5% of Steam games were tagged as LGBT.

== Games ==
The following is a list of confirmed video games with lesbian, gay, bisexual, transgender and queer characters, including any others falling under the LGBTQ umbrella term. The game character roles are either a player character (PC) or a non-player character (NPC).

=== 1980s ===
Year	Game	Character	Classification	Notes	References
1985	Le crime du parking	Paco	Gay	The culprit in the murder mystery is revealed to be the tailor, Paco, who is gay and deals drugs.	
1985	Le mur de Berlin va sauter	Carlus	Gay	The main antagonist and left-wing terrorist Carlus, who wants to blow up the Berlin Wall, is gay, and a lot of the action is spent in gay nightclubs and public baths.	
1986	Moonmist	Vivien Pentreath	Lesbian	In one of the possible storylines, it is revealed that Vivien, a friend of Lord Jack, was in a relationship with his former fiancée Deirdre—before her apparent suicide—and was jealous that she chose Lord Jack over her.	
1986	Moonmist	Deirdre Hallam	Bisexual woman	In one of the possible storylines, it is revealed that Vivien, a friend of Lord Jack, was in a relationship with his former fiancée Deirdre—before her apparent suicide—and was jealous that she chose Lord Jack over her.	
1988	Caper in the Castro	Tracker McDyke	Lesbian	A murder mystery problem-solving game for Apple Mac computers written in the HyperCard language, distributed on underground gay bulletin boards, starring the lesbian detective Tracker McDyke. C. M. Ralph, who wrote the game, later released a straightwashed version called "Murder on Main Street" and published by Heizer Software	
1988	Caper in the Castro	Tessy LaFemme	Gay, Drag Queen	A murder mystery problem-solving game for Apple Mac computers written in the HyperCard language, distributed on underground gay bulletin boards, starring the lesbian detective Tracker McDyke. C. M. Ralph, who wrote the game, later released a straightwashed version called "Murder on Main Street" and published by Heizer Software	
1989	Circuit's Edge	Yasmin	Trans woman	The game features a transgender woman named Yasmin, alleged to be the player character's former lover, and a gay man named Saied.	
1989	Circuit's Edge	Saied	Gay	The game features a transgender woman named Yasmin, alleged to be the player character's former lover, and a gay man named Saied.	
1989	Phantasy Star II	Usvestia	Gay	Usvestia will teach the MUSIK piano technique needed to progress in the game more cheaply to male characters because they "look cute". In the English version, he instead says "He looks smart," and the gender-based disparity is left unexplained.	
1989	Leisure Suit Larry III: Passionate Patti in Pursuit of the Pulsating Pectorals	Kalalau	Bisexual	Kalalau, a character from the previous game, is married to Larry, but dumps him at the start of the game for another woman, Bobbi.	
1989	Leisure Suit Larry III: Passionate Patti in Pursuit of the Pulsating Pectorals	Bobbi	Lesbian	Bobbi is a woman in a relationship with Kalalau. She is described within the game as a lesbian.	

=== 1990s ===
Year	Game	Character	Type	Classification	Notes	References
1990	Rise of the Dragon	Patrons of the Pleasure Dome	NPC	Queer	In an establishment called the Pleasure Dome that caters to queer patrons, among other things. One of its patrons is a woman posing as a man posing as a woman.	
1992	The Dagger of Amon Ra	Olympia Myklos	NPC	Bisexual	This game features a woman from a small town who gets a job for a New York paper in the 1920s and is tasked with investigating a theft at a local museum. Two of the women she meets there, Olympia Myklos and Yvette Delacroix, are implied to have been involved in a secret love affair, while also being in relationships with male characters.	
1992	The Dagger of Amon Ra	Yvette Delacroix	NPC	Bisexual	This game features a woman from a small town who gets a job for a New York paper in the 1920s and is tasked with investigating a theft at a local museum. Two of the women she meets there, Olympia Myklos and Yvette Delacroix, are implied to have been involved in a secret love affair, while also being in relationships with male characters.	
1992	The Dagger of Amon Ra	A flapper	NPC	Lesbian	A flapper flirts with protagonist Laura Bow in a speakeasy changing room.	
1992	Ultima VII: The Black Gate	Sex workers	NPC	Bisexual	In the House of Baths at Buccaneer's Den, the player (the "Avatar") can pay for the services of male and female sex workers, regardless of the player's gender.	
1992	GayBlade	Player Character	PC	Queer	As well as openly proclaiming itself as "The World's First Gay & Lesbian Computer Game" on the title screen, the player can select from various class choices such as Queer, Drag Queen, Guppie, and Lesbian with themed gear to match.	
1992	Great Greed	Player character and several male NPCs		Bisexual	At the end of the game, when given the choice to marry one of the princesses, the male player character can repeatedly insist to marry one of the male NPCs and this option will eventually be granted. This is probably the first instance of same-sex marriage being an option for the player in a video game.	
1992	Rex Nebular and the Cosmic Gender Bender	Rex Nebular	PC	Genderqueer	The game requires the male hero to change his sex on a planet where women rule.	
1993	Ultima VII Part Two: Serpent Isle	Fridigazzi	NPC	Bisexual	Fridigazzi is a mage who sexually proposes to the player's character regardless of the character's gender. The player is given the choice to accept or decline.	
1993	Dracula Unleashed	Alfred Horner	NPC	Gay	Alfred Horner is a gay man who co-owns a bookstore. This was the first time a gay character in a computer game was given a speaking role.	
1993	Return of the Phantom	Charles	NPC	Gay	Charles is portrayed as an effeminate theater director. He is one of the good guys who helps the playable character, a French inspector, solve the mystery of the Phantom of the Opera once and for all.	
1993	Leisure Suit Larry 6: Shape Up or Slip Out!	Gary	NPC	Gay	Gary is a gay towel attendant. Larry is given the option of flirting with him, although this leads to a game over.	
1993	Police Quest: Open Season	Bob Hickman	NPC	Gay	A gay bar is featured in the game. The player is a police officer trying to track down the murderer of his partner. His quest leads him to discover that his partner had a double life as a cross-dresser at a West Hollywood transgender bar.	
1994	Streets of Rage 3	Ash	NPC	Gay	Ash acts as a boss in the game and is portrayed with "tight clothes and effeminate movements". He was censored in some versions of the game.	
1994	EarthBound	Tony	NPC	Gay	Tony has subtle attractions to his best friend Jeff, according to EarthBound creator, Shigesato Itoi.	
1995	Ane-san	Okita Sōji / Sohshi		Genderqueer	Sōji is mentioned to be born male with a feminine demeanor in the game's introduction. Much like every other playable character from the all-female video game, Sōji marries a man in its ending.	
1995	The Beast Within: A Gabriel Knight Mystery	Baron Von Glower	NPC	Gay	The antagonist Baron Von Glower pursues the protagonist Gabriel Knight sexually and eventually leads him to be turned into a werewolf.	
1995	Chrono Trigger	Flea	NPC	Genderqueer	Flea, a major villain, is genderfluid and/or gender nonconforming. Notably, Flea stated in a self-referential manner "Male or female, what difference does it make? Power is beautiful, and I've got the power."	
1995	The Orion Conspiracy	Danny McCormack	NPC	Gay	This is the first computer game to use the word homosexual. The main character, Devlin McCormack, lives on a space station where he investigates the murder of his son, Danny McCormack, and stops an alien invasion. His investigation leads him through the seedy, criminal underworld of the station, where he discovers that his son was homosexual by talking with his son's boyfriend, Steve Kaufmann.	
1995	The Orion Conspiracy	Steve Kaufmann	NPC	Gay	This is the first computer game to use the word homosexual. The main character, Devlin McCormack, lives on a space station where he investigates the murder of his son, Danny McCormack, and stops an alien invasion. His investigation leads him through the seedy, criminal underworld of the station, where he discovers that his son was homosexual by talking with his son's boyfriend, Steve Kaufmann.	
1995	True Love	Daisuke	PC	Bisexual	At the end of the game, the player character—whose default name is Daisuke—may attempt to start a relationship with any of the ten available girls, or with his best friend Kazuhiko as the only gay option. Depending on the choices taken and interactions experienced throughout the game, each girl and Kazuhiko may or may not be available for a relationship.	
1995	True Love	Kazuhiko Miyoshi	NPC	Gay	At the end of the game, the player character—whose default name is Daisuke—may attempt to start a relationship with any of the ten available girls, or with his best friend Kazuhiko as the only gay option. Depending on the choices taken and interactions experienced throughout the game, each girl and Kazuhiko may or may not be available for a relationship.	
1996	Bahamut Lagoon	Sendak	NPC	Gay	Sendak is an older wizard who, at one point, flirts with the male protagonist, Byuu. The player can choose to accept or reject these advances.	
1996	Blazing Dragons	Sir Blaze	NPC	Gay	Sir Blaze, a dragon knight, is implied to be gay, similar to the cartoon.	
1996	Blazing Dragons	Trivet	NPC	Gay	Trivet is a dragon jester who works for the king. He hates being a jester and is trying to look for another job. He learns about hypnotism. He hypnotizes Flicker into believing he is Princess Flame. The effect is temporary, and Flicker goes back to normal. When Trivet tries to hypnotize Flicker again, Flicker deflects it onto Trivet by making him believe he is Flame. Trivet-as-Flame flirts with Sir Loungealot for a few scenes. When Sir Loungealot kisses Trivet, it snaps him out of his hypnosis. Sir Longealot realizes he wasn't kissing Flame but Trivet. However, Trivet happily thinks that Sir Loungealot would care about him in that way, much to the dragon knight's repulsion.	
1996	SimCopter	Player character, unnamed men		Gay	In response to another developer adding "bimbo" characters into the game, the game's designer and gay man Jacques Servin inserted shirtless male characters into the game that kiss each other and the player character. Servin was fired, and a new version of the game without his modifications was released.	
1996	Phantasmagoria 2: A Puzzle of Flesh	Curtis Craig	PC	Bisexual man	Curtis is the game's protagonist. He is also a close friend with his co-worker, Trevor, who is gay. Curtis admits to his psychiatrist that he has feelings for Trevor and might be bisexual, and the two almost kiss later in the game. Curtis is also shown as having relations with his girlfriend and a S&M domme. The creators of the game talked about the mature sexual themes in the game during a 1997 interview. Curtis is the first playable non-heterosexual character in a video game.	
1996	Phantasmagoria 2: A Puzzle of Flesh	Trevor Barnes	NPC	Gay	Curtis is the game's protagonist. He is also a close friend with his co-worker, Trevor, who is gay. Curtis admits to his psychiatrist that he has feelings for Trevor and might be bisexual, and the two almost kiss later in the game. Curtis is also shown as having relations with his girlfriend and a S&M domme. The creators of the game talked about the mature sexual themes in the game during a 1997 interview. Curtis is the first playable non-heterosexual character in a video game.	
1996	NiGHTS into Dreams	NiGHTS	PC	Agender	According to Takashi Iizuka, NiGHTS doesn't have a gender and "[the] impressions of the character with regards to gender are totally up to the player".	
1997	The Last Express	Sophie de Bretheuil	NPC	Lesbian	This game has the player meeting two young adult girls named Sophie de Bretheuil and Rebecca Norton, who are almost always in each other's company. While at first they appear to be merely close friends, reading the diary of Rebecca suggests they are lesbians, but there are no explicitly homosexual gestures beyond hand-holding.	
1997	The Last Express	Rebecca Norton	NPC	Lesbian	This game has the player meeting two young adult girls named Sophie de Bretheuil and Rebecca Norton, who are almost always in each other's company. While at first they appear to be merely close friends, reading the diary of Rebecca suggests they are lesbians, but there are no explicitly homosexual gestures beyond hand-holding.	
1997	SaGa Frontier	Asellus		Lesbian	Infused with the Charm Lord's mystical blood, Asellus is attracted to other women, and other women are attracted to her. Gina "calls Lady Asellus beautiful and blushes" at her during conversations, and they can marry each other in one of the game's multiple endings.	
1997	SaGa Frontier	Gina		Lesbian or heteroflexible	Infused with the Charm Lord's mystical blood, Asellus is attracted to other women, and other women are attracted to her. Gina "calls Lady Asellus beautiful and blushes" at her during conversations, and they can marry each other in one of the game's multiple endings.	
1997	Devil Summoner: Soul Hackers	Beta		Gay	Beta is one of the owners of the EL-115 Club alongside his brother Alpha. Described as an "over-the-top caricature of an effeminate gay man who speaks with a lisp", Beta continually comments on the male player's attractiveness.	
1998	Star Ocean: The Second Story	Claude C. Kenny		Gay, lesbian or bisexual	The player can choose to play as either Claude or Rena. They can have a friendship and romance level with each party member acquired. Ashton (a male party member) and Precis (a female party member) can go on a date with them, regardless of their gender.	
1998	Star Ocean: The Second Story	Rena Lanford		Gay, lesbian or bisexual	The player can choose to play as either Claude or Rena. They can have a friendship and romance level with each party member acquired. Ashton (a male party member) and Precis (a female party member) can go on a date with them, regardless of their gender.	
1998	Star Ocean: The Second Story	Ashton Anchors		Gay, lesbian or bisexual	The player can choose to play as either Claude or Rena. They can have a friendship and romance level with each party member acquired. Ashton (a male party member) and Precis (a female party member) can go on a date with them, regardless of their gender.	
1998	Star Ocean: The Second Story	Precis F. Neumann		Gay, lesbian or bisexual	The player can choose to play as either Claude or Rena. They can have a friendship and romance level with each party member acquired. Ashton (a male party member) and Precis (a female party member) can go on a date with them, regardless of their gender.	
1999	The Longest Journey	Fiona	NPC	Lesbian	This computer game features Fiona and Mickey, a lesbian landlady and her long-time lover.	
1999	The Longest Journey	Mickey	NPC	Lesbian	This computer game features Fiona and Mickey, a lesbian landlady and her long-time lover.	
1999	The Longest Journey	A cop	NPC	Gay	One of the characters is a gay cop.	
1999	The Silver Case	Tetsugoro Kusabi		Gay	Tetsugoro Kusabi is a detective and one of the founding members of the HC unit. Kusabi takes a liking to the male protagonist, giving him the affectionate nickname "Big Dick". Kusabi is also enamored with his close friend and co-worker, Sumio Kodai, despite being married. In a 2021 r/games thread, game director Suda51 confirmed his sexuality.	

=== 2000s ===
Year	Game	Character	Type	Classification	Notes	References
2000	The Sims	Sims		Gay, lesbian, or bisexual	All Sims can be directed to fall in love with and engage in romantic interactions with other Sims of either sex.	
2001	RuneScape	Angof		Trans woman	Angof is a female character in "The Light Within", a quest released on August 24, 2015. At some point after the quest, the player can show her a wedding ring, prompting her to tell the player she was born male, but "corrected" herself to female once she could shapeshift.	
2001	Fear Effect 2: Retro Helix	Hana Tsu-Vachel	PC	Bisexual woman	Hana Tsu-Vachel is bisexual and in a relationship with her hacker; Rain Qin. The game's advertising heavily emphasized their relationship.	
2001	Fear Effect 2: Retro Helix	Rain Qin		Lesbian	Hana Tsu-Vachel is bisexual and in a relationship with her hacker; Rain Qin. The game's advertising heavily emphasized their relationship.	
2001	Shadow Hearts	Meiyuan		Gay	Meiyuan is a gay Chinese acupuncturist.	
2002	The Elder Scrolls III: Morrowind	Vivec		Intersex	In the in-game books The 36 Lessons of Vivec, Vivec describes himself as "brother-sister" and "of male and female, the magic hermaphrodite."	
2003	Star Wars: Knights of the Old Republic	Juhani	NPC	Lesbian	The party member Juhani is lesbian, though bugged coding on the initial release allowed her to be attracted to the player character regardless of gender. In subsequent patches, she reverts to same-sex preferences. She and Belaya, another female Jedi, were also heavily implied to be lovers. This would make Juhani the first known gay character in the Star Wars universe.	
2003	Star Wars: Knights of the Old Republic	Belaya		Lesbian	The party member Juhani is lesbian, though bugged coding on the initial release allowed her to be attracted to the player character regardless of gender. In subsequent patches, she reverts to same-sex preferences. She and Belaya, another female Jedi, were also heavily implied to be lovers. This would make Juhani the first known gay character in the Star Wars universe.	
2003	Deus Ex: Invisible War	Mark Finley	NPC	Gay	One way to gain access to the apartment of Mark Finley, Seattle's Minister of Culture, is to flirt with him at Club Vox; he will give the character his key. This only works if the character is male.	
2003	Deus Ex: Invisible War	Lionel		Gay		
2004	Phoenix Wright: Ace Attorney – Trials and Tribulations	Jean Armstrong		Gay	Trials and Tribulations localization team director Janet Hsu, in looking through all the information that is given about Jean in the game, concluded that he is a gay man who likes to perform non-passing drag. Looking back at the game in 2014, Hsu said that they still thought Jean caused confusion due to the general public having a less informed and nuanced understanding of gender and sexuality at the time of the game's release.	
2004	Fable	Player character and NPC townspeople		Gay or bisexual	The male protagonist can romance and marry various characters, regardless of gender. However, while a marriage between the protagonist and a woman is treated as a legitimate marriage, one with a male NPC is treated comically, and the union is referred to as "just a couple of blokes being blokes".	
2004	The Sims 2	Sims		Gay, lesbian, or bisexual	Sims can romance and even marry other Sims of the same sex.	
2004	The Temple of Elemental Evil	Bertram		Gay	This computer game has an optional storyline permitting a gay marriage. In the town of Nulb, a pirate named Bertram begins flirting with male characters at the party and offers a lifetime of love and happiness in exchange for his freedom.	
2004	Outlaw Golf 2	Summer		Lesbian	Playable character Summer kisses Autumn to calm down if the player fails a shot.	
2004	Outlaw Golf 2	Autumn		Lesbian	Playable character Summer kisses Autumn to calm down if the player fails a shot.	
2004	Vampire: The Masquerade – Bloodlines	Player character		Lesbian or bisexual	The player can have sex with female prostitutes or Jeanette as either a man or a woman.	
2004	Vampire: The Masquerade – Bloodlines	Jeanette Voerman		Bisexual woman	The female player character can have implied offscreen sexual relations with Jeanette, another female character.	
2004	World of Warcraft	Chromie/Chronormu		Transgender woman	Chromie—a dragon who may appear as humanoid—adopted a female "visage form" and preferred pronouns after a draconic ceremony ("Visage Day"). This was clarified by then-narrative lead Steve Danuser in 2021, after the publishing of a short story of the ceremony in World of Warcraft: Folk & Fairy Tales of Azeroth the same year, an anthology of franchise-relevant stories.	
2004	World of Warcraft	Flynn Fairwind		Bisexual	The romantic relationship between Flynn and Matthias was first shown in the book Shadows Rising (2020) by Madeleine Roux.	
2004	World of Warcraft	Matthias Shaw		Gay	The romantic relationship between Flynn and Matthias was first shown in the book Shadows Rising (2020) by Madeleine Roux.	
2004	World of Warcraft	Pelagos		Transgender man	As Shadowlands takes place in an afterlife realm, the characters the players meet are often previously deceased. After death, the Kyrian Pelagos – who had a "female form in life" – chose to take on a male form in his afterlife. This is detailed through in-game dialogue with the NPC.	
2004	World of Warcraft	Thiernax and Qadarin		Gay	The player has to assist Thiernax, a former "night warrior", in rescuing his husband, Qadarin. This takes place in the main storyline of one of Shadowlands' four factions.	
2005	Togainu no Chi	Akira		Gay	Depending on choices made throughout the story, the game's protagonist can enter a romantic relationship with many other men.	
2005	Togainu no Chi	Keisuke		Gay	Depending on choices made throughout the story, the game's protagonist can enter a romantic relationship with many other men.	
2005	Togainu no Chi	Rin		Gay	Depending on choices made throughout the story, the game's protagonist can enter a romantic relationship with many other men.	
2005	Togainu no Chi	Shiki		Gay	Depending on choices made throughout the story, the game's protagonist can enter a romantic relationship with many other men.	
2005	Togainu no Chi	Motomi		Gay	Depending on choices made throughout the story, the game's protagonist can enter a romantic relationship with many other men.	
2005	Jade Empire	Last Spirit Monk		Gay, lesbian, or bisexual	The player—the Last Spirit Monk—can choose to play as either male or female. The player, regardless of gender, can romance Sky or Silk Fox. While only a male player can romance the Dawn Star, players can enter a ménage à trois with her and Silk Fox.	
2005	Jade Empire	Sky		Bisexual man	The player—the Last Spirit Monk—can choose to play as either male or female. The player, regardless of gender, can romance Sky or Silk Fox. While only a male player can romance the Dawn Star, players can enter a ménage à trois with her and Silk Fox.	
2005	Jade Empire	Silk Fox		Bisexual woman	The player—the Last Spirit Monk—can choose to play as either male or female. The player, regardless of gender, can romance Sky or Silk Fox. While only a male player can romance the Dawn Star, players can enter a ménage à trois with her and Silk Fox.	
2005	Jade Empire	Dawn Star		Bisexual woman	The player—the Last Spirit Monk—can choose to play as either male or female. The player, regardless of gender, can romance Sky or Silk Fox. While only a male player can romance the Dawn Star, players can enter a ménage à trois with her and Silk Fox.	
2005	Drakengard 2	Yaha		Bisexual	Yaha is an enemy character who is in love with his old friend Urick, one of the playable characters.	
2005	Fahrenheit	Tommy		Gay	This computer and console game includes a gay stock market follower named Tommy. One of the game's protagonists is good friends with him, and Tommy's knowledge of the stock market is essential in progressing in the game. If asked, he mentions that he's dating someone.	
2006	Enchanted Arms	Makoto		Gay	Makoto is fervently in love with Toya and the game's promotional materials list him as openly gay.	
2006	Mother 3	Magypsies		Genderqueer	They are a genderless race, but their appearance and attitude are a parody of drag queens. Also, Ionia will teach Lucas "PK Love" in a scene that can be interpreted as sexual.	
2006	Baten Kaitos Origins	Guillo		Genderqueer	One of the three main characters, Guillo, speaks simultaneously with the voice of both a man and a woman.	
2006	Bully	Jimmy Hopkins	PC	Bisexual	Jimmy can kiss both boys and girls. In the Xbox version the player can unlock an achievement by kissing a boy twenty times.	
2006	Bully	Cornelius Johnson	NPC	Bisexual	Jimmy is able to kiss one male character from each of the game's six social cliques, resulting in six possible same-sex romantic interactions. These encounters are unlocked by repeatedly interacting with the selected character until the relationship indicator changes from a “thumbs up” icon to a bouquet, enabling Jimmy to present the character with flowers, after which the option to kiss becomes available.	
2006	Bully	Vance Medici	NPC	Bisexual	Jimmy is able to kiss one male character from each of the game's six social cliques, resulting in six possible same-sex romantic interactions. These encounters are unlocked by repeatedly interacting with the selected character until the relationship indicator changes from a “thumbs up” icon to a bouquet, enabling Jimmy to present the character with flowers, after which the option to kiss becomes available.	
2006	Bully	Trent Northwick	NPC	Bisexual	Jimmy is able to kiss one male character from each of the game's six social cliques, resulting in six possible same-sex romantic interactions. These encounters are unlocked by repeatedly interacting with the selected character until the relationship indicator changes from a “thumbs up” icon to a bouquet, enabling Jimmy to present the character with flowers, after which the option to kiss becomes available.	
2006	Bully	Gord Vendome	NPC	Bisexual	Jimmy is able to kiss one male character from each of the game's six social cliques, resulting in six possible same-sex romantic interactions. These encounters are unlocked by repeatedly interacting with the selected character until the relationship indicator changes from a “thumbs up” icon to a bouquet, enabling Jimmy to present the character with flowers, after which the option to kiss becomes available.	
2006	Bully	Kirby Olsen	NPC	Bisexual	Jimmy is able to kiss one male character from each of the game's six social cliques, resulting in six possible same-sex romantic interactions. These encounters are unlocked by repeatedly interacting with the selected character until the relationship indicator changes from a “thumbs up” icon to a bouquet, enabling Jimmy to present the character with flowers, after which the option to kiss becomes available.	
2006	Bully	Duncan	NPC	Bisexual	Jimmy is able to kiss one male character from each of the game's six social cliques, resulting in six possible same-sex romantic interactions. These encounters are unlocked by repeatedly interacting with the selected character until the relationship indicator changes from a “thumbs up” icon to a bouquet, enabling Jimmy to present the character with flowers, after which the option to kiss becomes available.	
2006	The Secrets of Da Vinci: The Forbidden Manuscript	Leonardo da Vinci		Gay	The game is set in the Manoir du Cloux, the former residence of Leonardo da Vinci. The protagonist, Valdo, arrives there in search of the artist's lost manuscript. Throughout the narrative, the game strongly suggests an intimate relationship between Leonardo and Salaì. One of the most telling details is a hidden passage concealed behind a bookcase, linking Leonardo's bedroom directly to Salaì's. Above the entrance appears the inscription "Path of Pleasures," and the mechanism to unlock the passage requires the player to select specific books whose titles spell out the name Salaì.	
2006	The Secrets of Da Vinci: The Forbidden Manuscript	Salaì		Gay	Salaì is referred to as Leonardo's "diabolical lover"	
2007	BioShock	Sander Cohen		Gay	The insane artist Sander Cohen is confirmed to be gay by the game's creative director Ken Levine.	
2007	Clive Barker's Jericho	Cassus Vicus		Bisexual man	The Ancient Roman Governor Cassus Vicus claims it had been a while since "tasting" both genders after becoming aroused while confronting the Jericho Squad. Vicus is portrayed as overly perverted and morbidly obese and is said to practice cannibalism, sadomasochism and "blood orgies".	
2007	Clive Barker's Jericho	Abigail Black	PC	Lesbian	A telekinetic sniper and confirmed lesbian.	
2008	Corpse Party: Blood Covered	Seiko Shinohara		Lesbian	Seiko is shown to have romantic feelings for her best friend, Naomi Nakashima.	
2008	Captain Rainbow	Birdo		Trans woman	Birdo was imprisoned for using the women's bathroom. Birdo asks the player to find proof of her being female so she can be set free.	
2008	Mighty Jill Off	Jill		Lesbian	Jill and her Queen's relationship is the core drive of the game, with Jill's desire to return to her Queen acting as her primary motivation, and their BDSM practices providing context for the game's difficulty. The game's designer, Anna Anthropy, confirmed The Queen is canonically trans on the game's itch.io page.	
2008	Mighty Jill Off	The Queen		Trans woman, lesbian	Jill and her Queen's relationship is the core drive of the game, with Jill's desire to return to her Queen acting as her primary motivation, and their BDSM practices providing context for the game's difficulty. The game's designer, Anna Anthropy, confirmed The Queen is canonically trans on the game's itch.io page.	
2008	Violet	Violet		Bisexual	The player is either a man or a woman, and Violet is their girlfriend. The player is freely able to change their gender and sex mid-game, which mostly only results in a few cosmetic changes in the dialogue. Violet serves as the game's narrator, but the player character is only imagining how she would narrate. Upon gender-changing, Violet may react by saying, "I adore you either way."	
2009	League of Legends	Diana		Lesbian	As part of the Pride 2021 event celebrating LGBT Pride Month, Riot Games released the short story "Rise With Me", focusing on the backstory of Diana and Leona. The short story details how the two women fell in love and were each other's first kiss. The two feature in a shared cosmetic released for the event. They also feature in promotional art for Riot's 2023 and 2024 Pride celebrations.	
2009	League of Legends	Leona		Bisexual	As part of the Pride 2021 event celebrating LGBT Pride Month, Riot Games released the short story "Rise With Me", focusing on the backstory of Diana and Leona. The short story details how the two women fell in love and were each other's first kiss. The two feature in a shared cosmetic released for the event. They also feature in promotional art for Riot's 2023 and 2024 Pride celebrations.	
2009	League of Legends	Caitlyn		Lesbian	In the animated series Arcane (2021–present), which is set a few years before the events of the game, there are multiple hints that Vi and Caitlyn are attracted to each other. The pair also featured together in cosmetics released for Valentine's Day 2023. In promotional art for Riot Games' 2023 Pride Event, Vi is shown wearing a lesbian flag pin. They also appear in promotional art for the 2024 Pride Event.	
2009	League of Legends	Vi		Lesbian	In the animated series Arcane (2021–present), which is set a few years before the events of the game, there are multiple hints that Vi and Caitlyn are attracted to each other. The pair also featured together in cosmetics released for Valentine's Day 2023. In promotional art for Riot Games' 2023 Pride Event, Vi is shown wearing a lesbian flag pin. They also appear in promotional art for the 2024 Pride Event.	
2009	League of Legends	Neeko		Lesbian	Neeko was revealed to be a lesbian by senior narrative writer Matt Dunn in 2018, making her the game's first Champion to be openly LGBTQ. She has since appeared in promotional art for Riot's 2023 Pride celebrations, and in promotional art, and in-game cosmetics for Riot's 2024 Pride celebrations.	
2009	League of Legends	Rell		Bisexual or pansexual	Rell possesses in-game interactions where she expresses interest in both male and female characters. She has since appeared in promotional art for Riot's 2023 and 2024 Pride celebrations.	
2009	League of Legends	Nami		Bisexual	In League of Legends spin-off game Legends of Runeterra, Nami's partners Tama (female) and Loto (male) are introduced, revealing her bisexuality and polyamory. Their relationship was later confirmed by the game's narrative lead, Meaghan Bowe. Nami features in promotional art for Riot's 2023 and 2024 Pride celebrations.	
2009	League of Legends	Lee Sin		Gay	Udyr trained in Ionia with Lee Sin for a time before returning to his homeland of the Freljord. One of Udyr's alternate skins portrays a timeline where Udyr remains in Ionia. The League of Legends development team confirmed this was because Udyr chose to stay with Lee Sin, his partner and "roommate" (a euphemism used to allude to queer couples).	
2009	League of Legends	Udyr		Bisexual	Udyr trained in Ionia with Lee Sin for a time before returning to his homeland of the Freljord. One of Udyr's alternate skins portrays a timeline where Udyr remains in Ionia. The League of Legends development team confirmed this was because Udyr chose to stay with Lee Sin, his partner and "roommate" (a euphemism used to allude to queer couples).	
2009	League of Legends	Varus		Gay	Varus is a Darkin, a creature whose actual body is a weapon, who can possess someone who attempts to wield it, and Varus himself isn't gay. However, when he attempted to possess the gay couple Valmar and Kai at the same time and fuse them, the two hunters' love was strong enough to allow their conscience to be shared with the Darkin, with all three controlling the body. A music video titled "As We Fall" detailing these events was released in 2017.	
2009	League of Legends	Graves		Gay	Devon Giehl, former creative designer and writer at Riot Games, revealed in 2018 that she had initially planned for Graves and Twisted Fate to have been in a relationship, but the team was prevented from doing so. Despite this, many former and present employees have described them as a couple. Despite reports of internal censorship and push-back, the 2021 "Sentinels of Light" event did allude to Graves' relationship with Twisted Fate. The pair featured heavily in Riot's 2022 Pride Event, with in-game cosmetics revealing their relationship as romantic, and the two were represented in the event's promotional art. During the event, a story further highlighting their relationship was released. Both appear in League of Legends' 2023 Pride Month key art, with both of them wearing their flags. They also appear in key art for the Riot's 2024 Pride celebrations, with Twisted Fate appearing in in-game cosmetics for the event.	
2009	League of Legends	Twisted Fate		Pansexual		
2009	League of Legends	K'Sante		Gay	In October 2022, it was confirmed that K'Sante was LGBTQ+ by his voice actor, DeObai Oparei. In his backstory, he has an ex-named Tope. He also features in promotional art for Riot Games' 2023 Pride celebrations.	
2009	999: Nine Hours, Nine Persons, Nine Doors	Snake		Gay	In 2021, the game's director, Kotaro Uchikoshi, posted a Twitter poll asking if the character Snake is gay, and "Yes" won by a large margin.	

== Video game series ==
=== A–D ===
Series	Year	Game	Character	Classification	Notes
A Kiss for the Petals	2006–2016	All	Various girls, teachers, and nurses	Lesbian	A series of adult yuri visual novels.
Assassin's Creed	2007	Assassin's Creed	Abu'l Nuquod	Gay	Abu'l Nuquod, one of the assassination targets in this historically based game, is strongly implied to be gay. He believes that the people hate him because he is different, is shown caressing the cheek of one of his male guards during his angry tirade and claims that he cannot serve the cause of a God who calls him an abomination.
Assassin's Creed	2009	Assassin's Creed II	Leonardo da Vinci	Gay	Lifelong friend of protagonist Ezio Auditore da Firenze, Leonardo da Vinci is implied to be gay, based on similar historical evidence. On one occasion, he assures Ezio that "women provide little distraction."
Assassin's Creed	2010	Assassin's Creed: Brotherhood	Leonardo da Vinci	Gay	In the downloadable content The Da Vinci Disappearance, Ezio appears to know of Leonardo's romantic relationship with his pupil Salaì, stating that he approves of their relationship.
Assassin's Creed	2010	Assassin's Creed: Brotherhood	Salaì	Gay	In the downloadable content The Da Vinci Disappearance, Ezio appears to know of Leonardo's romantic relationship with his pupil Salaì, stating that he approves of their relationship.
Assassin's Creed	2015	Assassin's Creed Syndicate	Jacob Frye	Bisexual	The lead writer of the game indicated that the team explicitly avoided giving Jacob, one of the game's two protagonists, a female love interest. He also hinted that Jacob needed to "figure himself out to some degree" after his brief partnership with Maxwell Roth. This led to speculation regarding Jacob's sexuality, with the official Assassin's Creed Tumblr account confirming he is canonically bisexual.
Assassin's Creed	2015	Assassin's Creed Syndicate	Ned Wynert	Trans man	Ned Wynert is a minor non-playable character (NPC) and a trans man.
Assassin's Creed	2018	Assassin's Creed Odyssey	Alexios or Kassandra	Bisexual	The player can play as either Alexios or his sister Kassandra. Throughout the game, the player can interact with many men and women romantically. This will not change or have limits based on the character picked, meaning either sibling can have romantic and sexual relationships with a person of the same and/or opposite gender throughout the game.
Assassin's Creed	2018	Assassin's Creed Odyssey	Alkibiades	Bisexual	Alkibiades, the Athenian statesman, orator, and military commander, is portrayed in the game as a flamboyant, openly bisexual character whose pronounced promiscuity and flirtatiousness constitute central aspects of his personality.
Assassin's Creed	2018	Assassin's Creed Odyssey	Romanceable characters Female NPCs: Auxesia, Daphnae, Diona, Eritha, Kyra, Odessa, Roxana, Xenia, Zopheras Male NPCs: Kosta, Lykaon, Mikkos, Thaletas	Bisexual	The player can have relations with all romanceable NPCs, regardless of which protagonist they're playing as.
Assassin's Creed	2018	Assassin's Creed Odyssey	Gelon and Gyke	Lesbian	Gelon is a pirate the player can encounter in Phokis whose ship has disappeared, with her partner, Gyke, at the helm. She will ask the player to find them both. The ship is wrecked, with Gyke dead, by the time the player finds them, but they can return Gyke's armband to Gelon to offer some solace.
Blue Reflection	2017	Blue Reflection	Shihori Sugamoto	Lesbian	After some story events, Shihori develops a one-sided crush on the protagonist, Hinako. While the other girls, Hinako, can go on dates that are platonic, Shihori wishes to trade swimwear and underwear with Hinako.
Blue Reflection	2021	Blue Reflection: Second Light	Ao Hoshizaki and various girls	Lesbian	The female player character can go on dates with other party members, all of whom are female. During these dates, the player can choose platonic or flirtatious dialogue options.
Blue Reflection	2021	Blue Reflection: Second Light	Rena Miyauchi and Yuki Kinjou	Lesbian	During the story, it is revealed that before losing their memories and coming to the unknown school that serves as the setting for the game, Rena and Yuki were in a romantic relationship. This continues after their memories are regained - all the characters reference this relationship after this reveal, and Ao's dates with either of them past this point are platonic.
Borderlands	2009	Borderlands	Mad Moxxi	Bisexual or pansexual	She is very open about her sexual fluidity, referencing her many male and female lovers.
Borderlands	2012	Borderlands 2	Mad Moxxi	Bisexual or pansexual	She is very open about her sexual fluidity, referencing her many male and female lovers.
Borderlands	2012	Borderlands 2	Tiny Tina	Lesbian	It was confirmed by lead writer Anthony Burch on his ask.fm that she is lesbian.
Borderlands	2012	Borderlands 2	Axton	Bisexual	In the DLC Tiny Tina's Assault on Dragon Keep (2013), it is revealed that Axton, one of the playable characters, is bisexual. While his flirtatious lines with male characters were originally a coding error, Gearbox Studios decided to confirm his bisexuality with overt references in the DLC.
Borderlands	2012	Borderlands 2	Sir Hammerlock and Taggart	Gay	There is a sidequest given by Sir Hammerlock that involves finding his ex-boyfriend Taggart's audio logs on hunting for use in his almanac.
Borderlands	2012	Borderlands 2	Mister Torgue High-Five Flexington	Bisexual	It is alluded in Tiny Tina's Assault on Dragon Keep that Mr. Torgue is bisexual. This was confirmed via an interview.
Borderlands	2014	Borderlands: The Pre-Sequel	Rose and Gabby	Lesbian	During the Recruitment Drive mission in the Triton area, a character named Rose talks about her ex, Gabby.
Borderlands	2014	Borderlands: The Pre-Sequel	Athena and Janey Springs	Lesbian	In Borderlands: The Pre-Sequel (2014), the playable character Athena and the supporting character Janey Springs are lesbian. Janey repeatedly flirts with Athena, causing her to become embarrassed. Their relationship is confirmed later in a conversation where Athena implies that she "hit that" (referring to Janey) by giving a high five to Tiny Tina, even though Athena is initially defensive about talking about it. In the DLC Claptastic Voyage (2015), it is shown that Athena and Janey moved together to Hollow Point, a subterranean city on Pandora. In the episodic adventure game Tales from the Borderlands (2014), Athena and Janey are in a relationship. Depending on the player's choices, a scene may be available where Janey kisses Athena on the cheek and refers to her as her girlfriend. Later in the game, there is an unmissable scene where Athena is interrupted by a call from Janey, once again referring to her as her girlfriend.
Borderlands	2014	Tales from the Borderlands	Athena and Janey Springs	Lesbian	
Borderlands	2019	Borderlands 3	FL4K	Non-binary	FL4K is shown to use gender-neutral pronouns, and has a pin on the collar of their coat that has the number 2 in binary crossed out as well as the non-binary flag colors, referencing their gender identity.
Borderlands	2019	Borderlands 3	Wainwright Jakobs	Gay	The DLC pack Guns, Love, and Tentacles is about the marriage of Sir Hammerlock and Wainwright Jakobs.
Danganronpa	2012	Danganronpa 2: Goodbye Despair	Nagito Komaeda / Servant	Gay	Most notably, during the last dialogue lines of Nagito Komaeda's fifth free time event, he attempts to confess his love to Hajime Hinata, but ends up changing his wording at the last minute. However, this is only evident in the original Japanese version of the game. Near the end of Danganronpa Another Episode: Ultra Despair Girls, there is an animated scene where Servant (Nagito Komaeda) reveals to Monaca Towa that he both loves and hates Junko Enoshima more than anyone else, however it's implicit these conflicting feelings were the result of Junko's manipulation or brainwashing, and his true feelings are that of absolute enmity towards her. Besides Junko Enoshima, he displays no interest in the girls, not even being flustered when he falls directly under Mikan Tsumiki's skirt in the OVA special, in which it's stated he only has bad luck instead of his regular bad luck-good luck cycle, implying that this is a bad-luck scenario for him.
Danganronpa	2012	Danganronpa 2: Goodbye Despair	Teruteru Hanamura	Bisexual	Teruteru makes several suggestive comments about the bodies of both his male and female classmates and his interest in them, stating that "[m]y tastes are pretty open." During the last of his free time events with Hajime Hinata, he questions whether Hajime has "awakened" yet before attempting to drug him.
Danganronpa	2017	Danganronpa V3: Killing Harmony	Shuichi Saihara	Bisexual	During his Love Suite events, Shuichi explicitly engages in romantic and sexual scenarios with both male and female partners. During his Free Time Events with Kaito Momota, Shuichi states that "only someone like him could tell me what I need to hear" before becoming flustered over having romantic thoughts about him.
Danganronpa	2017	Danganronpa V3: Killing Harmony	Tenko Chabashira	Lesbian	In the character's official English profile, it is stated that compliments from women will "make her heart aflutter", whereas the same compliments from men will result in them "getting thrown across the room".
Danganronpa	2017	Danganronpa V3: Killing Harmony	Kokichi Oma	Pansexual or bisexual	Kokichi tends to display romantic dialogues with many different characters in both canonical and bonus modes, showing no gender differences as he does so. He seems to have fun calling Miu Iruma sexual names, and had more or less joked about having a crush on Himiko Yumeno in Chapters 2 and 5. He expresses romantic interest towards Shuichi, claiming his objective during their Free Time events was to "steal [his] heart". When Shuichi leaves the Neo World Program after refusing Kokichi's attempts to cooperate, Kokichi mutters to himself that he won't give up, because he found "someone he came to like". During the pair's Love Suite event, Shuichi himself notes that he's not a different person in Kokichi's ideal lover fantasy. Kokichi has also shown interest in Kaede Akamatsu, often flirting with her and claiming he thought "they were of one heart and soul". He says he "really cares about" Kaede and states that "he was thinking about her the whole time". He offers Kaede to join his criminal organization, as he wishes to "rule the world and set it on fire with her". After witnessing her death, he called her his "beloved Kaede".
Cho Aniki	1992	Chō Aniki: Bakuretsu Rantō-hen	Adon	Gay	Although the franchise constantly uses exaggerated, bodybuilding-influenced homoerotic imagery for humorous purposes, Adon is one of the few characters who has been confirmed to be homosexual in supplementary materials (as most of the main characters have canonical heterosexual orientations).
Darkstalkers	1994	First appearance: Darkstalkers: The Night Warriors; See also Morrigan Aensland § Appearances.	Morrigan Aensland	Bisexual	Morrigan is bisexual.
Dishonored	2016	Dishonored 2	Aramis Stilton	Gay	Aramis Stilton is a possible ally in Dishonored 2. His relationship with the previous Duke of Serkonas, Theodanis, is referenced throughout the game as being particularly close, and he was confirmed to be "openly gay" by director Harvey Smith on stream; with Theodanis being described as "his one true love".
Dishonored	2016	Dishonored 2	Mindy Blanchard	Transgender woman	Mindy is a recurring character in Dishonored 2 who can act as either an ally or antagonist to the player depending on their actions. A number of interactions in the game hint at her being transgender, with the game's director, Harvey Smith, later confirming it on stream after players picked up on the clues.
Dishonored	2017	Dishonored: Death of the Outsider	Billie Lurk / Meagan Foster	Bisexual	Billie first appears in the DLC for the original Dishonored before appearing as Meagan in the sequel, and finally being the player character in Death of the Outsider. In her second appearance, as 'Meagan Foster' she reveals through some of her audio logs, that she is bisexual, heard stating she has "loved many women, and even a couple of men".
Dragon Age	2009	Dragon Age: Origins	Zevran Arainai	Bisexual	Zevran, Isabela, and Leliana are three of The Walden's companions who express romantic interest without regard to The Walden's gender.
Dragon Age	2009	Dragon Age: Origins	Isabela	Bisexual	Zevran, Isabela, and Leliana are three of The Walden's companions who express romantic interest without regard to The Walden's gender.
Dragon Age	2009	Dragon Age: Origins	Leliana	Bisexual	Zevran, Isabela, and Leliana are three of The Walden's companions who express romantic interest without regard to The Walden's gender.
Dragon Age	2009	Dragon Age: Origins	Male and female prostitutes	Bisexual	The player can sleep with male or female prostitutes regardless of The Warden's gender in Brothels.
Dragon Age	2010	Dragon Age II	Anders, Fenris, Isabela, and Merrill	Bisexual	Anders, Fenris, Isabela, and Merrill are four of Hawke's companions who express romantic interest without regard to Hawke's gender.
Dragon Age	2010	Dragon Age II	Male and female prostitutes	Bisexual	The player can sleep with male or female prostitutes regardless of Hawke's gender. The prostitute Serendipity, though intended by writer Mary Kirby to be a male crossdresser and not a transgender woman, was read by many players as the latter. BioWare received criticism for Serendipity's portrayal, which inspired more thoughtful creation of two new transgender characters in subsequent installments.
Dragon Age	2010	Dragon Age II	Serendipity	Bisexual	The player can sleep with male or female prostitutes regardless of Hawke's gender. The prostitute Serendipity, though intended by writer Mary Kirby to be a male crossdresser and not a transgender woman, was read by many players as the latter. BioWare received criticism for Serendipity's portrayal, which inspired more thoughtful creation of two new transgender characters in subsequent installments.
Dragon Age	2010	Dragon Age II	Zevran Arainai	Bisexual	Zevran Arainai, a bisexual character from the first game, makes a cameo appearance and propositions Hawke and/or Isabela.
Dragon Age	2010	Dragon Age II	Cyril de Montfort	Bisexual	In the DLC Mark of the Assassin (2011), Hawke attends a hunting party hosted by Duke Prosper de Montfort of Orlais, and Hawke can flirt with the duke's son Cyril regardless of Hawke's gender.
Dragon Age	2010	Dragon Age II	Karl Thekla	Gay	He is the ex-lover of Anders.
Dragon Age	2014	Dragon Age: Inquisition	Sera and Dagna	Lesbian	Sera, a female elven archer, is gay and thus is only available as a romance option if the player picks a female character; the two of them can also get married in the DLC Trespasser (2015), the first confirmed same-gender marriage in the franchise. If Sera is not romanced, she will enter a relationship with a female dwarf named Dagna.
Dragon Age	2014	Dragon Age: Inquisition	Dorian Pavus	Gay	Dorian Pavus is a gay male mage who can be romanced by male player characters. Dorian's upbeat personality hides a dark family secret relating to his sexual orientation. The Iron Bull, a male qunari warrior, is openly pansexual and can be romanced by male and female player characters. If neither Dorian nor Iron Bull are romanced, then they can optionally enter a relationship.
Dragon Age	2014	Dragon Age: Inquisition	Iron Bull	Pansexual	Dorian Pavus is a gay male mage who can be romanced by male player characters. Dorian's upbeat personality hides a dark family secret relating to his sexual orientation. The Iron Bull, a male qunari warrior, is openly pansexual and can be romanced by male and female player characters. If neither Dorian nor Iron Bull are romanced, then they can optionally enter a relationship.
Dragon Age	2014	Dragon Age: Inquisition	Josephine Montilyet	Bisexual	The Inquisition's chief diplomat, Josephine Montilyet, is bisexual and can be romanced by male and female player characters. She is also voiced by queer actress Allegra Clark.
Dragon Age	2014	Dragon Age: Inquisition	Lace Harding	Pansexual	An "unofficial" romance option for an Inquisitor of either gender is the dwarven scout Lace Harding. Though her "romance" consists entirely of flirtatious dialogue with no additional cutscenes in the base game, the Trespasser DLC reveals the Inquisitor went on a date with her if they weren't already in a relationship and have flirted with her at every opportunity. She later became a romance option in Dragon Age: The Veilguard.
Dragon Age	2014	Dragon Age: Inquisition	Cremisius "Krem" Aclassi	Trans man	Cremisius Aclassi, a transgender man known mostly by his nickname Krem, is a member of the Bull's Chargers mercenary company. He serves as the Iron Bull's lieutenant.
Dragon Age	2014	Dragon Age: Inquisition	Empress Celene of Orlais and Briala	Lesbian	Empress Celene of Orlais, whose potential assassination is a critical plot point in the game, was formerly in a relationship with her spymaster, the female elf Briala. While the two are separated (and at war) as of the events of the game, the Inquisitor can facilitate their reconciliation. Their relationship was originally documented in the tie-in novel Dragon Age: The Masked Empire.
Dragon Age	2014	Dragon Age: Inquisition	Leliana	Bisexual	The game sees the return of the established bisexual character Leliana, although she is not a romance option.
Dragon Age	2014	Dragon Age: Inquisition	Cyril de Montfort / Duke de Montfort	Bisexual	The bisexual character Cyril de Montfort, previously seen in Dragon Age II, appears as the new Duke de Montfort in the Winter Palace during the Wicked Eyes and Wicked Hearts quest and cameo in the Trespasser DLC.
Dragon Age	2014	Dragon Age: Inquisition	Other NPCs	Lesbian, gay	Other NPCs encountered throughout the world are shown to be in same-gender relationships, such as Inquisition scout Ritts and the apostate mage Eldredda in the Hinterlands, Commander Jehan and Chevalier Fabienne in the Exalted Plains, and two unnamed Orlesian noblemen at the Winter Palace (one of whom accuses the other of flirting with Duke Cyril).
Dragon Age	2014	Dragon Age: Inquisition	Historical figures	Various	Discoverable Codex entries reveal that certain historical figures were known to have been in same-gender relationships, including the "barbarian" Avvar matriarch Tyrdda Bright-Axe (subject of an epic poem in which her female elven lover plays a major role), and Arl Jacen Guerrin, who built a villa in the Hinterlands for his lover, Ser Corram the Bard, centuries earlier.
Dragon Age	2014	Dragon Age: Inquisition	Tie-in material characters	Various	Other characters who appear or are mentioned in-game have their sexual or gender identity addressed in tie-in material: The female elven spy Charter, who is depicted in the Dragon Age: Magekiller comic book in a relationship with a woman; also, Maevaris Tilani is a transgender woman who first appeared in the comic book Dragon Age: Those Who Speak as a cousin-by-marriage of Varric Tethras, while in the game she is mentioned as a friend and political ally of Dorian's, though she does not physically appear except in Dorian's epilogue slides at the end of the Trespasser DLC.
Dragon Age	2024	Dragon Age: The Veilguard	Rook (player character)	Queer (optional)	Players can select Rook's pronouns (she/her, he/him, and they/them are all options), sexual characteristics, and gender separately. They can also enter relationships with other characters regardless of gender, allowing the character's sexuality and gender identity to be entirely up to the player. In addition, genderfluid actor Erika Ishii provides one of Rook's in-game voice options.
Dragon Age	2024	Dragon Age: The Veilguard	Taash	Non-binary and pansexual	Played by non-binary actor Jin Maley and written by non-binary pansexual writer Trick Weekes.
Dragon Age	2024	Dragon Age: The Veilguard	Davrin	Pansexual	Neve is played by lesbian actress Jessica Clark.
Dragon Age	2024	Dragon Age: The Veilguard	Lucanis Dellamorte	Pansexual	Neve is played by lesbian actress Jessica Clark.
Dragon Age	2024	Dragon Age: The Veilguard	Neve Gallus	Pansexual	Neve is played by lesbian actress Jessica Clark.
Dragon Age	2024	Dragon Age: The Veilguard	Lace Harding	Pansexual	Neve is played by lesbian actress Jessica Clark.
Dragon Age	2024	Dragon Age: The Veilguard	Bellara Lutare	Pansexual	Neve is played by lesbian actress Jessica Clark.
Dragon Age	2024	Dragon Age: The Veilguard	Emmrich Volkarin	Pansexual	Neve is played by lesbian actress Jessica Clark.
Dragon Age	2024	Dragon Age: The Veilguard	Flynn	Non-binary	

=== F–J ===
Series	Year	Game	Character(s)	Classification	Notes
Fallout	1998	Fallout 2	Player character	Lesbian, gay, or bisexual	The player character can be either male or female. Miria and Davin are siblings that the player may have sex with and marry one of them, regardless of their gender. The ability to marry either Miria or Davin irrespective of the player's gender in a mainstream game (compared to Great Greed's obscurity) tends to result in Fallout 2 being named as the first game to feature a same-sex marriage. The player character can also have sex with Leslie Anne Bishop regardless of gender.
Fallout	1998	Fallout 2	Miria	Bisexual woman	The player character can be either male or female. Miria and Davin are siblings that the player may have sex with and marry one of them, regardless of their gender. The ability to marry either Miria or Davin irrespective of the player's gender in a mainstream game (compared to Great Greed's obscurity) tends to result in Fallout 2 being named as the first game to feature a same-sex marriage. The player character can also have sex with Leslie Anne Bishop regardless of gender.
Fallout	1998	Fallout 2	Davin	Bisexual man	The player character can be either male or female. Miria and Davin are siblings that the player may have sex with and marry one of them, regardless of their gender. The ability to marry either Miria or Davin irrespective of the player's gender in a mainstream game (compared to Great Greed's obscurity) tends to result in Fallout 2 being named as the first game to feature a same-sex marriage. The player character can also have sex with Leslie Anne Bishop regardless of gender.
Fallout	1998	Fallout 2	Leslie Anne Bishop	Bisexual woman	The player character can be either male or female. Miria and Davin are siblings that the player may have sex with and marry one of them, regardless of their gender. The ability to marry either Miria or Davin irrespective of the player's gender in a mainstream game (compared to Great Greed's obscurity) tends to result in Fallout 2 being named as the first game to feature a same-sex marriage. The player character can also have sex with Leslie Anne Bishop regardless of gender.
Fallout	2010	Fallout: New Vegas	Courier	Straight, gay, lesbian, or bisexual (optional)	The main character, the unnamed Courier, can be chosen as male, with the perk (character trait) Confirmed Bachelor, giving him several advantages with other gay male NPCs (and, following the stereotype of gay people as more understanding and perceptive about emotions, grant him the ability to better understand the plight of the otherwise mute companion Christine). This perk has a female equivalent, the Cherchez la femme perk. Additionally, the male Courier can pick both Lady Killer (the "straight" perk) and Confirmed Bachelor, making them optionally bisexual, as with the female Courier with Black Widow and Cherchez la femme. According to Josh Sawyer, he was the one who came up with this implementation.
Fallout	2010	Fallout: New Vegas	Arcade Gannon	Gay	Arcade Gannon is openly gay, briefly discussing his orientation.
Fallout	2010	Fallout: New Vegas	Veronica Santangelo	Lesbian	Veronica is an open lesbian. If asked about her past, she will tell of a romance with fellow Brotherhood of Steel member Christine Royce. However, this relationship was frowned on, and the two were separated. She will also lightly flirt with a female Courier and gently turn down potential flirtations from a male.
Fallout	2010	Fallout: New Vegas	Rose of Sharon Cassidy	Queer	Cassidy treats sex very casually and will often sleep with men who take her fancy. If flirted with by a female Courier, she will admit that, if drunk enough, she may be willing to share her bed with a woman, and though it isn't her preference, she has no problems with people who are homosexual.
Fallout	2010	Fallout: New Vegas	Corporal Betsy	Lesbian	Another NPC, Corporal Betsy, a sharpshooter for the NCR, is openly gay and will flirt with a female Courier that has high enough charisma.
Fallout	2015	Fallout 4	Sole Survivor	Bisexual (optional)	The player character, "Sole Survivor", starts in a relationship with a wife (if the player chooses to be male) or a husband (if the player chooses to be female). Showing the primary character is at least straight, however, the "Sole Survivor" can romance their companions, regardless of their sex.
Final Fantasy	2000	Final Fantasy IX	Quina Quen	Agender or genderqueer or non-binary	Quina Quen is a non-human playable character. Quina is referred to with non-gendered terms in the Japanese version. In the English version, Quina is referred to using the pronouns "his" and "him," but also by "s/he". During gameplay, Quina cannot equip woman-only items, and is not affected by Zidane's "Protect Girls" ability.
Final Fantasy	2020	Final Fantasy VII Remake	Andrea Rhodea	Queer	Andrea Rhodea, the owner of the Honeybee Inn in Midgar's red light district, is presented as a character who does not conform to gender norms.
Final Fantasy	2023	Final Fantasy XVI	Dion Lesage	Gay	Dion Lesage is the leader of the Holy Order of The Knights Dragoon, and his lover is his second-in-command Sir Terrance.
Final Fantasy	2023	Final Fantasy XVI	Sir Terrance	Gay	Dion Lesage is the leader of the Holy Order of The Knights Dragoon, and his lover is his second-in-command Sir Terrance.
Final Fantasy	2023	Final Fantasy XVI	Unnamed soldier and his lover	Gay	An unnamed male non-player character is in a romantic relationship with another man.
Final Fight and Street Fighter	1989	First appearance: Final Fight	Poison	Trans woman	Poison is introduced in Final Fight (1989), where she is either a pre-op or post-op trans woman, depending on the region where the game was released. One of Poison's win quotes, "Being gossiped about is proof of my popularity!" seemingly alludes to the controversy and ambiguity surrounding her gender identity.
Final Fight and Street Fighter	2023	Street Fighter 6	Marisa	Bisexual	Marisa is the first openly bisexual and polyamorous playable character in the series.
Final Fight and Street Fighter	2023	Street Fighter 6	Eternity	Non-binary	Eternity is the emcee of Battle Hub mode, and not a playable character.
Fire Emblem	2003	Fire Emblem: The Blazing Blade	Limstella	Non-binary	They are a genderless, non-human character, and use they/them pronouns in the English version of Fire Emblem Heroes.
Fire Emblem	2007	Fire Emblem: Radiant Dawn	Heather	Lesbian	Heather is a character that the player can get on their team. She is implied to be a lesbian and claims to have joined the army to "meet cute girls".
Fire Emblem	2016	Fire Emblem Fates	Soleil	Lesbian or bisexual or sexually fluid	Soleil is romantically interested in women, and gets so nervous and weak-kneed around women she finds attractive that she comes off as strange to them or falls over. She talks to the (male) protagonist about wanting to overcome her fearfulness, and the protagonist spikes her drink with a substance that makes her see men as women and vice versa to try and give her a chance to practice interacting with women. She falls in love with the protagonist while under the influence of the substance, and remains in love with him as a man after the effect wears off. This plot was considered controversial, with some comparing it to gay conversion therapy. In response, Nintendo removed parts of it from the North American and European versions of the game.
Fire Emblem	2016	Fire Emblem Fates	Niles	Bisexual	A character available on the Conquest and Revelation routes, he is the only male character that the player can S-Rank (a rank that enters the two characters into a romantic relationship) if their avatar character (whose default name is Corrin) is also male.
Fire Emblem	2016	Fire Emblem Fates	Rhajat	Bisexual	Available only if Hayato marries someone on the Birthright or Revelation routes, she is the only same-sex romantic option the female player character has. She is based on a character introduced in Fire Emblem Awakening called Tharja, who also expressed romantic interest in the player character of that game, but the avatar could only ever romance her as a male.
Fire Emblem	2016	Fire Emblem Fates	Player character	Bisexual	They can romance Niles and Rhajat (who are bisexual characters) regardless of the gender the player assigns them.
Fire Emblem	2017	Fire Emblem Echoes: Shadows of Valentia	Leon	Gay	Leon asks Kamui if he wants to be hit on by Leon. Leon then states that Kamui is not his type and confesses his love to another male comrade, Valbar. He also describes his past lover as a man.
Fire Emblem	2019	Fire Emblem: Three Houses	Byleth Eisner	Bisexual	Byleth, the player character of the game, can be male or female. Only some of Byleth's romance options are same-gender. The women that female Byleth can marry are Edelgard, Dorothea, Mercedes, Rhea, and Sothis. The men that male Byleth can marry are Lindhardt, Jeritza, and Yuri.
Fire Emblem	2019	Fire Emblem: Three Houses	Edelgard von Hresvelg	Bisexual	Byleth, the player character of the game, can be male or female. Only some of Byleth's romance options are same-gender. The women that female Byleth can marry are Edelgard, Dorothea, Mercedes, Rhea, and Sothis. The men that male Byleth can marry are Lindhardt, Jeritza, and Yuri.
Fire Emblem	2019	Fire Emblem: Three Houses	Mercedes von Martrtiz	Bisexual	Byleth, the player character of the game, can be male or female. Only some of Byleth's romance options are same-gender. The women that female Byleth can marry are Edelgard, Dorothea, Mercedes, Rhea, and Sothis. The men that male Byleth can marry are Lindhardt, Jeritza, and Yuri.
Fire Emblem	2019	Fire Emblem: Three Houses	Rhea	Bisexual	Byleth, the player character of the game, can be male or female. Only some of Byleth's romance options are same-gender. The women that female Byleth can marry are Edelgard, Dorothea, Mercedes, Rhea, and Sothis. The men that male Byleth can marry are Lindhardt, Jeritza, and Yuri.
Fire Emblem	2019	Fire Emblem: Three Houses	Sothis	Bisexual	Byleth, the player character of the game, can be male or female. Only some of Byleth's romance options are same-gender. The women that female Byleth can marry are Edelgard, Dorothea, Mercedes, Rhea, and Sothis. The men that male Byleth can marry are Lindhardt, Jeritza, and Yuri.
Fire Emblem	2019	Fire Emblem: Three Houses	Linhardt von Hevring	Bisexual	Byleth, the player character of the game, can be male or female. Only some of Byleth's romance options are same-gender. The women that female Byleth can marry are Edelgard, Dorothea, Mercedes, Rhea, and Sothis. The men that male Byleth can marry are Lindhardt, Jeritza, and Yuri.
Fire Emblem	2019	Fire Emblem: Three Houses	Dorothea Arnault	Bisexual	In addition to being able to marry Byleth regardless of gender, she also mentions in conversation that she'd love to have either a husband or a wife.
Fire Emblem	2019	Fire Emblem: Three Houses	Jeritza von Hrym	Bisexual	Only able to be recruited on the Crimson Flower route. While he was present in the game at launch, he was unable to be recruited until the game's Version 1.1.0 update. He can marry Byleth regardless of their gender.
Fire Emblem	2019	Fire Emblem: Three Houses	Yuri Leclerc	Bisexual	Leader of the Ashen Wolves house, and only available if the Cindered Shadows DLC has been purchased. He can marry Byleth regardless of their gender.
Fire Emblem	2023	Fire Emblem Engage	Player character	Bisexual	The player character can give anyone recruited into their army the Pact Ring if they have an A support with them. In the Japanese version of the game, the player character enters a relationship with the chosen character in the ensuing conversation (excluding their sister), but in the game's English release, several of these interactions were made platonic.
Fire Emblem	2023	Fire Emblem Engage	Various characters	Bisexual	The player character can give anyone recruited into their army the Pact Ring if they have an A support with them. In the Japanese version of the game, the player character enters a relationship with the chosen character in the ensuing conversation (excluding their sister), but in the game's English release, several of these interactions were made platonic.
Grand Theft Auto	2005	Grand Theft Auto: Liberty City Stories	Reni Wassulmaier	Genderqueer	Reni Wassulmaier is an adult film director. She is assigned female at birth. She undergoes four sex surgeries: female-to-male, then male-to-female, then female-to-male again, then male-to-female again. She is introduced in Grand Theft Auto: Liberty City Stories (2005), as a female radio DJ. In between songs, she drops hints about previously being male.
Grand Theft Auto	2006	Grand Theft Auto: Vice City Stories	Reni Wassulmaier	Genderqueer	In the prequel Grand Theft Auto: Vice City Stories (2006), set 14 years before, she already had the first three sex changes, and the objective for one mission, titled "So Long Schlong", is to take Reni to the hospital for her fourth sex change.
Grand Theft Auto	2009	Grand Theft Auto: The Ballad of Gay Tony	Tony "Gay Tony" Prince	Gay	
Grand Theft Auto	2009	Grand Theft Auto: The Ballad of Gay Tony	Evan Moss	Gay	
Grand Theft Auto	2013	Grand Theft Auto V	Trevor Philips	Pansexual	The character's motion capture actor stated that "If [Trevor is] attracted to someone or something, he'll have sex with that, be it an object or a woman or man."

=== K–N ===
Series	Year	Game	Character(s)	Classification	Notes
Kingdom Come: Deliverance	2018	Kingdom Come: Deliverance	Erik	Gay	Erik and Toth are in a relationship with each other.
Kingdom Come: Deliverance	2018	Kingdom Come: Deliverance	Istvan Toth	Gay	Erik and Toth are in a relationship with each other.
Kingdom Come: Deliverance	2018	Kingdom Come: Deliverance	Lucas (Canute)	Gay	A minor non-playable character encountered in Sasau Monastery. He was forced to become a monk by his family due to his sexuality.
Kingdom Come: Deliverance	2025	Kingdom Come: Deliverance II	Henry of Skalitz	Bisexual	Kingdom Come: Deliverance II allows Henry to initiate a romance with Hans Capon through a series of dialogue choices. Henry can also have a brief romantic encounter with another male character, Black Bartosch, in addition to a number of female romance options.
Kingdom Come: Deliverance	2025	Kingdom Come: Deliverance II	Hans Capon	Bisexual	Kingdom Come: Deliverance II allows Henry to initiate a romance with Hans Capon through a series of dialogue choices. Henry can also have a brief romantic encounter with another male character, Black Bartosch, in addition to a number of female romance options.
The King of Fighters	1994	First appearance: The King of Fighters '94	Mature	Bisexual	Mature, one of the series' recurring characters, is confirmed to be bisexual.
Life is Strange	2015	Life is Strange	Max Caulfield	Bisexual	Life Is Strange is experienced from Max's perspective. The development of Max and Chloe's relationship is the main plot of the game, and they can end up romantically. At different points in the game, Max may have the choice to kiss her male friend, Warren (who has a crush on Max), and/or Chloe. If she kisses both of them, she regards them as two people she truly cares about.
Life is Strange	2015	Life is Strange	Chloe Price	Sapphic	She mentions being in love with Rachel and can be in a romantic relationship with Max. However, she also mentions having a "boy toy phase", has condoms in her wallet, and flirts with Mark Jefferson. Chloe's sexuality was never confirmed.
Life is Strange	2017	Life is Strange: Before the Storm	Chloe Price	Sapphic	In Before the Storm Chloe has the choice to kiss Rachel, whom she admits to a crush on in the original game, and, despite previous relations with a boy named Elliot, makes references to how Rachel "saved her" from boys.
Life is Strange	2017	Life is Strange: Before the Storm	Rachel Amber	Bisexual	Depending on the player's actions, Rachel may open up and reveal that she reciprocates Chloe's romantic feelings and may even kiss her later on. She is shown to be romantically attracted to Chloe, and has had relationships with Mark Jefferson and Frank Bowers.
Life is Strange	2017	Life is Strange: Before the Storm	Steph Gingrich	Lesbian	Steph has a crush on Rachel and can mention it to Chloe in episode 2. Her voice actress, Katy Bentz, later confirmed during a Reddit AMA that Steph is a lesbian.
Life is Strange	2018	Life is Strange 2	Sean Diaz	Bisexual	During Episode 3 "Wastelands" Sean can pursue either Cassidy or Finn romantically. If Sean begins a relationship with either of them, they can be seen with Sean in the "Parting Ways" ending.
Life is Strange	2018	Life is Strange 2	Finn McNamara	Pansexual	Players meet Finn during Episode 3, with interactions with him implying his attraction to Sean, and the two can become romantically involved.
Life is Strange	2018	Life is Strange 2	Jacob "Jake" Hackerman	Gay	During Episode 3, Jake is met by Sean and Daniel Diaz at a campsite in Humboldt County, California. It is later revealed in Episode 4 that he is gay, and his old community had been putting him through gay conversion therapy, before subsequently kicking him out.
Life is Strange	2018	Life is Strange 2	Penny	Gay or bisexual	Penny mentions the disappearance of Arthur "Jinx" Lee, a man he met and fell in love with.
Life is Strange	2018	Life is Strange 2	Arthur and Stanley Petersen	Gay	Arthur and Stanley are a married couple whom Sean and Daniel meet in episode 5.
Life is Strange	2021	Life is Strange: True Colors	Alex Chen	Bisexual	Alex is canonically bisexual and can enter a romantic relationship with Steph Gingrich or Ryan Lucan.
Life is Strange	2024	Life Is Strange: Double Exposure	Max Caulfield	Bisexual	Max, the protagonist from Life Is Strange, is able to romance Vinh and Amanda. If Chloe was saved in the first game, the player is given the option to decide whether or not she and Max had a romantic relationship, but it is revealed that they broke up before the events of the game.
Life is Strange	2024	Life Is Strange: Double Exposure	Vinh Lang	Bisexual	Max, the protagonist from Life Is Strange, is able to romance Vinh and Amanda. If Chloe was saved in the first game, the player is given the option to decide whether or not she and Max had a romantic relationship, but it is revealed that they broke up before the events of the game.
Life is Strange	2024	Life Is Strange: Double Exposure	Moses Murphy	Bisexual	Max, the protagonist from Life Is Strange, is able to romance Vinh and Amanda. If Chloe was saved in the first game, the player is given the option to decide whether or not she and Max had a romantic relationship, but it is revealed that they broke up before the events of the game.
Life is Strange	2024	Life Is Strange: Double Exposure	Gwen Hunter	Trans woman	Max, the protagonist from Life Is Strange, is able to romance Vinh and Amanda. If Chloe was saved in the first game, the player is given the option to decide whether or not she and Max had a romantic relationship, but it is revealed that they broke up before the events of the game.
Life is Strange	2024	Life Is Strange: Double Exposure		Gay	Max, the protagonist from Life Is Strange, is able to romance Vinh and Amanda. If Chloe was saved in the first game, the player is given the option to decide whether or not she and Max had a romantic relationship, but it is revealed that they broke up before the events of the game.
Life is Strange	2024	Life Is Strange: Double Exposure	Reggie Kagan	Gay	Max, the protagonist from Life Is Strange, is able to romance Vinh and Amanda. If Chloe was saved in the first game, the player is given the option to decide whether or not she and Max had a romantic relationship, but it is revealed that they broke up before the events of the game.
Life is Strange	2024	Life Is Strange: Double Exposure	Amanda Thomas	Lesbian	Max, the protagonist from Life Is Strange, is able to romance Vinh and Amanda. If Chloe was saved in the first game, the player is given the option to decide whether or not she and Max had a romantic relationship, but it is revealed that they broke up before the events of the game.
Magic: The Gathering	2015	Magic Duels	Aetherborn	Non-binary	The Aetherborn are a short-lived genderless species born from the process of producing an energy source called Aether. Some Aetherborn, like Yahenni and Gonti, take on genders and pronouns during their lives.
Magic: The Gathering	2015	Magic Duels	Gonti	Transmaculine	The Aetherborn are a short-lived genderless species born from the process of producing an energy source called Aether. Some Aetherborn, like Yahenni and Gonti, take on genders and pronouns during their lives.
Magic: The Gathering	2015	Magic Duels	Yahenni	Transfeminine	The Aetherborn are a short-lived genderless species born from the process of producing an energy source called Aether. Some Aetherborn, like Yahenni and Gonti, take on genders and pronouns during their lives.
Magic: The Gathering	2015	Magic Duels	Chandra Nalaar	Bisexual	Nissa and Chandra are in a relationship. Chandra has also previously expressed attraction to the knight, Adeline. Their relationship was implied in stories released since at least 2016, and was confirmed in the March of the Machine story. They were also featured in an in-universe Pride Parade on the plane of Kaladesh for Magic's 2022 Pride celebrations.
Magic: The Gathering	2015	Magic Duels	Nissa Revane	Lesbian	Nissa and Chandra are in a relationship. Chandra has also previously expressed attraction to the knight, Adeline. Their relationship was implied in stories released since at least 2016, and was confirmed in the March of the Machine story. They were also featured in an in-universe Pride Parade on the plane of Kaladesh for Magic's 2022 Pride celebrations.
Magic: The Gathering	2015	Magic Duels	Oviya Pashiri	Lesbian	Oviya is an artificer on the plane of Kaladesh, working with the city's rebels after the death of her wife.
Magic: The Gathering	2015	Magic Duels	Saheeli Rai	Lesbian	Saheeli is an artificer from the plane of Kaladesh. She is in a relationship with fellow former Planeswalker Huatli. Their relationship was confirmed with the story "Note For a Stranger," released alongside Magic's 2022 Pride celebrations, which tells the story of their first date. They are also pictured embracing on one of the cards released for that event, and have had their relationship reinforced on cards released since.
Magic: The Gathering	2019	Magic: The Gathering Arena	Adeline	Lesbian	Adeline is a knight from the plane of Innistrad who shared a short-lived relationship with Chandra during their time together.
Magic: The Gathering	2019	Magic: The Gathering Arena	Alesha	Trans woman	Alesha is a warrior from the plane of Tarkir. Among her people, names are earned in glory and battle. At the age of 16 she earned her name and chose the name Alesha, after her grandmother. She is also featured in a card for Magic's 2022 Pride celebrations.
Magic: The Gathering	2019	Magic: The Gathering Arena	Alora	Aromantic and asexual	Alora is a halfling companion from the game Baldur's Gate, who was later featured on a card in the Magic: The Gathering set "Battle for Baldur's Gate". Her sexuality was confirmed by the set's narrative lead, Justice Geddes.
Magic: The Gathering	2019	Magic: The Gathering Arena	Ashiok	Non-binary	Ashiok is a Nightmare, capable of controlling and wielding dreams. Their gender is officially unspecified, if it's even known at all.
Magic: The Gathering	2019	Magic: The Gathering Arena	Astarion Ancunín	Pansexual	Astarion is a half-elf vampire rogue companion from the game Baldur's Gate 3 who is also featured on a card in the Magic: The Gathering set "Battle for Baldur's Gate". His sexuality was confirmed by the set's narrative lead, Justice Geddes.
Magic: The Gathering	2019	Magic: The Gathering Arena	Delney	Non-binary	Delney is a Ravnican youth occasionally working with the city's detectives. They use they/them pronouns.
Magic: The Gathering	2019	Magic: The Gathering Arena	Errant	Lesbian	Errant is a graffiti artist working for the Maestros on the plane of New Capenna, alongside her wife, Parnesse.
Magic: The Gathering	2019	Magic: The Gathering Arena	Falkenrath Celebrants	Lesbian	An unnamed vampire couple attending the wedding of Edgar Markov and Olivia Voldaren.
Magic: The Gathering	2019	Magic: The Gathering Arena	Fleeting Spirit	Gay	After his partner cheated on and killed him, the cathar returned from the grave to take revenge on his former lover.
Magic: The Gathering	2019	Magic: The Gathering Arena	Gale Dekarios	Pansexual	Gale is a human wizard companion from the game Baldur's Gate 3 who is also featured on a card in the Magic: The Gathering set "Battle for Baldur's Gate". His sexuality was confirmed by the set's narrative lead, Justice Geddes.
Magic: The Gathering	2019	Magic: The Gathering Arena	Haktos	Gay	Haktos is a warrior from the plane of Theros. His 'lifelong partner', Perynes, is mentioned in Dungeons and Dragons source book "Mythic Odysseys of Theros", with the two being inspired by Achilles and Patroclus.
Magic: The Gathering	2019	Magic: The Gathering Arena	Halana and Alena	Lesbian	Halana and Alena are rangers from the plane of Innistrad, and partners in both life and work. Their relationship was confirmed in their first appearances in the 2020 Commander set.
Magic: The Gathering	2019	Magic: The Gathering Arena	Hallar	Non-binary	Hallar is an elf from the plane of Dominaria. Hallar uses genderless elvish pronouns and is referred to by they/them pronouns in English.
Magic: The Gathering	2019	Magic: The Gathering Arena	Heiko Yamazaki	Lesbian	Heiko is a samurai from the plane of Kamigawa. After an incident in her youth that left her cousin injured, she shunned her Imperial heritage and joined the anti-imperial 'Uprisers', where she met and fell in love with her partner, Chiye.
Magic: The Gathering	2019	Magic: The Gathering Arena	Huatli	Lesbian	Huatli is a warrior poet from the plane of Ixalan. She is in a relationship with fellow former Planeswalker Saheeli Rai. Their relationship was confirmed with the story "Note For a Stranger" released alongside Magic's 2022 Pride celebrations, which tells the story of their first date. They are pictured embracing on one of the cards released for that event, and have had their relationship reinforced on cards released since.
Magic: The Gathering	2019	Magic: The Gathering Arena	Karlach Cliffgate	Pansexual	Karlach is a tiefling barbarian companion from the game Baldur's Gate 3 who is also featured on a card in the Magic: The Gathering set "Battle for Baldur's Gate". Her sexuality was confirmed by the set's narrative lead, Justice Geddes. She is also played by non-binary actor, Samantha Béart.
Magic: The Gathering	2019	Magic: The Gathering Arena	Klement	Gay Trans man	Klement is a tiefling cleric from Baldur's Gate, who is represented on a card in the Arena exclusive set "Alchemy Horizons: Baldur's Gate". He was designed by the set's narrative lead, Justice Geddes, who confirmed his identity.
Magic: The Gathering	2019	Magic: The Gathering Arena	Korlessa	Lesbian	Korlessa is a dragonborn bard from Baldur's Gate, represented by a card in the set "Battle for Baldur's Gate". Her sexuality was confirmed by the set's narrative lead, Justice Geddes.
Magic: The Gathering	2019	Magic: The Gathering Arena	Lae'Zel	Pansexual	Lae'Zel is a githyanki fighter companion from the game Baldur's Gate 3 who is also featured on a card in the Magic: The Gathering set "Battle for Baldur's Gate". Her sexuality was confirmed by the set's narrative lead, Justice Geddes.
Magic: The Gathering	2019	Magic: The Gathering Arena	Lukamina	Lesbian	Lukamina is a human druid from Baldur's Gate, who is represented on a card in the Arena exclusive set "Alchemy Horizons: Baldur's Gate". She was designed by the set's narrative lead, Justice Geddes, who confirmed her sexuality.
Magic: The Gathering	2019	Magic: The Gathering Arena	Minthara Baenre	Pansexual	Minthara is a drow paladin companion from the game Baldur's Gate 3 who is also featured on a card in the Magic: The Gathering set "Battle for Baldur's Gate". Her sexuality was confirmed by the set's narrative lead, Justice Geddes.
Magic: The Gathering	2019	Magic: The Gathering Arena	Myrel	Non-binary	Myrel is a soldier from the plane of Dominaria. They use they/them pronouns.
Magic: The Gathering	2019	Magic: The Gathering Arena	Nassari	Non-binary	Nassari is an efreet shaman from the plane of Arcavios. They use they/them pronouns.
Magic: The Gathering	2019	Magic: The Gathering Arena	Niko Aris	Non-binary	Niko is a mage and athlete from the plane of Theros. They use they/them pronouns. They also feature on a card in Magic's 2022 Pride Celebrations.
Magic: The Gathering	2019	Magic: The Gathering Arena	Oji	Non-binary	Oji is a monk from Baldur's Gate. They are represented on a card in the set "Battle For Baldur's Gate". Their identity and pronouns were confirmed by the set's narrative lead, Justice Geddes.
Magic: The Gathering	2019	Magic: The Gathering Arena	Ral Zarek	Gay	Ral and Tomik are acting guild-masters for competing guilds on the plane of Ravnica. They opted to keep their relationship hidden to stave off accusations of conflicting interests, but their close relationship proved vital in uniting the guilds against a common threat. Once their relationship was exposed, the two married publicly, with their marriage featured on a card in Magic's 2022 Pride Celebrations.
Magic: The Gathering	2019	Magic: The Gathering Arena	Tomik Vrona	Gay	Ral and Tomik are acting guild-masters for competing guilds on the plane of Ravnica. They opted to keep their relationship hidden to stave off accusations of conflicting interests, but their close relationship proved vital in uniting the guilds against a common threat. Once their relationship was exposed, the two married publicly, with their marriage featured on a card in Magic's 2022 Pride Celebrations.
Magic: The Gathering	2019	Magic: The Gathering Arena	Rocco	Non-binary	Rocco is an elven chef for the Cabaretti on the plane of New Capenna. They use they/them pronouns.
Magic: The Gathering	2019	Magic: The Gathering Arena	Secret Rendezvous	Lesbian	The card depicts two students from rival colleges stealing away a moment alone together.
Magic: The Gathering	2019	Magic: The Gathering Arena	Shadowheart	Pansexual	Shadowheart is a half-elven cleric companion from the game Baldur's Gate 3 who is also featured on a card in the Magic: The Gathering set "Battle for Baldur's Gate". Her sexuality was confirmed by the set's narrative lead, Justice Geddes. She is also played by lesbian actress, Jennifer English.
Magic: The Gathering	2019	Magic: The Gathering Arena	Syr Joshua	Gay	Syr Joshua and Syr Saxon are a human knight couple from Eldraine. The two live and fight together, even while under the influence of the mind controlling curse the 'Wicked Slumber'.
Magic: The Gathering	2019	Magic: The Gathering Arena	Syr Saxon	Gay	Syr Joshua and Syr Saxon are a human knight couple from Eldraine. The two live and fight together, even while under the influence of the mind controlling curse the 'Wicked Slumber'.
Magic: The Gathering	2019	Magic: The Gathering Arena	Talion	Non-binary	Talion is a faerie lord from the plane of Eldraine. They use they/them pronouns.
Magic: The Gathering	2019	Magic: The Gathering Arena	The Scholar & The Knight	Lesbian	A couple from an Eldraine fairy tale of the same name.
Magic: The Gathering	2019	Magic: The Gathering Arena	Vadrik	Gay	Vadrik is a wizard and astronomer from the plane of Innistrad. His husband is a man named Hailin.
Magic: The Gathering	2019	Magic: The Gathering Arena	Vladimir and Godfrey	Gay	Vladimir and Godfrey were knights and lovers until Godfrey was killed by a vampire lord. The rage at losing Godfrey caused Vladimir to become a revenant, lashing out at the one who took his partner. The couple originate from the Dungeons and Dragons Campaign Curse of Strahd. The two are depicted on a shared card in the Arena exclusive set "Alchemy Horizons: Baldur's Gate".
Magic: The Gathering	2019	Magic: The Gathering Arena	Will Kenrith	Bisexual	Will is a wizard from the plane of Eldraine. Throughout the 'Throne of Eldraine' novel, and the Magic: The Gathering stories, he is repeatedly shown and stated to have crushes on various characters, both male and female, including his childhood friends, Cerise and Titus. He was also featured on the official Magic The Gathering Pride 2023 playmat.
Magic: The Gathering	2019	Magic: The Gathering Arena	Wyll Ravengard	Pansexual	Wyll is a human warlock companion from the game Baldur's Gate 3 who is also featured on a card in the Magic: The Gathering set "Battle for Baldur's Gate". His sexuality was confirmed by the set's narrative lead, Justice Geddes.
Magic: The Gathering	2019	Magic: The Gathering Arena	Yuma	Trans man	Yuma is a human ranger, originally from New Capenna. As a small-time gangster, Yuma raised enough to medically transition, but eventually, he and his gang became overwhelmed with debt. To escape, he fled to the plane of Thunder Junction with the gang's remaining gold, where he found a new life caring for an orphaned cactusfolk, a sentient plant creature native to the plane. His identity is confirmed in his cover story, and by the game's head designer, Mark Rosewater.
Mario	1985	Super Mario Bros.	Toad	Agender	In a 2014 interview with Shigeru Miyamoto, he revealed that Toads were designed without a specific gender in mind. Nintendo director Koichi Hayashida who produced Captain Toad: Treasure Tracker, explained that the appearance of a Toad does not represent his gender, stating that it has never been decided what gender could be associated with any Toad. He clarifies later that the gender of the Toads will remain a mystery.
Mario	1988	Super Mario Bros. 2	Birdo	Trans woman	In the first-edition manual for the North American release of the game, Birdo is referred to as a "male who believes that he is a female" and would rather be called "Birdetta", making her the first transgender character for Nintendo. In the Japanese version, Birdo is referred as "Catherine" where it is also stated that the character is a man who wishes to be a woman. In later printings, mention of Birdo being male was omitted, and further not included in most later games with the character.
Mario	2004	Paper Mario: The Thousand-Year Door	Vivian	Trans woman	In the original Japanese version, Vivian is a transgender woman. When Paper Mario: The Thousand-Year Door was localized to English and German, Vivian's status as a trans woman was not mentioned. In non-English/German localizations of the game, Vivian is still recognized as transgender. In the remake's English localization, she is presented as a transgender woman. The remake was nominated for a GLAAD Award for Outstanding Video Game in 2025.
Mass Effect	2007	Mass Effect	Commander Shepard	Lesbian or bisexual	Commander Shepard is the main character in Mass Effect, and the player may choose to play as either male or female. A female Commander Shepard has two possible love interests: the male human Kaidan Alenko, and the female appearing asari Liara T'Soni. Shepard may also optionally have a sexual encounter with the Asari Consort as a reward for completing their side quest.
Mass Effect	2007	Mass Effect	Liara T'Soni	Genderqueer and pansexual	Dr. Liara T'Soni is an Asari, a single-gendered species that has traditionally feminine traits but reproduces by means other than sexual reproduction. There is an option for a subplot romance and sexual encounter with her, regardless of the gender of Commander Shepard, the player character.
Mass Effect	2010	Mass Effect 2	Samara and Morinth	Genderqueer and pansexual	Commander Shepard, regardless of their gender, can attempt to romance Samara and Morinth, who are both asari.
Mass Effect	2010	Mass Effect 2	Jack	Pansexual	The developers intended for Jack to be pansexual, but removed the ability for a female Shepard to romance her due to the first game's alleged obscenity controversy. References to her sexuality remain in the game.
Mass Effect	2012	Mass Effect 3	Kaidan Alenko, Kelly Chambers, and Diana Allers, Liara T'Soni and Samara	Bisexual	Five characters express romantic interest in the player character Shepard, regardless of their gender.
Mass Effect	2012	Mass Effect 3	Samantha Traynor	Lesbian	Specialist Samantha Traynor and Lieutenant Steve Cortez are only interested in Shepard if they are of the same gender.
Mass Effect	2012	Mass Effect 3	Steve Cortez	Gay	Specialist Samantha Traynor and Lieutenant Steve Cortez are only interested in Shepard if they are of the same gender.
Mass Effect	2017	Mass Effect: Andromeda	Pelessaria "Peebee" B'Sayle, Keri, Vetra Nyx, and Reyes Vidal	Bisexual	Pathfinder Ryder can romance these characters, regardless of their gender.
Mass Effect	2017	Mass Effect: Andromeda	Jaal Ama Darav	Bisexual	Jaal was added as a romance option for the male protagonist in an update to the game after community feedback.
Mass Effect	2017	Mass Effect: Andromeda	Suvi Anwar	Lesbian	A female Pathfinder Ryder can also have a lesbian relationship with the ship's science officer Dr. Suvi Anwar, and a male Pathfinder Ryder can have a gay relationship with the ship's engineer Gil Brodie.
Mass Effect	2017	Mass Effect: Andromeda	Gil Brodie	Gay	A female Pathfinder Ryder can also have a lesbian relationship with the ship's science officer Dr. Suvi Anwar, and a male Pathfinder Ryder can have a gay relationship with the ship's engineer Gil Brodie.
Mass Effect	2017	Mass Effect: Andromeda	Hainly Abrams	Trans woman	When the game initially released, Abrams would readily inform the player that she is transgender and the masculine name she was given at birth. She tells the player that she left the Milky Way galaxy searching for greater acceptance of her gender identity. The abruptness with which she shares this information received criticism from fans, and the game was later patched so that Abrams would only reveal this information if the player developed a supportive relationship with her.
Metal Gear	2001	Metal Gear Solid 2: Sons of Liberty	Vamp	Bisexual man	Vamp is bisexual, and his name refers to his sexual orientation. He was the lover of Scott Dolph, a Navy commander.
Metal Gear	2001	Metal Gear Solid 2: Sons of Liberty	Scott Dolph	Bisexual man	Vamp is bisexual, and his name refers to his sexual orientation. He was the lover of Scott Dolph, a Navy commander.
Metal Gear	2004	Metal Gear Solid 3: Snake Eater	Major Raikov	Gay	Major Raikov had no interest in women. However, Major Raikov and Volgin are in a relationship.
Metal Gear	2004	Metal Gear Solid 3: Snake Eater	Volgin	Bisexual man	Major Raikov had no interest in women. However, Major Raikov and Volgin are in a relationship.
Metal Gear	2010	Metal Gear Solid: Peace Walker	Dr. Strangelove	Bisexual	Dr. Strangelove is in love with The Boss. As her nickname implies, she had "a strange love". This is a reference to her sexuality.
Mortal Kombat	2015	Mortal Kombat X	Kung Jin	Gay	In a conversation with Raiden, Kung Jin is afraid of the Shaolin not accepting him, with Raiden encouraging him that they "care only about what is in [his] heart. Not whom [his] heart desires." After speculation by fans of Kung Jin's sexuality, the game's cinematic director confirmed that the new kombatant is indeed gay.
Mortal Kombat	2019	Mortal Kombat 11	Mileena, Tanya	Bisexual	Once Mileena's Tower Kombat is complete, her ending shows her and Tanya in a relationship, feeding their newborn baby human flesh. This ends years of speculation on their sexuality.
Mortal Kombat	2023	Mortal Kombat 1	Mileena, Tanya	Bisexual	Following a reset of the series timeline, Mileena and Tanya are once again romantically involved, though their relationship remains secret for political reasons, with the two hoping this can change once Mileena becomes Empress of Outworld.
Nurse Love	2011	Nurse Love Syndrome	Various girls	Lesbian	These are yuri games centered around lesbian nursing school students.
Nurse Love	2015	Nurse Love Addiction	Various girls	Lesbian	These are yuri games centered around lesbian nursing school students.

=== P–Z ===
Series	Year	Game	Character(s)	Classification	Notes
Persona	1999	Persona 2: Innocent Sin	Tatsuya Suou	Bisexual man	Tatsuya is the game's protagonist who attends the prestigious Seven Sisters school. Jun is a Kasugayama student and Tatsuya's childhood best friend, who plays a major role in Innocent Sin as a late party member. Jun is heavily implied to have romantic feelings towards Tatsuya throughout the game, and his sexuality is confirmed by a demon contact in-game. Players can choose to have Tatsuya and Jun enter a relationship, which is treated as them being lovers. Tatsuya's attraction to both sexes is also implied, regardless of which character is romanced.
Persona	1999	Persona 2: Innocent Sin	Jun Kurosu	Gay	
Persona	1999	Persona 2: Innocent Sin	Anna Yoshizaka	Lesbian	Anna is a former star athlete and dropout student from Seven Sisters High. She is implied to hold romantic feelings towards the party member Yukino Mayuzumi. In the official novel where Anna retells the events of Innocent Sin as the protagonist, she confesses her one-sided feelings with the quote "I love you, and am captive to your beautiful face." referencing the poem Der Erlkönig by Johann Wolfgang von Goethe.
Persona	1999	Persona 2: Innocent Sin	Sumaru Genie	Intersex	
Persona	2000	Persona 2: Eternal Punishment	Jun Kashihara	Gay	Jun and Tatsuya from Persona 2: Innocent Sin (1999) reappeared in this game, with the former having a minor role.
Persona	2000	Persona 2: Eternal Punishment	Tatsuya Suou	Bisexual man	Jun and Tatsuya from Persona 2: Innocent Sin (1999) reappeared in this game, with the former having a minor role.
Persona	2000	Persona 2: Eternal Punishment	Anna and Noriko	Lesbian	Anna reappears in this game.
Persona	2000	Persona 2: Eternal Punishment	Sumaru Genie	Intersex	Sumaru Genie reappears in this game.
Persona	2006	Persona 3	"Beautiful Lady"	Transgender woman	In Persona 3, several main characters flirt with a woman, and then misgender her when they realize she is transgender. In the 2024 remake Persona 3 Reload, there is no reference to her being transgender, and they find her strange because she is a conspiracy theorist.
Persona	2009	Persona 3 Portable	Aigis	Bisexual	Aigis shows romantic interest in both the male and female protagonists of the game from her level 8 Social Link onward. Her dialogue in the Social Links remains largely unchanged regardless of the gender the player chooses, though Aigis' dialogue when reaching level 8 and 9 include her worrying over whether her feelings for the female protagonist are appropriate due to not being male.
Persona	2009	Persona 3 Portable	Female Protagonist	Bisexual	The player has the option to romance various male characters if they're playing as the female protagonist by increasing their Social Link's level high enough. They can also romance Aigis this way, though as is also the case in the male protagonist's route, they aren't given an option to decline.
Persona	2009	Persona 3 Portable	Ryoji Mochizuki	Bisexual	During his level 4 Social Link, Ryoji states he would still like the protagonist, "no matter if [they] were a guy or a girl", though only the female protagonist can level up his Social Link and romance him due to the Fortune Arcana instead being tied to Keisuke Hiraga in the male protagonist's route. In Persona 3 Reload, Ryoji was given Linked Episodes where, on the fourth, he admits he wants to be "something more" than a friend to the protagonist (now exclusively male), though he's interrupted before he could elaborate.
Persona	2016	Persona 5	"Scruffy Romantic" Angel	Gay	Persona 5 includes comedic scenes where two gay men sexually harass a teenager. Some versions of Persona 5 Royal altered the scenes to have the men be drag queens mistaking him for a newcomer to the scene.
Persona	2016	Persona 5	"Beefy Trendsetter" Julian	Gay	Persona 5 includes comedic scenes where two gay men sexually harass a teenager. Some versions of Persona 5 Royal altered the scenes to have the men be drag queens mistaking him for a newcomer to the scene.
Persona	2016	Persona 5	Joker	Bisexual	Joker is the protagonist of Persona 5. In Persona 5, he only has the option to date female characters. In Persona 5 Tactica, Joker is asked who he would eventually want to marry, with the player allowed to pick a male character.
Persona	2023	Persona 5 Tactica	Joker	Bisexual	Joker is the protagonist of Persona 5. In Persona 5, he only has the option to date female characters. In Persona 5 Tactica, Joker is asked who he would eventually want to marry, with the player allowed to pick a male character.
Rune Factory	2022	Rune Factory 5	Male/Female Protagonist and all romanceable characters	Bisexual	In the original release of the game, players could only date/marry characters of the opposite gender. When the game released in English, German, and French in 2022, the localizers modified the game to make every romanceable character available for either gender protagonist. The Japanese version was later patched to allow this too.
Rune Factory	2025	Rune Factory: Guardians of Azuma	Male/Female Protagonist and all romanceable characters	Bisexual	As per the previous game, the player can date/marry characters regardless of gender.
Saints Row	2013	Saints Row IV	Playa	Bisexual	Romance options are available for all available crewmates on the ship.
Saints Row	2013	Saints Row IV	Kinzie, Matt Miller, Pierce, Shaundi, CID, Asha, Johnny Gat	Bisexual	Romance options are available for all available crewmates on the ship.
Saints Row	2022	Saints Row (2022 video game)	The Boss	Pansexual/Bisexual, Non-Binary/Transgender (optional)	The Boss is referred to with they/them pronouns.There are no gender restrictions during character creation or for the player's appearance/clothing.
Saints Row	2022	Saints Row (2022 video game)	Kevin	Pansexual/Bisexual, Non-Binary/Transgender (optional)	Kevin is pansexual or bisexual. He mentions an ex-boyfriend, as well as multiple ex-girlfriends.
Story of Seasons	2020	Story of Seasons: Friends of Mineral Town	Playable character and all romanceable characters	Bisexual (except in the Japanese version)	In the Japanese version, the "Best Friends" system allows the player character to "form a lifelong partnership with a character of the same sex." In the North American and European versions, the player character can marry characters of the same gender, and unique dialogue lines are added to acknowledge it as a same-gender relationship.
Story of Seasons	2023	Story of Seasons: A Wonderful Life	Player character	Non-binary (optional), bisexual	The player character can use he/him, she/her, or they/them pronouns, and there are no gender restrictions on the player character's appearance or clothing.
Story of Seasons	2023	Story of Seasons: A Wonderful Life	All romanceable characters	Bisexual	The player character can romance any romanceable character with no gender-based restrictions.
Tekken	1994	Tekken 6, Tekken Tag Tournament 2, Tekken 7	Leo Kliesen	Genderqueer	Leo's gender is deliberately ambiguous.
Trails	2022	Trails Through Daybreak II	Quatre Salision	Intersex, Bisexual	Quatre identifies as male despite being born intersex as a result of experiments. He is still exploring his gender and says he is attracted to both men and women, as shown in one of his connect events. In the same event, he is also caught crossdressing by Van and uses the name "Cattleya" whilst in girl clothes.
Watch Dogs	2016	Watch Dogs 2	Miranda Comay	Trans woman	Miranda Comay is a city councilwoman of San Francisco, a long-time friend of protagonist Marcus Holloway and his family, and a transgender woman.
Watch Dogs	2022	Watch Dogs: Legion	Various procedurally-generated playable characters and NPCs	Various LGBTQ+ identities	The procedural generation that generates Legion's characters includes many options for their sexualities and genders, giving them same-gender significant others or assigning them sexualities outright in their "metadata" section.
Xenoblade	2017	Xenoblade Chronicles 2	Roc	Nonbinary	Despite being referred to with male pronouns, his character status screen does not categorize him as male or female, using a different category entirely. He is also not eligible for in-game missions that require a male character.
Xenoblade	2022	Xenoblade Chronicles 3	Juniper	Non-binary	The English localization of the game uses "they/them" pronouns when referring to Juniper. In other languages, the game refers to Juniper with non-gendered pronouns, a mix of pronouns, or no pronouns. Within the game's data, Juniper's internal gender value is set as "2", while every other character is set as a "0" (male), or a "1" (female). They are voiced in English by nonbinary actor Lilly Hart.
Xenoblade	2022	Xenoblade Chronicles 3	A	Genderqueer	Featured in the Future Redeemed DLC expansion. The English localization does not refer to A by any pronouns, while the Japanese release uses masculine pronouns despite the character's feminine appearance. When Shulk inquires about A's more feminine appearance compared to that of Alvis, the character's previous more masculine form, Rex comments "Logos was the male persona. And Pneuma, the female one. Ontos [as the third being that makes up the Trinity Processor] was meant to stand somewhere in between."

== See also ==
- List of animated works with LGBT characters
- List of graphic art works with LGBT characters
- List of lesbian, gay, bisexual or transgender-related films
- Lists of television programs with LGBT characters
- Lists of American television episodes with LGBT themes
