= Replay value =

Potential of a video game or other media product for replay after its first completion

Replay value (or, colloquially, replayability) is the potential of a video game or other media products for continued play value after its first completion. Factors that can influence perceived replay value include the game's extra characters, secrets and alternate endings. The replay value of a game may also be based entirely on the individual's tastes. A player may enjoy repeating a game because of the music, graphics, gameplay or because of product loyalty. Dynamic environments, challenging AI, a wide variety of ways to accomplish tasks, and a rich array of assets can result in a high replay value.

== Influencing factors ==
=== Plot ===
A game with a linear plot will typically have a lower replay value due to the limited choices a character can make. Games that offer more choices in regard to what the player can do, such as strategy games, roguelikes or construction and management sims, tend to have higher replay value since the player may be able to make each playthrough different.

In role-playing video games (RPGs), plots can be linear or non-linear. An example of an RPG with a non-linear plot is Mass Effect and its sequel Mass Effect 2, whose stories depend on the player's choices. In some games, the player's actions can prevent certain events from taking place or cause new ones to occur. For instance, Juhani in Star Wars: Knights of the Old Republic can either be killed by the player or join their party if they choose not to kill her.

=== Multiple classes ===
This is the ability to play as different characters each time through the game. For example, the game Diablo allows the player to choose one of three character classes: warrior, rogue, or sorcerer. Party-based RPGs can have a good degree of replayability, even if the plot is linear. The plot of Final Fantasy remains the same with each playthrough, but the gameplay varies since the player can choose their party of four from six different classes.

Multitude of classes, accompanied by a multitude of races, is another typical characteristic of roguelike games. For example, Dungeon Crawl employs 22 races and 23 classes, allowing a total of 654 race/class combinations.

=== Multiple characters ===
In some RPGs, such as Skies of Arcadia, the player controls the leader of a party of characters, and additional members will join the group if the player makes the right decisions. It is unlikely that a player will "collect" every possible member on their first attempt, so they may choose to play through the story again to acquire the full cast.

Different characters offer new ways to tackle the obstacles within the game. They may also offer unique dialogue options and opportunities to interact with other players. For example, the SquareSoft RPG Chrono Cross features 45 total playable characters. The game has branching storylines, meaning that multiple playthroughs are required to obtain all the characters.

In the case of action-oriented games, there may be some areas in the game that are only reachable using a character with certain abilities. For example, in Sonic 3 & Knuckles, the character Knuckles can explore areas that Sonic and Tails cannot.

=== Alternate paths ===
Example of replay value: varying story paths in Shadow the Hedgehog.

Some games give the player a choice of which path they want to take through the game. Two examples are Castlevania III: Dracula's Curse and Shadow the Hedgehog. In Castlevania III, Trevor Belmont can choose which path he takes to Dracula's castle. Additionally, the route he takes allows him to encounter three different companions. In Shadow the Hedgehog, Shadow must choose to do Neutral, Dark, or Hero actions in a stage, which affects what stages he travels to. The final, canonical ending is unlocked after completing all other endings.

The first two Resident Evil games feature two main scenarios, each with its own protagonist, supporting characters and scripted sequence of events. Choosing one character over the other usually means following their own storyline, set along different routes but in the same location and occasionally crossing paths with the other character. Beating each scenario is required to get 100% completion, as well as all aspects of the story.

In the point-and-click game genre, Indiana Jones and the Fate of Atlantis offers three paths. The paths are called; Wits, Fists and Team paths. In the first two paths, Indiana Jones leaves alone depending to complete mission basses on either thinking (wits) or fighting (fists) whereas in the third Sophia Hapgood (team) tags along. Another example appears in the game Blade Runner, where Ray McCoy has to decide where to head and with precise timing events may occur otherwise an alternate path then must be taken. These paths are random and some require time-accurate triggering.

Procedural generation in roguelike games leads to high replayability, as no two games are alike.

=== Performance grading ===
A number of modern multi-level games, especially puzzle games, encourage players to repeat and master previously completed levels with a star rating or a letter-grading system, in which the player will be graded for how well they performed in finishing each level. Such a system intends to encourage players to find ways to play certain levels better than they did before and achieve the highest performance rating for each level. Games such as Bayonetta and Metal Gear Rising Revengeance have a high learning curve that encourages players to try to get the highest scores possible.

=== Unlockable characters and content ===
Sometimes beating the game or completing certain challenges will allow the player to use an NPC from the game or even a new character. For instance, in Baldur's Gate: Dark Alliance, the drow ranger Drizzt Do'Urden is an unlockable character. Other examples of unlockable content can include art, music, behind-the-scenes featurettes, and interviews with a game's producer, artist, or voice talent. Electronic Arts' games based on The Two Towers and The Return of the King feature many different unlockables of this nature. As the player progresses through the game, he can view production stills from the Lord of the Rings films, concept art, and interviews with some of the actors. Completing either game unlocks new characters, missions, and cheat codes.

Some games enhance replayability by unlocking a second story once the main game is beaten. For instance, the 'Reverse/Rebirth' scenario in Kingdom Hearts: Chain of Memories features Riku as a playable character rather than Sora and occurs concurrently with the game's main plot. The 'Separate Ways' campaign of Resident Evil 4 features Ada Wong, whose path intertwines with that of Leon S. Kennedy. Silent Hill 2 features the 'Born From a Wish' scenario, chronicling events prior to the game's main scenario from the perspective of Maria.

=== Alternate endings ===
One of the most common ways to increase the replay value of a game is to offer multiple endings. An early example of alternate endings is Metroid, whose endings are unlocked depending on how fast the player completes the game. Other games with multiple endings or secret endings include Star Wars: Knights of the Old Republic, Marvel: Ultimate Alliance, the Silent Hill series, the Kingdom Hearts series, Chrono Trigger, S.T.A.L.K.E.R.: Shadow of Chernobyl, and Blade Runner.

== Other factors ==
Games where the map and starting position are different every time the players play it tend to have long-lasting appeal. The community-developed mods for many games also contribute to increased replayability and long life for many games. Due to the limits of AI behaviour and the appeal and challenge of playing against friends, multiplayer is also often considered to increase the lifespan of a game.

Some games encourage replaying levels by adding time trial modes. Other times, players may impose restrictions on a game to make it more difficult. Examples include Nuzlocke runs in Pokémon and speedruns in a wide variety of games.

== See also ==
- High score
- Time attack § Video games
