= The Orion Conspiracy =

1995 video game

- Developer: Divide By Zero
- Publisher: Domark
- Designer: Andy Blazdell
- Programmer: Simon Lipowicz
- Artist: J. D. Duncan
- Composer: Ian McCue
- Platform: MS-DOS
- Release: 1995
- Genre: Adventure
- Mode: Single-player

The Orion Conspiracy is a graphic adventure video game that was released in 1995. The game was published by Domark and developed by Divide By Zero for the MS-DOS.

== Synopsis ==
=== Setting ===
In the year 2160, the universe is run by corrupt corporations and governments that will do anything in order to get what they want. On a space station, Devlin McCormack has just buried his estranged son, only to receive news afterwards that he was murdered. Devlin seeks to unravel the conspiracy behind his son's murder.

The game came with a 12-page comic book produced especially to be packaged with the game. It details the backstory of Devlin McCormack and his family. Devlin is the sole survivor of an attack on his ship during the Company Wars, sustaining permanent damage to his lungs due to smoke inhalation. Returning home and unable to work, (making him a social outcast in the company-centric colony) Devlin becomes severely depressed, combined with survivor's guilt. The toll of this drives his son Danny to leave home and become estranged from the family. Devlin's wife commits suicide shortly thereafter. The comic ends years later, with Devlin arriving at the space station for Danny's funeral.

=== Plot ===
An accident kills an engineer named Danny McCormack. While repairing a probe, an explosion sends his scout ship out of control and it falls into a nearby black hole. Soon Devlin McCormack arrives to attend the funeral on Cerberus. After the funeral, Devlin receives an anonymous tip that confirms his son was murdered. Devlin vows to kill whoever was responsible for this.

The base is shared by the staff of competing companies - Kobayashi (whom Danny worked for) and Mogami-Hudson. The leader of Kobayashi refuses to let a civilian stay on the station, so Devlin sabotages the navigation computer of one of the shuttles. This forces him to stay until a supply shuttle visits the station sometime in the coming weeks. Unable to gain access to Danny's possessions due to company policy, Devlin instead blackmails a senior officer to get them. He finds some love letters, which to his surprise show his son had a gay lover named Steve Kaufmann. Kaufmann walks in and angrily confronts Devlin over the destructive relationship Devlin had with his son before storming off.

Devlin retires to his quarters for the night but awakes to find out Kaufmann has been murdered. As he was the last person to see him alive, Devlin is arrested and confined to the observatory (as the station lacks a proper brig). He escapes by cutting off the only air vent in the room, which tricks the computer into opening the door to restore the air supply.

After escaping, Devlin discovers unusual eggs on a cargo shuttle. Doctor Chu walks in and reveals herself to be a shape-shifting alien responsible for placing the eggs, with a plan to replace the Cerberus crew and spread themselves throughout the galaxy. Devlin flees, but eventually kills the creature by igniting a fuel tank in the engine room.

Maintenance Officer Meyer arrives after hearing the explosion and, afraid of being fired for incompetence, asks Devlin to keep the engine damage a secret so he can fix the problem without anyone ever knowing. Roland overhears the conversation from outside the room and attempts to escape on the transport, unwittingly carrying the alien eggs with him. Devlin is forced to break into the station's armoury and destroy the ship with Cerberus' laser cannon to prevent the aliens spreading throughout the galaxy.

Devlin is then confronted by an armed and furious Captain Shannon. It turns out Shannon's wife served on Devlin's ship, which was destroyed in the Company Wars, and Shannon believes Devlin left her to die. Shannon arranged Danny's transfer to Cerberus station and sabotaged the probe to kill him, so that Devlin would feel the pain of losing a loved one just as he had. As Shannon is about to kill Devlin, Meyer jumps him from behind and Shannon is shot dead in the struggle.

While this is happening, Ward is in an armed stand-off with the rest of the Kobayashi crew; he witnessed an alien changing from human form and went on a berserk rampage. Brooks impatiently attempts to snatch a grenade from Ward's hand which detonates, making the corridor unstable. Devlin and LaPaz retrieve Brooks' body and seal the corridor from the outside seconds before it de-pressurizes.

The engines on Cerberus need a replacement part which can only be found on the probe which killed Danny. Devlin flies out on a scout shuttle to retrieve the part but while he was out, Mogami-Hudson attempt to kill the aliens by cutting off all life-support on the station. (apart from inside their own labs) Devlin uses the shuttle to bomb Mogami-Hudson's power lines from the outside, returning control of the station to Kobayashi and devastating the Mogami-Hudson lab. Devlin goes looking for survivors and discovers a fatally wounded scientist; before dying, she admits they found the shape-shifting aliens within the asteroid and revived several of them.

Devlin suggests evacuating the station, but Meyer points out the shuttle's navigation computer is still wiped. LaPaz reveals that the pilot (Brooks) has a backup stored in a chip inside her head, which is why LaPaz saved her corpse from being flushed out into space. While Devlin retrieves the chip, Meyer discovers a booby-trap on the shuttle intended for Devlin. Meyer needs time to disarm the trap, so Devlin and LaPaz hunt down and destroy one of the shape-shifters using a corrosive formula developed by Mogami-Hudson. The remaining two return to the shuttle, only for Meyer to tell them Lowe (who disappeared during the hunt) was a shape-shifter whom he had just fought off.

Since Lowe could use the laser cannons to shoot down their craft as they try to leave, the survivors decide to activate the station's self-destruct as it will shut down all systems 30 seconds prior to detonation - including the laser cannons. Devlin sets the self-destruct and booby-traps the switch with a concussion charge. Lowe, attempting to override the self-destruct, is blown up and Devlin races back to the shuttle, which escapes the station as it explodes.

== Gameplay ==
The game has a fullscreen, minimalistic interface. The game utilizes SVGA graphics combined with (new for the time) computer-generated cutscenes. In difference to traditional point and click adventures of the time, verbs and actions are only shown when an object or character is clicked on, rather than being permanently displayed on screen. Verb or item icons that do not apply to the object are not displayed.

== Reviews ==
- Pelit (Jun, 1995) gave the game a rating of 78%.
- Power Play (Jul, 1995) gave the game a rating of 54%.
- Quandary (Aug, 1995) gave the game a rating of 30%.
- Just Adventure (1996) nominated the game for their Dungeon of Shame.
- Next Generation reviewed the PC version of the game, rating it one star out of five, and stated that "this is quite simply a bad game. Unless you're desperate for a new science fiction adventure, give The Orion Conspiracy a miss."

== See also ==
- List of video games with LGBT characters
