= Nurse Love Syndrome =

2011 video game

- Developer(s): Kogado Studio
- Publisher(s): JP: Kogado Studio; WW: Degica; Limited Run Games (Nintendo Switch)
- Platform(s): PlayStation Portable; PlayStation Vita; Microsoft Windows; Nintendo Switch
- Release: Original (PlayStation Portable): JP: September 29, 2011; RE:Therapy; PlayStation Portable, Microsoft Windows: JP: June 28, 2012; RE:Therapy (Remastered); PlayStation Vita, Microsoft Windows: JP: April 19, 2019; WW: April 18, 2019; Nintendo Switch: JP: April 19, 2019; WW: December 26, 2019
- Genre(s): Visual novel
- Mode(s): Single-player

Nurse Love Syndrome (白衣性恋愛症候群, Hakuisei Ren'ai Shōkōgun; lit. White Robe Love Syndrome) is a yuri visual novel game developed by Kogado Studio's Shimarisu-san Team with the script writer being Sakusa Sakura. The series has an official abbreviated name of "ShiroKoi" using the first two kanji of the first two words of the whole title. The game is a visual novel about a girl named Kaori Sawai who was saved by hospital staff after an accident during her youth and decided to repay them by becoming a nurse at the age of 21. The story starts with Kaori starting her first day as a nurse at the hospital she would start working at and meet other people-some connected to her past.

== Gameplay ==
Being a visual novel, the game offers little gameplay, with the player pressing a button to advance the narrative as they read and occasionally using a menu interface to select choices that affect the game's story and lead to different endings.

== Release ==
The first release of the game was in 2011 exclusively for the PlayStation Portable. In 2012, an expanded version of the original game was released titled Hakuisei Ren'ai Shōkōgun RE:Therapy for Microsoft Windows and PSP featuring an extended storyline for the original main characters, and new character route additions for previously minor characters Yasuko and Ami, as well as a remake-exclusive character, a middle-school girl aged Mayuki. On April 19, 2019, a new version of Hakuisei Ren'ai Shōkōgun RE:Therapy was released on Microsoft Windows, PlayStation Vita and Nintendo Switch in Japan with improved character sprites and event scenes. The Windows and PlayStation Vita versions were released in English and Chinese simultaneously as Nurse Love Syndrome, published by Degica. The Nintendo Switch version was released in English on December 26, 2019.

A new game in the same series, Hakuisei Aijō Izonshō (白衣性愛情依存症; lit. White Robe Love Addiction), was released on PlayStation Vita on April 30, 2015, with a new cast of characters and art design. It was subsequently released for Microsoft Windows on December 25, 2015, and for Nintendo Switch on May 24, 2018. Hakuisei Aijō Izonshō was in 2016 released in English and Chinese for Windows, and the following year on PlayStation Vita under the title Nurse Love Addiction, localizing the "White Robe" part of the series title to "Nurse", likely due to non-Japanese nurse uniform colors no longer being exclusively of white coloring.

Titled Nurse Love Obsession, a physical version containing both Nurse Love Syndrome and Nurse Love Addiction was published by Limited Run Games for the Nintendo Switch.

== Reception ==
In a review for Digitally Downloaded, Matt S. said that Nurse Love Addiction "[represented] some of the sharpest, most subtle writing that [he'd] come across within the visual novel medium," but called its gameplay "primitive" due to the lack of a flowchart mechanic. Across two "playtests" of Nurse Love Syndrome for Silliconera, Alistair Wong considered the details of nurse life and writing quality in the game's common route to be "enthralling" but the romance routes to be a "mixed bag."
