= Great Greed =

1992 video game

- North American box art
- Developer: Namco
- Publisher: Namco
- Platform: Game Boy
- Release: JP: September 17, 1992; US: April 1993
- Genre: Role-playing
- Mode: Single-player

Great Greed (Note: Japanese: ビタミーナ王国物語, Hepburn: Bitamīna Oukoku Monogatari; lit. 'Vitamina Kingdom Story') is a 1992 role-playing video game developed and published by Namco for the Game Boy. The player controls Sierra Sam who is warped from his own world to the Greene Kingdom, where he attempts to stop Biohaz from causing havoc.

As a role-playing game (RPG), the player does various tasks such as wandering a world map, battling monsters and exploring towns. Battles in the game are fought in real-time, with magic spells being set to each direction of the d-pad, and attacking and dodging options being used by the other Game Boy buttons. It was released in Japan in 1992 and in 1993 in the United States, being one of the few RPGs Namco would publish in the United States until the genres popularity grew later in the decade.

Critics in Famitsu and later for Hardcore Gaming 101 found the game somewhat limited by the Game Boy compared to other RPGs. One reviewer in the Japanese magazine complimented the game's quirkier themes and characters while Hardcore Gaming 101 said this was the highlight of the game.

== Plot and setting ==
The game's plot deals with a protagonist whose name that the player sets, but referred to as "Sierra Sam" in the game's promotional materials. Sam, a resident of the "real world," is transported to the fictional world of Greene in order to prevent Bio-Haz from continuing to pollute Greene, a world of seven nations.

Many characters in the game have food related names, such as the King's daughters being named Cupcake, Candy and Truffle, while the Sorceress who pulls Sam into the world of Greene is named Microwave.

== Gameplay ==
Sam faces off against a food-themed monster.

Great Greed is a role-playing video game. The game had regular elements of these games such as exploring a large overworld map and visiting towns and fighting monsters.

The combat in the game is done in a real-time style, opposed to turn-based. The combat has players use the sets scrolls to each direction of the control pad on the game boy, this allows the player to choose one of the four to activate during battle. The other buttons on the game boy are used to attack and dodge.

== Development and release ==
Great Greed was developed by Namco. There are differences between the Japanese and English version of Great Greed. Some of the food themed characters change, such as the princesses in the Japanese version are named after the English alphabet with characters named Ayna, Beana, Ceena, etc. while they are given food-related names in the English version such as Candy, Cup Cake, and Truffle. The environmental themes of the game is more largely emphasized in the English version and is more of a late-game twist in the Japanese version.

Great Greed was released for the Game Boy in Japan on September 17, 1992. Namco presented Great Greed at the Winter Consumer Electronics Show in 1993 along with the games Splatterhouse 3 (1993), Rolling Thunder 3 (1993), Battle Cars (1993), and Metal Marines (1993). It was released in the United States in April 1993. The game was published by Namco and was one of the few RPGs Namco would publish in the United States until the genres boom in popularity with games like Super Mario RPG (1996) and Final Fantasy VII (1997).

== Reception ==
Reception

Review scores
Publication	Score
Famitsu	6/10, 6/10, 7/10, 5/10
Video Games	71%

In the Japanese magazine Famitsu, four reviewers commented on the game. Two commented that you could tell it was an RPG made with the Game Boy in mind due to the controls and the leisurely paced story and battles make it suitable for pick-up and play handheld games. Two reviewers commented on the themes with one enjoying the quirky story and another being amused by the character's names.

In a review from Nintendo Power magazine, the anonymous reviewers said the game's graphics were detailed but may be too small for some players. While the review of the game complimented its scope and depth they said it was not always obvious where to go in the game which could lead to players wandering around the map trying to find where to go next. Frank Heukemes in Video Games found it be a slightly above average game a well crafted plot, extensive amount of worlds to explore and exciting battles. They found the mechanics of the game weak with all too familiar magic attacks.

In a retrospective review, Robin Willow of Hardcore Gaming 101 said the biggest drawback of the game was that spells lacked instructions on what they would do. While Willow find this obvious for spells called "Flame" or "Freeze", others were less obvious. Willow echoed the reviewer in Famitsu stating that the various food-themed enemies silly scenarios were the game's high points. Willow also applauded features they described as "ahead of its time", such as an auto-save feature, which saved the users game progress every few minutes.

Willow complimented the game for having gay representation in video games as at the end of the game, the player can choose to marry a select character, including male non-playable characters (NPCs) or the King himself. While Willow said this addition is intended as a joke, they found it to be "somewhat wholesome" during a period when other games like Harvest Moon (1996) would not have same-sex marriages.

== See also ==
- List of Game Boy games
- List of Namco games
