= Juhani (Star Wars) =

Character from Star Wars

- Star Wars character
- Concept art for the Star Wars video game character Juhani.
- First appearance: Star Wars: Knights of the Old Republic
- Created by: BioWare
- Voiced by: Courtenay Taylor

In-universe information
- Species: Cathar
- Origin: Taris

Juhani is a fictional character in BioWare's 2003 role-playing video game Star Wars: Knights of the Old Republic. She is a Jedi Knight of the feline Cathar species who initially appears as an enemy, but can be redeemed and recruited by the player character, Revan. If Revan is female, Juhani can develop romantic feelings for her and the player may pursue a same-sex romance. She is voiced by Courtenay Taylor.

Juhani is notable as the first LGBTQ video game character in the Star Wars media franchise, specifically as a lesbian character. Retrospective commentary has focused on her romance arc as an early example of queer representation in mainstream role-playing games, while also noting the subtle and limited way in which the romance is presented.

== Development ==
=== Concept and creation ===
Peter Thomas was assigned to write Juhani. The character was originally named Bastila during early development of Knights of the Old Republic, until that name was reassigned to the game's human female Jedi lead character. Juhani's voice actress Courtenay Taylor observed that the character she played "had this pull of light and dark, good and evil", and said she is drawn to playing characters who have that kind of inner conflict.

In the game, Juhani is an optional party member. If she is recruited, female player characters have the option of exploring a romance with the character, who would develop romantic feelings that the player can choose to reciprocate or discourage. According to Knights of the Old Republic writer Drew Karpyshyn, the team had been trying to create an interesting character, but because there were not yet gay or bisexual characters in any Star Wars media up until that time, the writers had to approach the subject carefully. Knights of the Old Republic co-designer David Gaider said in a retrospective interview with Polygon that he was surprised that other members of the development team, most of whom were heterosexual men, were interested in including a same-sex romance option for the game. Gaider, who is an openly gay man, had not proposed such content for the video game himself because he assumed that both his colleagues and players would reject it.

Gaider explained during a presentation at GDC 2013 that the writers never sought approval to include Juhani's romance storyline and were never told to remove or alter it. However, the team did anticipate a backlash from the player base, which led them to self-censor the character's romance dialogue prior to the game's release. The decision was made to present Juhani's dialogue with enough subtlety that some players would not have realized that the character had been written as lesbian. Juhani would avoid any direct declarations of love, with indirect references to a past female lover rather than identifying her as such, effectively obscuring the romantic relationship. In a question-and-answer post on LucasArts' former LucasForums dated February 18, 2008, Gaider referred to the possibility of the player encountering Juhani's former lover on Dantooine, and that they would be attacked if Juhani had been killed.

=== Character ===
Juhani is a member of the Cathar, a species known within series lore for their courage in battle, their fierce loyalty and their quick tempers. She is capable of camouflaging and concealing herself with the power of the Force as a unique innate talent. Her personality is presented through her background story as a perfectionist who does not easily accept failure in herself or in others, who devotes herself fully to the Jedi Code, and is determined to master both her volatile emotions and her ability in the Force. She is characterised as being locked in a constant struggle to find a balance between her instincts and her training, which makes it difficult for her to follow Jedi teachings without strict discipline.

== Appearances ==
=== In Knights of the Old Republic ===
Before the player encounters her on Dantooine in Star Wars: Knights of the Old Republic, Juhani accidentally struck her master Quatra during a lightsaber training duel after she lost control of her anger. Overcome by fear and guilt, Juhani falls to the dark side and secludes herself in a grove where the player confronts her. Juhani's fate is dependent on the player's choice as Revan during their initial encounter where Juhani initiates the attack. If Juhani is spared, she will attempt to atone for her momentary lapse of judgment and joins the player's party.

If Juhani is slain, a female Jedi non-player character named Belaya will be angered by the turn of events and confronts the player before leaving the Jedi Order; it is implied that she is or was previously in a relationship with Juhani. Belaya will reappear as a fallen Dark Jedi and attacks Revan's party if they travel to Korriban.

Beyond her character-specific side-quest involving revenge on a slave trader who murdered her parents, Juhani does not play a significant role in the game's narrative following her recruitment. If the player chooses to re-embrace Revan's original position as the Dark Lord of the Sith later in the game's storyline, she will turn on the player along with fellow party member Jolee Bindo.

A female player character has the option to pursue a romantic relationship with Juhani. In the initial release of the game, a bug allowed the character to voice one line of romantic dialogue to both male and female player characters, leading to players as well as the official Databank entry for the character initially identifying her as bisexual. BioWare later released a patch which corrected Juhani's romance arc and restricted it for female player characters only. A portion of the character's story content, including her romance arc, was cut from the game before release, although the unused dialogue files still exist within the game.

=== Later appearances ===
While she is shown as a hologram within one scene in Star Wars: The Old Republic and has been mentioned in a few instances, Juhani makes no further appearances in the series. Juhani is mentioned in several Star Wars reference books, such as Jedi vs. Sith: The Essential Guide to the Force and the second volume of The Complete Star Wars Encyclopedia. Wizards of the Coast created a miniature for the character, along with other characters in the Knights of the Old Republic series, which was released on August 19, 2008 along with the Knights of the Old Republic Campaign Guide a hardcover supplement to Wizards of the Coast's Star Wars Roleplaying Game.

Juhani is available as a playable character for the mobile game Star Wars: Galaxy of Heroes.

== Reception ==
=== Critical reception ===
Reception of Juhani has been mixed, with commentators focusing both on her significance as an LGBTQ character and on the limited role of her romance and personal arc within the game. David Silver, guest writing for VentureBeat, remarked that characters like Juhani are an example of the positive influence of LGBT video game characters, as they promote understanding and represent the real life LGBT community in a strong and positive light. Kurka was of the view that Juhani's redemption was affirming and resonated with players who struggle with identity issues and the belief that "they were not “right” according to the standards of their society". The Advocate ranked Knights of the Old Republic sixth on their list of notable video games with queer content, citing Juhani's character arc as the reason for the placement.

Conversely, Robert Purchese from Eurogamer commented that Juhani's story arc was relatively unexplored and her romance subplot was not up to BioWare's usual standards. He remarked that while she did open up to Revan about her feelings, "the final battle commences and there's never time to find out what happens next". UGO Networks considered Juhani to be one of the worst Star Wars Expanded Universe characters, arguing that Juhani's only saving grace is her potential romantic subplot, whereas she is a bland and pointless character who is supposedly underpowered compared to other Jedi party members and is "almost a non-entity in the story".

Writing for VultureHound magazine, Thomas Ricard praised Taylor's work as Juhani; he described her delivery of Juhani's lines "with a purring Russian accent" and credited her ability to convey her character's inner battles exactly when she needs to, and that Juhani "would only be a conceptually interesting character at best" without Taylor's ability to "track down her character’s conflicted emotions with remarkable precision".

=== Themes and analysis ===
Critical commentary on Juhani has focused primarily on her role in queer representation rather than on her prominence in the main plot of Knights of the Old Republic. Writing for IGN in an article detailing the history of LGBT representation in video games, Keza McDonald considered Juhani to be unusual in that she was designed to be exclusively lesbian when contrasted to BioWare's other contemporary supporting characters who may be romantically available to the player character regardless of gender. Brianna Dym, writing for Press Start, discusses Juhani as part of BioWare's broader history of queer romance design. Dym argues that while BioWare included gay, lesbian, and bisexual romance subplots in its games, those subplots often remained constrained by the heterocentric assumptions of mainstream game design. In Juhani's case, her romantic content is optional, comparatively limited, and less explicit than the heterosexual romance arcs available to the player. Dym contrasts this presentation with the romances involving Carth Onasi and Bastila Shan, arguing that Juhani's feelings are framed with greater ambiguity and apology.

Adrienne Shaw and Elizaveta Friesem include Knights of the Old Republic in their broader study of LGBTQ content in digital games, which classifies queer representation through categories such as characters, relationships, romance, player actions, and textual mentions. Shaw and Friesem explored Juhani's significance, not only in terms of her existence as a lesbian character, but in how her queerness is made visible through optional dialogue, player choice, and relationship mechanics.

Eamon Reid observed that Juhani's in-game dialogue highlights the inequality and discrimination faced by characters from financially disadvantaged or ethnically diverse backgrounds in the Star Wars Universe; this is informed by her background as an individual of lower socioeconomic status in her home planet of Taris, as many of her fellow citizens face crushing poverty, taxes from the corrupt government, extortion from local criminals, and if they are non-human, bigotry and hate from the more affluent and human citizens.

=== Legacy ===
Juhani has been discussed as a milestone in LGBTQ representation in both video games and Star Wars media, and is often brought up in discussions about the history of LGBT representation and portrayal of queer characters in the Star Wars universe. The Daily Dot placed Juhani within a broader history of LGBT video game characters, noting that Knights of the Old Republic was a major mainstream release and that Juhani was the first lesbian character in the Star Wars universe. Rostislav Kurka from Sci Fi Fantasy Network considered Juhani to be an important LGBTQ protagonist, stressing that her appearance was remarkable in terms of the entire gaming industry, as there had not been many LGBTQ characters in mainstream video games at that time. Writing for GamesRadar+, Sam Greer observed that while Juhani's sexuality was not always apparent to players, the character was identified as BioWare's first clear step toward more inclusive romance design, which led to BioWare's later pattern of including queer romance options with their subsequent video game releases.

Gaider considered Juhani's appearance in Knights of the Old Republic to be a watershed moment, as it motivated him to advocate for greater inclusivity in BioWare's later video game projects during his time as an employee. Juhani's portrayal influenced Gaider's approach to LGBTQ+ inclusion in his own writing, including his later work on the Dragon Age series.

== See also ==
- Media portrayal of lesbianism
