= List of Mass Effect 2 downloadable content =

The Cerberus Network is an online downloadable content and news service for Mass Effect 2. It can be accessed from the game's main menu.

Mass Effect 2 is an action role-playing video game developed by BioWare and released for Microsoft Windows and Xbox 360 in 2010, and for PlayStation 3 in 2011. The game features a variety of downloadable content (DLC) packs that were released from January 2010 to May 2011. The downloadable content ranges from single in-game character outfits to entirely new plot-related missions. Notable packs include Kasumi – Stolen Memory, Overlord, Lair of the Shadow Broker, and Arrival. The game's downloadable content was generally well received by critics and some packs were nominated for Best DLC at the Spike Video Game Awards.

New purchases of the game are provided with a one-time use card granting access code that unlocks the game's Cerberus Network, an online downloadable content and news service that enables free bonus content for the game. However, users who buy the game used have to pay for the Cerberus Network separately if they want access to the bonus content. Some downloadable content packs were originally only available for the Microsoft Windows and Xbox 360 versions of Mass Effect 2 through limited promotional opportunities. These were then made available on the PlayStation Network when the game was released for the PlayStation 3. In 2021, all of the Mass Effect 2 downloadable content was remastered as part of the Mass Effect Legendary Edition.

== Narrative packs ==
Title	Release date	Ref.
Normandy Crash Site	January 26, 2010	
Requires the Cerberus Network.; Adds a mission and other items.; Concerns the exploration of the SSV Normandy crash site.
Zaeed – The Price of Revenge	January 28, 2010	
Requires the Cerberus Network.; Adds two missions, a squad member, a heavy weapon, and other items.; Concerns Zaeed Massani and his history with a mercenary organization called the Blue Suns.
Firewalker	March 23, 2010	
Requires the Cerberus Network.; Adds five missions and other items.; Concerns planetary exploration aboard a hovering vehicle.
Kasumi – Stolen Memory	April 6, 2010	
Included in the PlayStation 3 version of Mass Effect 2.; Adds two missions, a squad member, a submachine gun, and other items.; Concerns the recovery of data of great importance to Kasumi Goto.
Overlord	June 15, 2010	
Included in the PlayStation 3 version of Mass Effect 2.; Adds five missions and other items.; Concerns the events of an experimental virtual intelligence that has gone rogue.
Lair of the Shadow Broker	September 7, 2010	
Included in the PlayStation 3 version of Mass Effect 2.; Adds a mission and other items.; Concerns Liara T'Soni and her history with an information dealer known as the Shadow Broker.
Genesis	January 18, 2011	
Requires the Cerberus Network for the PlayStation 3 version of Mass Effect 2.; Adds a digital interactive comic that allows the player to impact the story of the game.; Concerns major events of the original Mass Effect.
Arrival	March 29, 2011	
Adds a mission and other items.; Concerns the events of an imminent invasion of a highly advanced machine race of synthetic-organic starships.

== Weapon and armor packs ==
Title	Release date	Ref.
Collectors' Weapon and Armor	January 26, 2010	
Originally included in the Mass Effect 2 Digital Deluxe Edition and Limited Collector's Edition that were released for Microsoft Windows and Xbox 360.; Adds an assault rifle and an armor set.
Terminus Weapon and Armor	January 26, 2010	
Originally available for the Microsoft Windows and Xbox 360 versions of Mass Effect 2 through limited promotional opportunities.; Adds a heavy weapon and an armor set.
Blood Dragon Armor	January 26, 2010	
Originally available for the Microsoft Windows and Xbox 360 versions of Mass Effect 2 through limited promotional opportunities, and included in the PlayStation 3 version of Mass Effect 2.; Adds an armor set.
Recon Hood	January 26, 2010	
Originally available for the Microsoft Windows and Xbox 360 versions of Mass Effect 2 through limited promotional opportunities.; Adds an armor part.
Sentry Interface	January 26, 2010	
Originally available for the Microsoft Windows and Xbox 360 versions of Mass Effect 2 through limited promotional opportunities.; Adds an armor part.
Umbra Visor	January 26, 2010	
Originally available for the Microsoft Windows and Xbox 360 versions of Mass Effect 2 through limited promotional opportunities.; Adds an armor part.
Cerberus Weapon and Armor	February 9, 2010	
Requires the Cerberus Network.; Adds a shotgun and an armor set.
Arc Projector	March 9, 2010	
Requires the Cerberus Network.; Adds a heavy weapon.
Equalizer Pack	May 4, 2010	
Adds two armor parts and an armor set. (Note: The armor set, called Inferno Armor, was individually and originally available for the Microsoft Windows and Xbox 360 versions of Mass Effect 2 through limited promotional opportunities.)
Aegis Pack	July 6, 2010	
Adds five armor parts and a sniper rifle. (Note: The sniper rifle, called M-29 Incisor, was individually and originally included in the Mass Effect 2 Digital Deluxe Edition that was released for Microsoft Windows and Xbox 360.)
Firepower Pack	August 3, 2010	
Adds an assault rifle, a heavy pistol, and a shotgun.

== Appearance packs ==
Title	Release date	Ref.
Alternate Appearance Pack 1	March 23, 2010	
Adds an alternate appearance for Jack, Thane Krios, and Garrus Vakarian.
Alternate Appearance Pack 2	February 8, 2011	
Adds an alternate appearance for Tali'Zorah, Miranda Lawson, and Grunt.
