= Cris Velasco =

American video game composer

- Genres: Classical, video game
- Occupation: Composer
- Labels: Materia Collective; Azeroth Music; Sumthing Else Music Works

Cris Velasco is an American video game and film composer. His works include the musical scores for Overwatch, Mass Effect, Borderlands, God of War, StarCraft II: Heart of the Swarm and Bloodborne.

== Biography ==
He has been featured in the God of War video game series, with four tracks on the God of War, four on the God of War II, and five on the God of War III soundtracks. He also composed music for the video game based on the original Battlestar Galactica series, Terminator 3: Redemption, TMNT, Anderson's Cross, Company of Heroes 2, Haze, Splinter Cell: Double Agent (main theme only), Clive Barker's Jericho and is credited with doing additional music for Van Helsing. He is also credited to doing the game score for Hellgate: London in 2007.

Velasco collaborates with fellow composer Sascha Dikiciyan and in 2009, they both scored the soundtrack for the game Prototype, along with other projects together. He has also scored tracks for Mass Effect 2, Borderlands, Tron: Evolution and Mass Effect 3. He has also scored tracks for Zombi U, Enemy Front, Bloodborne, Battleborn, and Lords of the Fallen.

== Works ==
=== Video games ===
| Game | Year |
|---|---|
| Beast of Reincarnation | 2026 |
| Lords of the Fallen | 2023 |
| Fae Farm | 2023 |
| Carrion | 2020 |
| Gylt | 2019 |
| Groundhog Day: Like Father Like Son | 2019 |
| Darksiders 3 | 2018 |
| Dauntless | 2017 |
| Resident Evil 7: Biohazard | 2017 |
| Overwatch | 2016 |
| Battleborn | 2016 |
| Bloodborne | 2015 |
| Tales from the Borderlands | 2015 |
| Assassin's Creed Unity - Dead Kings | 2015 |
| Company of Heroes 2 | 2013 |
| Starcraft II: Heart of the Swarm | 2013 |
| Injustice: Gods Among Us | 2013 |
| Mass Effect 3:Citadel | 2013 |
| Borderlands 2: Sir Hammerlock’s Big Game Hunt | 2013 |
| Mass Effect 3: Omega | 2012 |
| Mass Effect 3: Leviathan | 2012 |
| Borderlands 2 | 2012 |
| Zombi | 2012 |
| Mass Effect 3 | 2012 |
| Kingdom Under Fire 2 | 2016 |
| TERA | 2012 |
| Soul Calibur V | 2012 |
| The Long Dark | 2019 |
| Heroes of Might and Magic VI | 2012 |
| Warhammer 40,000: Space Marine | 2012 |
| Section 8: Prejudice | 2012 |
| Mortal Kombat 9 | 2011 |
| Mass Effect 2: Arrival | 2011 |
| The Agency | 2011 |
| Tron: Evolution | 2011 |
| Monday Night Combat | 2011 |
| Starcraft 2 | 2010 |
| Mass Effect 2: Kasumi – Stolen Memory | 2010 |
| God of War III | 2010 |
| Darksiders | 2010 |
| Borderlands | 2010 |
| G.I. Joe | 2010 |
| Prototype | 2009 |
| Mortal Kombat vs. DC Universe | 2008 |
| Haze | 2008 |
| Battlezone | 2008 |
| Beowulf: The Game | 2007 |
| Stuntman: Ignition | 2007 |
| Stranglehold | 2007 |
| Mythos | 2011 |
| Hellgate: London | 2007 |
| Teenage Mutant Ninja Turtles | 2007 |
| God of War II | 2007 |
| Clive Barker’s Jericho | 2007 |
| Dark Messiah of Might and Magic | 2007 |
| Marvel Ultimate Alliance | 2006 |
| Splinter Cell: Double Agent | 2006 |
| SpyHunter: Nowhere to Run | 2006 |
| Jaws Unleashed | 2006 |
| God of War | 2005 |
| Terminator 3: Redemption | 2005 |
| Battle Castles | 2005 |
| Van Helsing | 2004 |
| Battlestar Galactica | 2004 |
| Maximo vs. Army of Zin | 2004 |
| Gunman Chronicles | 2004 |
