= Mass Effect 3: From Ashes =

- Developer: BioWare
- Publisher: Electronic Arts
- Series: Mass Effect
- Engine: Unreal Engine 3
- Platforms: Microsoft Windows; Xbox 360; PlayStation 3; Wii U
- Release: March 6, 2012: Windows, PlayStation 3, Xbox 360; NA: March 6, 2012; AU: March 8, 2012; EU: March 9, 2012 Wii U; NA: November 18, 2012; PAL: November 30, 2012
- Genres: Action role-playing, third-person shooter
- Mode: Single-player

Mass Effect 3: From Ashes is a downloadable content (DLC) pack developed by BioWare and published by Electronic Arts for the 2012 action role-playing video game Mass Effect 3. It was released for Microsoft Windows, PlayStation 3, and Xbox 360 as a standalone download on March 6, 2012, and included with all retail copies of Mass Effect 3: Special Edition for Wii U. Set within the Milky Way galaxy during the 22nd century, From Ashes follows Commander Shepard and the crew of the Normandy as they investigate an attack on the colony of Eden Prime by the anthropocentric terrorist group Cerberus, where a Prothean artifact had recently been unearthed.

From Ashes is the first major downloadable content pack for Mass Effect 3. It provides additional background lore and war asset mechanics, a new party member (or "squadmate"), a new weapon type, and new cosmetic outfits for playable characters. While From Ashes received a generally mixed critical reception from video game publications, the decision to release the pack as paid DLC alongside the launch of Mass Effect 3 has been the subject of controversy.

== Gameplay ==
A gameplay screenshot showing unique dialogue involving the character Javik during a cutscene at the asari homeworld of Thessia in Mass Effect 3, which is only available if From Ashes is installed.

Mass Effect 3: From Ashes is a downloadable content pack for the 2012 action role-playing video game Mass Effect 3. Set within the Milky Way galaxy during the 22nd century, the player assumes the role of an elite human soldier, Commander Shepard, who is summoned along with the crew of The Normandy-SR2 starship for a priority-class mission to the human colony of Eden Prime, the site of a major plot point in the first Mass Effect. The player may commence the mission, which is integrated into the main game without any special markers indicating its status as DLC content, anytime after Shepard departs the Citadel on The Normandy to rally support from other species to retake Earth early in the narrative of Mass Effect 3.

Shepard and asari scientist Liara T'Soni discover an intact stasis pod containing a live Prothean shortly after their arrival in Eden Prime, and must battle Cerberus ground forces as well as interpret archived video footage that contains the necessary codes to open the stasis pod. Following the completion of the mission, the Prothean endling known as Javik joins Shepard's squad; he utilizes a combination of biotic abilities and gunplay in combat. The pack integrates new conversation options, cutscenes, and ambient dialogue involving Javik into the main game. The pack also adds a Prothean-themed energy weapon called a particle rifle, a new biotic ability called Slam, as well as cosmetic options to customize the appearance of all squad members.

== Development and release ==
From Ashes was developed by BioWare and published by Electronic Arts. Javik was originally cut from Mass Effect 3 due to time constraints during the game's developmental cycle, and is reintroduced through the DLC pack as its featured companion character. From Ashes was completed while the main game was still in certification and is not available on the disc; according to a press release issued by EA, "certain framework elements and character models needed to be put on disc" in order to "seamlessly integrate Javik into the core campaign", in a manner similar to the DLC packs which added the companion characters Zaeed Massani and Kasumi Goto into Mass Effect 2. According to the project director of Mass Effect 3, Casey Hudson, it took about three months for the main game to move from the "content complete" stage, for the developers to "bug-fix, certify, manufacture, and ship game discs"; From Ashes was completed within the three-month period.

In late February 2012, information about the pack was mistakenly published on the official Xbox website. BioWare producer Mike Gamble would later confirm that From Ashes is available on the same day as the launch date of Mass Effect 3, March 6, 2012, as a paid download. From Ashes is complimentary for players who purchased Mass Effect 3 Collector’s Edition, and the Wii U version of Mass Effect 3 includes the pack by default.

== Reception ==
Reception

Aggregate score
Aggregator	Score
Metacritic	59/100 (Xbox 360)

Review scores
Publication	Score
Electronic Gaming Monthly	5/10
Official Xbox Magazine (UK)	4/10
Official Xbox Magazine (US)	5.5/10
Play	7.8/10
VideoGamer.com	8/10
Eurogamer Germany	6/10

According to the review aggregator Metacritic, the Xbox 360 version of Mass Effect 3: From Ashes received "mixed or average reviews" from video game publications. PLAY gave a positive review, and summarized that From Ashes is good for Mass Effect fans wanting more back story, though it would be "a little unremarkable for everyone else". Similarly, Benjamin Jakobs from Eurogamer found that the pack does not add anything relevant to the main plot, though the pack's additional features met his expectations. Electronic Gaming Monthly praised the quality of the side story as well as Javik's characterization, but argued that "he should have just been included in the game in the first place, not a $10 Day 1 add-on". Other sources, like Videogamer.com and the Official Xbox Magazine, compared it unfavorably to BioWare's previous DLC offerings like Mass Effect 2: Lair of the Shadow Broker. The UK edition of the Official Xbox Magazine rated the pack with a negative score and advised its readers to "steer well clear of this cheeky cash-grab".

"Stand in the ashes of a trillion dead souls and ask the ghosts if honor matters. The silence is your answer."

— Javik, Mass Effect 3

Joe Juba from Game Informer felt that Javik as well as the conversation that follows his rescue are without a doubt the "star attractions" of the pack. Alec Meer from Rock, Paper, Shotgun noted that he liked Javik's "quiet snobbery", "his struggle to hide his pain" over the extinction of his entire species, as well as his vaguely West African accented voice, although Javik's very presence had undermined "much of the mystique that's built up around the Protheans over the last two games" in his opinion. One of Javik's lines from the pack is regarded by Gamesradar as one of the best video game quotes of all time.

=== Controversy ===
The decision to release From Ashes as a paid DLC on the same date as the launch of Mass Effect 3 was controversial and generated criticism from critics and players. Shortly after the pack's release, one player uploaded a video on YouTube with alleged proof that the contents of From Ashes are included on the disc but deliberately withheld by the publisher unless an additional amount of money to use the content is paid, even though work has been completed prior to the release date. Wes Fenlon from PC Gamer commented that most of his colleagues did not experience any interactions with Javik when they first played Mass Effect 3 following its launch, as they did not pay extra for the DLC pack. He noted that it reflects poorly on the developers that the one character who could offer significant insight into Prothean race, culture and history was locked behind a paywall, even if said character is not pivotal to the plot of Mass Effect 3.

Several BioWare staff members, including Hudson and Gamble, publicly defended the business practice. At the 2012 Game Developers Conference (GDC), game designer and former BioWare staff Christina Norman asked players to judge the DLC on the quality of its content as opposed to the timing of its release. Electronic Arts eventually responded with a press release, and clarified that for the player to access the contents of the pack, an additional download of about 600 megabytes in size that is not on the disc is required.

The presence of Day-One DLC in many of the video games EA published was identified as a factor behind its placement as the "worst company in America" according to a 2012 polling held by Consumerist.
