= Mass Effect 2: Overlord =

2010 downloadable content

- Developer: BioWare
- Publishers: Electronic Arts; Microsoft Game Studios (X360)
- Composer: Christopher Lennertz
- Series: Mass Effect
- Engine: Unreal Engine 3
- Platforms: Microsoft Windows; Xbox 360; PlayStation 3
- Release: Windows, Xbox 360; June 15, 2010; PlayStation 3 January 18, 2011
- Genres: Action role-playing, third-person shooter
- Mode: Single-player

Mass Effect 2: Overlord is a downloadable content pack developed by BioWare and published by Electronic Arts and Microsoft Game Studios for the 2010 action role-playing video game Mass Effect 2. It was released for Microsoft Windows and Xbox 360 on June 15, 2010. It was also included in the PlayStation 3 version of Mass Effect 2, which was released in 2011 by Electronic Arts. Set on a remote Earth-like planet during the 22nd century, Overlord follows the events of an experimental virtual intelligence that has gone rogue after a scientist interfaced his autistic brother's mind with it.

Overlord features a new series of missions involving both on-foot squad-based combat and planetary exploration aboard a hovering vehicle called the Hammerhead. Its vehicle exploration aspect was designed to be similar to that of the Mako carrier in the original Mass Effect. Overlord received positive reviews from critics, who praised its tense atmosphere and open-ended exploration, but criticized the Hammerhead's simplistic mechanics. In 2021, Overlord was remastered as part of the Mass Effect Legendary Edition.

== Gameplay ==
Between missions, the player can explore a planet aboard a hovering vehicle.

Mass Effect 2: Overlord is a downloadable content pack for the 2010 action role-playing video game Mass Effect 2. Set on a remote Earth-like planet called Aite during the 22nd century, it follows the events of an experimental virtual intelligence that has gone rogue. The player assumes the role of Commander Shepard, an elite human soldier who is ordered by Dr. Gavin Archer to gain access to the station where the virtual intelligence is kept in lockdown and shut it down. Shepard succeeds, but learns that Archer had been trying to gain influence over a hostile race of networked artificial intelligences by interfacing his autistic brother's mind with the virtual intelligence. Shepard is then given the option to either take his brother to a specialized academy or leave him at the station with Archer.

Overlord comprises a series of missions that take place in different facilities on the surface of Aite and that involve on-foot squad-based combat. It unfolds in a nonlinear manner and encourages planetary exploration. To go from one mission to another, the player must use a hovering vehicle called the Hammerhead. The player can freely explore Aite aboard the vehicle and change squad members before starting a mission. There is a side-quest that requires the player to collect several data packs on the planet. The Hammerhead has the ability to jump over obstacles to reach certain areas and is armed with a gun that the player can use to destroy hostile targets over the planet. Overlord also includes three in-game upgrades, which allow the player to enhance certain aspects of the game's weapons and armor, as well as two achievements.

== Development and release ==
Overlord was developed by BioWare and published by Electronic Arts and Microsoft Game Studios. During development of Mass Effect 2, Bioware stated that downloadable content was becoming a fundamental part of the company's overall philosophy. The pack was announced to be in development on May 13, 2010. BioWare executive producer Casey Hudson stated that Overlord was the "biggest downloadable content pack yet" and confirmed that they would not introduce more squad members to the game like they did with previous packs. The developers focused on exploration and vehicle platforming, similar to that found in Mass Effect 2's earlier downloadable content pack Firewalker. Because vehicle exploration had already been introduced in the original Mass Effect with the Mako carrier, Hudson called Overlord "a throwback to how some of the exploration worked in [the first] Mass Effect." The soundtrack was composed by Christopher Lennertz.

Overlord was released on June 15, 2010, for Microsoft Windows and Xbox 360. Like Mass Effect 2's other downloadable content packs Kasumi – Stolen Memory and Lair of the Shadow Broker, Overlord is freely included in the PlayStation 3 version of the game, which was released on January 18, 2011. In 2021, the pack was remastered as part of the Mass Effect Legendary Edition.

== Reception ==
Reception

Aggregate score
Aggregator	Score
Metacritic	86/100 (PC); 81/100 (X360)

Review scores
Publication	Score
Eurogamer	8/10
GameRevolution	B+
GameSpot	8.5/10
IGN	9/10
GameCritics.com	8/10

Overlord received positive reviews from critics. Reviewer Erik Brudvig of IGN described it as "one of the best series of missions that the franchise has yet seen." Similarly, reviewer Dan Whitehead of Eurogamer opined that the pack "never lets one gameplay element dominate for too long, leavening the expected duck-and-cover combat with openworld exploration and a dash of environmental puzzling, all wrapped up in a story that builds to a satisfying and pathos-heavy finale." GameSpot's Kevin VanOrd credited the on-foot action, stating that "a few of the larger environments let you take on [enemies] from multiple angles, which are a nice change from the straight-on encounters that typify most of Mass Effect 2's battles." He also praised the final boss battle, which he felt exceeded that of the main game.

Critics generally praised the vehicular sections of the mission. Eurogamer felt that the Hammerhead "responds well to the terrain, with just the right mix of weight and bounciness." IGN considered it an improvement over the Mako carrier featured in the original Mass Effect. Brad Gallaway of GameCritics, who gave the main game a mixed review, was satisfied with its inclusion and felt that BioWare "managed to incorporate all of the various aspects of Mass Effect together in a way [he] felt was largely lacking in the core adventure and the previous add-ons." GameRevolution's Eduardo Reboucas stated similar pros, but admitted that jumping on platforms with the Hammerhead goes against the nature of the game. Likewise, VanOrd felt that the Hammerhead goes underutilized due to its exclusive use in the pack. Some reviewers also criticized the simplistic vehicular combat, comparing it unfavorably with that of the original Mass Effect.

VanOrd gave high marks to the pack's frightening atmosphere, stating that "haunting new music instills a palpable sense of tension, and the dark interior spaces provide a sinister contrast to the shimmering waterfalls and scorching lava rivers on the planet's surface." The IGN review observed that the visuals and audio surpass many side quests of the main game. Critics also highlighted very positively the story. Eurogamer opined that the ending was effective and unexpected, while VanOrd remarked that the ending cutscene "features some uncomfortable images that will linger in your mind even after you've returned to the [main game]." Despite evaluating the pack's short length, VanOrd concluded that Overlord "is one downloadable delight Mass Effect 2 fans shouldn't miss."

Retrospectively, Overlord was criticized for dehumanizing an autistic character. Writing for Vice, editor M. Wesley Alvey explained that, while the story offers an option for players to take David to a specialized academy, it does not offer an option to punish Gavin for experimenting on his brother. The editor also argued that such a choice should have been added to the Mass Effect Legendary Edition of the game, given that other adjustments, such as altering the camera angles that rest directly behind a woman's bottom in the base game, had been made.
