= Mass Effect 2: Arrival =

2011 downloadable content

- Developer: BioWare
- Publishers: Electronic Arts; Microsoft Game Studios (X360)
- Composers: Cris Velasco; Sascha Dikiciyan
- Series: Mass Effect
- Engine: Unreal Engine 3
- Platforms: Microsoft Windows; PlayStation 3 Xbox 360
- Release: March 29, 2011
- Genres: Action role-playing, third-person shooter
- Mode: Single-player

Mass Effect 2: Arrival is a downloadable content pack developed by BioWare and published by Electronic Arts and Microsoft Game Studios for the 2010 action role-playing video game Mass Effect 2. It was released for Microsoft Windows, PlayStation 3, and Xbox 360 in March 29, 2011. Set within the Milky Way galaxy during the 22nd century, Arrival follows the story of Commander Shepard, an elite human soldier who must stop an imminent invasion of a highly advanced machine race of synthetic-organic starships that plan to conquer the galaxy.

Arrival is the last downloadable content pack that was released for Mass Effect 2 and acts as a bridge for Mass Effect 3. It received generally mixed reviews from critics, who criticized the gameplay for its strong emphasis on linear combat sequences, and the story and characters for their vagueness. At the 2011 Spike Video Game Awards, Arrival was nominated for Best DLC (downloadable content). In 2021, the pack was remastered as part of the Mass Effect Legendary Edition.

== Gameplay ==
Mass Effect 2: Arrival is a downloadable content pack for the 2010 action role-playing video game Mass Effect 2. Set within the Milky Way galaxy during the 22nd century, it follows the events of an imminent invasion of a highly advanced machine race of synthetic-organic starships that plan to conquer the galaxy through the Alpha Relay, a mass transit device which enables interstellar travel. The player assumes the role of Commander Shepard, an elite human soldier who ultimately prevents the invasion by colliding an asteroid into the Alpha Relay. Shepard's actions have severe consequences and set the stage for the sequel Mass Effect 3.

Arrival is split into two acts, each located in a remote globular cluster. The first act takes place in a rain-drenched prison, while the second one takes place in a research base. Unlike Mass Effect 2, where the player is assisted by two squad members that are controlled by the game's artificial intelligence, Arrival involves the player fighting solo almost the entire time. Although the gameplay is mostly centered on corridor-based combat, the beginning of the first act features stealth elements as it is possible to progress without being detected by enemies. Arrival also includes three in-game upgrades, which allow the player to enhance certain aspects of the game's weapons and armor, as well as three achievements.

== Development and release ==
This concept art illustrates the originally suggested underwater setting.

Arrival was developed by BioWare and published by Electronic Arts and Microsoft Game Studios. It was the last title in the Mass Effect series that was published by Microsoft. During development of Mass Effect 2, Bioware stated that downloadable content was becoming a fundamental part of the company's overall philosophy. The pack was accidentally leaked on February 21, 2011, by the addition of three new achievements in a patch for the PlayStation 3 version of Mass Effect 2. BioWare remarked that the addition of the achievements was intentional, but assumed players would not notice. The pack was formally announced on March 14, 2011, via a brand new screenshot. As the final downloadable content pack for Mass Effect 2, Arrival acts as a bridge for Mass Effect 3. Although the research base where most of the pack's events take place is located on an asteroid, early plans suggested that it would be set on an ocean planet. The base would be underwater and Shepard would reach the main level by submarine. Each section of the base would be in different "containers" and would have a similar sense to James Cameron's 1989 film The Abyss.

The soundtrack was composed by Sonic Mayhem duo Sascha Dikiciyan and Cris Velasco, the same composers that penned the music from Mass Effect 2's earlier downloadable content Kasumi – Stolen Memory. Arrival was released on March 29, 2011, for Microsoft Windows, PlayStation 3, and Xbox 360. In 2021, the pack was remastered as part of the Mass Effect Legendary Edition.

== Reception ==
Reception

Aggregate score
Aggregator	Score
Metacritic	63/100 (PC); 68/100 (PS3); 65/100 (X360)

Review scores
Publication	Score
Destructoid	8/10
Eurogamer	5/10
GameRevolution	C
GameSpot	5.0/10
IGN	7.0/10
GameCritics.com	4/10

Arrival received generally mixed reviews from critics. GameSpot editor Kevin VanOrd called Arrival "a disappointing conclusion to a beloved series' second chapter." He stated that the pack lacks elements of choice and character development, which are core features of the Mass Effect series. He nonetheless found the atmospheric environments still praiseworthy, especially the final battleground, which "seems to break the laws of physics but nonetheless gives the shooting excellent visual context." Kristine Steimer of IGN enjoyed the challenge of fighting alone, as it "never bordered on frustrating", but admitted the pack mainly consisted of linear combat sequences.

GameRevolution's Eduardo Reboucas criticized the vagueness of the story, stating that "characters don't offer a lot of explanation and the little that is given seems more like a hastily put-together excuse to shoot up some fools and push some buttons on the way." He also said that none of the conversation paths influence the game, giving no sense of closure or importance. Similarly, Maurice Tan of Destructoid criticized the ending sacrifice for lacking "a good reason to really care about it", but still considered Arrival a worthwhile purchase due to its potential impact on Mass Effect 3. Despite the general criticism of the story, the atmospheric environments were praised, with GameRevolution noting that "you'll never be bored by the visuals".

Dan Whitehead of Eurogamer highlighted positively the first act and felt that it does "a decent job of allowing you to feel like you're being stealthy as you negotiate your way past guards, usually by looking around for not-very-hidden alternate routes." However, he criticized the final two thirds for being very linear and repetitive, and also reacted negatively to the game's insistence on having to fight solo almost the entire time. He explained that Mass Effect 2 is a squad game, where players "[use] fluid team strategy to cope with different situations", but fighting solo means that players "have to deal with every encounter in the exact same way." Brad Gallaway, reviewer of GameCritics, concluded that the pack's relatively short length and included extras were not enough to justify its price tag.

At the 2011 Spike Video Game Awards, Arrival was nominated for Best DLC (downloadable content), but lost to Portal 2: Peer Review.
