= Mass Effect =

Science fiction media franchise

- Logo since 2017
- Genres: Action role-playing; Science fiction video game; Third-person shooter
- Developers: BioWare; Edge of Reality; Demiurge Studios; Straight Right
- Publishers: Microsoft Game Studios (2007–11); Electronic Arts (2010–26)
- Creator: Casey Hudson
- Platforms: Xbox 360; Microsoft Windows; iOS; PlayStation 3; Android; Windows Phone; Wii U; PlayStation 4; Xbox One
- First release: Mass Effect; November 20, 2007
- Latest release: Mass Effect Legendary Edition; May 14, 2021

Mass Effect is a military science fiction media franchise created by Casey Hudson. The franchise depicts a distant future where humanity and several alien civilizations have colonized the galaxy using technology left behind by advanced precursor civilizations.

The franchise originated in a series of video games developed by BioWare and originally published by Microsoft Game Studios on the first two games and its expansions. Later on, the series was taken over by Electronic Arts through its acquisition of BioWare. Each installment is a third-person shooter with role-playing elements. The first three games form a trilogy in which the player character, Commander Shepard, attempts to save the Milky Way galaxy from a race of ancient, hibernating machines known as the Reapers. The inaugural video game in the series, Mass Effect (2007), follows Shepard's investigation of Saren Arterius, one of the Reapers' agents. Mass Effect 2 (2010) begins two years later and sees Shepard's forces battling the Collectors, an alien race abducting human colonies to facilitate the Reapers' return. The original trilogy's final installment, Mass Effect 3 (2012), depicts a war between the Reapers and the rest of the galaxy. A fourth game, Mass Effect: Andromeda (2017), featured a new setting and cast of characters, and a fifth was in active development before being cancelled in 2026 after BioWare was closed.

The original trilogy was met with commercial success as well as acclaim. Critics praised the game's narrative, characters, voice acting, world building, and emphasis on player choice. The ending of Mass Effect 3 drew widespread criticism for being an unsatisfying conclusion to the trilogy, prompting Electronic Arts to release an expanded cut with additional cutscenes. Mass Effect: Andromeda received mixed reviews. Praise was directed at the game's visuals and combat, but the game drew criticism for technical issues and its plot.

The series has generated attention and discussion about its representation of same-sex relationships and sexual minorities. It also originated the dialogue wheel, a mechanic similar to dialogue trees, enabling players to dynamically steer conversations by selecting from a number of preset choices; the feature has since seen widespread use in other role-playing video games. The success of the video game series spawned adaptations in other media, including novels, comics, and an animated film.

== Setting ==
The Mass Effect original trilogy takes place in the Milky Way towards the end of the 22nd century. In 2148, humanity discovered an alien outpost on Mars, and learned that Charon is actually an alien artifact known as a "mass relay" that enables faster-than-light travel to other mass relays located across the galaxy. These discoveries drastically increased the enhancement rate of humanity's technology.

Humanity comes into contact with numerous other space-faring alien species, some far more advanced than humans. Humanity's first encounter resulted in the First Contact War, but the Council, a ruling body for the galaxy, intervened to achieve peace and welcomed humanity. The main species encountered by humanity include the Asari, a species of mono-gendered beings closely resembling human women; the Salarians, an amphibious species with considerable technological and intellectual prowess and an extremely high metabolism; and the Turians, a heavily militaristic race of raptor-like avian humanoids who fought humanity in the First Contact War.

The center of the Council's governing power is the Citadel, another artifact and a massive space station that, like the mass relays, were believed to be made by a race known as the Protheans, who were believed to be the progenitor race for all species but had long since disappeared. Over the next few decades, humanity is given access to new technology, allowing them to colonize new planets, and they are made part of the Citadel Security (C-Sec) forces, a highly regarded position that other species had been long waiting for and take resentment over. Numerous other inter-species conflicts remain active at the time of the first game, results of past wars and conflicts.

The first three games center on the character of Commander Shepard (whose gender and personality are determined by the player), a leading Special Forces soldier in Earth's Systems Alliance space force, the Systems Alliance Navy. After an Earth colony discovers a new Prothean artifact, it is attacked by an unknown vessel, and the Council names Shepard its first human SPECTRE (Special Tactics and Reconnaissance), an elite agent with associated authority and impunity, to investigate the incident.

Shepard comes in contact with the artifact and has a vision of war and death across the galaxy. Following their vision, Shepard discovers that the strange craft is one of thousands of artificial lifeforms called Reapers, and learns that every fifty-thousand years, the Reapers scour the Milky Way and eliminate all higher forms of life, leaving the younger species to advance and thrive until the next cycle as to prevent constant war and chaos, part of what the Protheans had left behind along with their artifacts. The appearance of the Reapers in this cycle is being manipulated by numerous forces, including a human-centrist terrorist organization known as Cerberus led by the Illusive Man who believe they can control the Reapers and use them for humanity's benefit. Shepard and their allies discover the Citadel is key to ending the Reapers' cycle and determining the fate of the galaxy.

The fourth game takes place in the Heleus Cluster of the Andromeda galaxy, 634 years after the events of its predecessor. In the midst of events of the first three games, the combined races of the Milky Way sent a number of ships to Andromeda to establish the Nexus, a space-borne operations base and a number of colonies to accept future colonists once contact is established. After over 600 years of travel in cryogenic stasis, they arrive to find the Heleus Cluster in brutal conflict between two native races: the Kett, a barbaric race obsessed with assimilating the traits of other sentient species through a process known as "exaltation"; and the Angara, an emotionally charged humanoid species whose civilization has recently been targeted and nearly decimated by the Kett.

The Heleus Cluster is also the location of a series of ruins predating an advanced, spacefaring race known as the Jardaan. The Jardaan made use of powerful terraforming technologies to colonize worlds in the Heleus Cluster, which was otherwise extremely hazardous and naturally unsustainable for life. They later fled from the Heleus Cluster three centuries before the arrival of the Milky Way races, when a protracted battle against an unknown enemy faction resulted in the usage of a weapon of mass destruction aboard a Jardaan space station. The weapon's activation unleashed a cataclysmic energy phenomenon known as the Scourge, which spread across the cluster and greatly damaged the Jardaan's terraforming systems. After the Jardaan left, the Angara, genetically engineered creations of the elder race, began to develop their own civilization before falling under attack by the encroaching Kett.

With the Milky Way species' arrival, it becomes the responsibility of Pathfinder Ryder (who, like Shepard, is also customizable by the player) and their allies to shut down the malfunctioning terraforming systems, deal with the Kett and Angara attacks, and make planets habitable for colonization.

== Gameplay ==
While various features of gameplay varied across the series, the Mass Effect games are action role-playing games. The player customizes their version of the game's main character (Shepard for the first three games, and Ryder for Mass Effect: Andromeda) based on physical appearance, background, and one of six character classes, each class centered around one or two specializations in combat, technology, or "biotic" skills (similar to mutant abilities in various franchises.) This establishes a skill tree that the player can advance through as their character gains experience levels through completing missions. Each game generally follows a main story pathway with points of branching narratives and multiple side missions, allowing the player to proceed through the game as they desire. Both story and optional missions most often involve using their ship to travel via the mass relay to remote star systems and explore planets to find target objectives.

When exploring planets, the player has the option to bring up to two of their crew members with them, who generally act autonomously but can be given specific orders by the player. In missions, the player can explore an area to find information, discover lootable objects with new gear or in-game currency, non-playable characters to talk to, and key mission items that are to be recovered. Frequently, the player will enter combat, which plays out as a third-person shooter, with the player and their allies using a combination of their weapons and combat, tech, and biotic powers along with tactic use of the environment to defeat opponents. There are six different types of weapons: assault rifles, grenades, sniper rifles, shotguns, pistols, and in later games, heavy weapons (i.e. grenade launchers, rocket launchers, flamethrowers, or heavy machine guns). Due to these weapons being collapsible for easy storage, it is possible for a player to carry all five weapons at once and alternate between them depending on their position, enemy type, and situation. Melee weapons include fists, the butt of a gun, or in later games, a condensed transparent silicon-carbide dagger called an Omni-blade.

Through story encounters and missions, the player meets a number of non-player characters and engages in dialogue trees with them to learn information and progress the story. This is presented through what BioWare called a Dialogue Wheel, with the player-character reply options shown as choices extending radially outward from a circle at the bottom of the screen. Most of these choices are simple questions and responses, but in some dialogues, they offer additional choices that either influence how the game plays out from there, or are as a result from those previous choices. In the first three games, these choices influenced the player-character's morality, putting them on the path of a Paragon or Renegade, indicated by color and positioning on the Dialogue Wheel. With the second and third game, it became possible to select these choices during the non-player's character dialog, resulting in an interruption of the action that could have even larger ramifications. The player's choices of Paragon or Renegade could change how some parts of the story progressed and could limit choices of allies they could gain later in the game or the ability to access powerful gear. Cinematic designer John Ebenger stated in 2020 that only about 8% of the players chose the Renegade route across the first three games, and jokingly lamented about the amount of effort they had put into some of the Renegade cinematics. In Andromeda, BioWare replaced the Paragon/Renegade distinctions, which were tied more to the Shepard character, to a new system based on four ideals of emotional, logical, casual, and professional attitudes.

Among notable side missions in the series include the various romancing options with the main character's crewmates: these included both hetero- and homosexual relationships since the player-character's gender was selectable, as well as inter-species options. Players could work to improve their relationship with these characters through dialogue options, providing them gifts, or completing various side missions specific to each character. Successfully romancing a character would typically lead to scenes leading up to a sexual encounter though otherwise not showing anything inappropriate for the game's rating. These options had created some controversy for the first game on release with mainstream reporters critical of the sexual content of the game.

== Games ==
Year	Title	Developer	Platform(s)			
Main Titles
2007	Mass Effect (Note: The PlayStation 3 and Windows versions of Mass Effect were ported by Edge of Reality and Demiurge Studios respectively.)	BioWare	Xbox 360	PlayStation 3	Microsoft Windows	
2010	Mass Effect 2 (Note: Previously available on Sony's PlayStation Now streaming service. Removed as of April 2020.)	BioWare	Xbox 360	PlayStation 3	Microsoft Windows	
2012	Mass Effect 3 (Note: Mass Effect 3: Special Edition was ported by Straight Right.)	BioWare	Xbox 360	PlayStation 3	Microsoft Windows	Wii U
2017	Mass Effect: Andromeda	BioWare	Xbox One	PlayStation 4	Microsoft Windows	
Compilations
2012	Mass Effect Trilogy	BioWare	Xbox 360	PlayStation 3	Microsoft Windows	
2021	Mass Effect Legendary Edition	BioWare	Xbox One	PlayStation 4	Microsoft Windows	
Mobile Titles
2009	Mass Effect Galaxy (Note: Removed from the App Store.)	BioWare	iOS			
2012	Mass Effect Infiltrator (Note: Removed from all mobile app storefronts.)	IronMonkey Studios	iOS	Android	Windows Phone	BlackBerry 10

=== Main series ===
Release timeline Main series in bold
2007	**Mass Effect**
2008
2009	Mass Effect Galaxy
2010	**Mass Effect 2**
2011
2012	**Mass Effect 3**
2012	Mass Effect Trilogy
2012	Mass Effect Infiltrator
2013–2016
2017	**Mass Effect: Andromeda**
2018–2020
2021	Mass Effect Legendary Edition

==== Mass Effect ====
Mass Effect (2007), the first game in the series, was originally created as an exclusive title for the Xbox 360 but was later ported to Windows by Demiurge Studios in 2008, and to the PlayStation 3 by Edge of Reality in 2012. The game focuses on the protagonist, Commander Shepard, and their quest to stop the rogue Spectre Saren Arterius from leading an army of sentient machines, called the Geth, to conquer the galaxy. During pursuit of Saren, Shepard develops key relationships with other characters, primarily their squad team members, all while learning of a far greater threat in the form of the Reapers. Saren has been mentally enslaved by the Reaper vanguard Sovereign, and sent into Citadel Space to initiate the purge of all advanced organic life in the galaxy, a cycle repeated by the Reapers every 50,000 years.

Two downloadable content packs, Bring Down The Sky and Pinnacle Station, were released in 2008 and 2009, respectively.

==== Mass Effect 2 ====
Mass Effect 2, the second main game in the series, was released on January 26, 2010, in North America and January 29 in Europe for Windows and Xbox 360. A great deal of secrecy surrounded the game prior to launch, with few details emerging other than Casey Hudson, Project Director for BioWare, stating that "players should keep their save files, because decisions made by the player in the first game will continue to have influences on their character in the sequel." The game takes place two years after the events of Mass Effect. Human colonies are being attacked, their colonists disappearing without a trace. The game's protagonist, Commander Shepard, is forced into an uneasy alliance with the pro-Human paramilitary organization, Cerberus, in an effort to discover the cause. Evidence emerges pointing to the "Collectors," an advanced, enigmatic race of insect-like humanoids. Adding to the threat is the revelation that the Collectors are working for the Reapers. Shepard sets out on a "suicide mission" to stop the Collectors, accompanied by a hand-picked team of soldiers, assassins, mercenaries, and specialists. Mass Effect 2 has received overwhelming critical and public praise since its release, for its characters, storyline, voice acting, and refined combat and gameplay with many critics calling it a major improvement over the original and an easy Game of the Year contender despite its January release. At Gamescom 2010, it was announced that a PlayStation 3 version would become available, which was released on January 18, 2011.

Seven episodic expansions were released as downloadable content, with Normandy Crash Site, Zaeed – The Price of Revenge, Firewalker, Kasumi – Stolen Memory, Overlord, and Lair of the Shadow Broker coming in 2010, followed by Arrival in 2011.

==== Mass Effect 3 ====
Mass Effect 3, the third installment in the original trilogy, was released on March 6, 2012. Casey Hudson commented that Mass Effect 3 "will be easier [to develop] because we don't have to worry about continuity into the next one." However, decisions are routinely imported from the two previous titles to Mass Effect 3 in order to maintain continuity within the series. In the final chapter of the trilogy, the Reapers have returned in force, and have begun their purge of the galaxy, attacking Earth. During this attack Commander Shepard is on Earth and forced to flee. After fleeing Earth, Commander Shepard must hurry and rally the advanced races of the galaxy to make one final stand, not only to save Earth, but also to break a cycle that has continued for millions of years. The first official trailer was unveiled on December 11, 2010, during the Spike TV Video Game Awards. It was the first title in the main series without involvement from Microsoft Game Studios and released on the same date for both Xbox 360 and PlayStation 3.

Four story-focused episodic expansions were released as downloadable content, with From Ashes, Leviathan, and Omega being released in 2012, followed by the final expansion, Citadel, in 2013. There were also five free DLC packs released for the multiplayer component, Resurgence, Rebellion, Earth, and Retaliation in 2012 and Reckoning in 2013, collectively adding thirty playable characters, dozens of new weapons and abilities, seven new maps, and a new enemy faction to complement the base game's three, among other content.

==== Mass Effect: Andromeda ====
Mass Effect: Andromeda, the first game in a new series, and the fourth major installment overall in the franchise, was revealed at E3 2015. It was released on March 21, 2017. The title utilizes DICE's Frostbite 3 engine and was released for PlayStation 4, Windows and Xbox One. Andromeda is the first game in the series to feature an open world environment. Set during the 29th century, the player's character is either Sara or Scott Ryder, designated as a Pathfinder – an operative tasked with discovering new planets in the Andromeda Galaxy on behalf of their species.

Unlike previous installments, Andromeda did not receive single player expansions, though the multiplayer component did receive new content in various updates in 2017 which added new weapons, abilities, maps, and playable characters.

==== Cancelled sequel ====
As part of the 2020 "N7 Day," BioWare affirmed that a new Mass Effect was in development at the studio. An announcement trailer was released on 11 December 2020, hinting at a sequel to the original trilogy and featuring original trilogy character Liara T'Soni. The new entry is also confirmed to be run on the Epic Games Unreal Engine, which was used in each game of the original trilogy, instead of EA internal Frostbite engine which was used for Andromeda.

The game was cancelled in 2026 following the closure of BioWare as part of layoffs at Electronic Arts. A day following the announcement, an early pre-production concept trailer for the game was leaked online entitled Mass Effect: Universe.

=== Mobile games ===
==== Mass Effect Galaxy ====
Mass Effect Galaxy is set between the events of Mass Effect and Mass Effect 2 and exclusively on the iOS platform. The story is focused around a backstory featuring two characters who appear as squad members in Mass Effect 2: Jacob Taylor and Miranda Lawson. When the passenger liner Arcturian Jade is attacked by batarian raiders with Jacob on it, he takes on the task of defending the ship. After safely arriving at their destination on the Citadel, Jacob's former CO contacts him about an undercover Alliance operation in the Nemean Abyss to investigate the batarians' increasingly aggressive activities. It has since been removed from the iOS App Store.

==== Mass Effect Infiltrator ====
Mass Effect Infiltrator is a third-person shooter released on the Android, BlackBerry 10, iOS and Windows Phone 8 platforms. The story for Infiltrator involves Randall Ezno, a Cerberus agent, who discovers Cerberus's cruelty and goes rogue, killing Cerberus troopers and freeing prisoners from a hostile base. Players will "receive rewards" for collecting evidence of Cerberus' crimes. According to EA, "Every completed rescue and intelligence discovery in Infiltrator will increase a player's Galactic Readiness rating directly through the 'Galaxy at War' system in Mass Effect 3." It has since been removed from all mobile app storefronts.

=== Compilations ===
==== Mass Effect Trilogy ====
Mass Effect Trilogy is a compilation featuring the first three games of the series, released on November 6, 2012 for Windows and Xbox 360 and December 4, 2012 for PlayStation 3. For the PlayStation 3 version, Trilogy also includes the downloadable content for the first two games: Bring Down the Sky for Mass Effect, and Cerberus Network content for Mass Effect 2 along with the Kasumi – Stolen Memory, Overlord and Lair of the Shadow Broker DLC's. The Xbox 360 version includes all DLC that came with the original games, with Cerberus Network for Mass Effect 2 and Mass Effect 3 remaining unchanged. The PC version is the same as Xbox 360, except both Bring Down the Sky and Pinnacle Station are available for free as per the standalone purchase of the PC version.

==== Mass Effect Legendary Edition ====
Mass Effect Legendary Edition was officially announced on November 7, 2020 or "N7 Day." The goal of the remaster was "not to remake or reimagine the original games, but to modernize the experience so that fans and new players can experience the original work in its best possible form." The remaster also features almost all previously released downloadable content, enhanced "textures, shaders, models, effects, and technical features of three enormous games." Due to Mass Effect 1's age, it received the most extensive work for the Legendary Edition, which BioWare compared to the quality of a remake, while stating that the other two games were still remasters. The remaster was released on May 14, 2021 for the Xbox One, PlayStation 4, and Windows.

== Apps ==
Year	Title	Developer	Platform(s)	
2012	Mass Effect Datapad (Note: Delisted from mobile app stores.)	BioWare	iOS	Android
2017	Mass Effect: Andromeda APEX HQ	BioWare	iOS	Android

=== Mass Effect: Datapad ===
Mass Effect: Datapad was a free app for iOS devices. Datapad allows players to check the status of the galaxy map in Mass Effect 3 and receive messages from characters. Datapad contains information about the characters, races, vehicles, weapons, and storyline of the Mass Effect universe, as well as mini-games that interact with the Mass Effect 3 'Galaxy at War' system. It was removed from the iOS App Store and the Google Play Store on June 5, 2013.

=== Mass Effect: Andromeda APEX HQ ===
APEX HQ is the official companion app for the Mass Effect: Andromeda multiplayer. Supported by iOS and Android devices, APEX HQ was released on March 15 in Canada, Ireland, Romania and Singapore, and worldwide on March 20, 2017. Through APEX HQ, players can view their progress in multiplayer, equip characters, assign skill points, manage Strike Teams, and access their friend list. The app cannot be used while signed into the game.

== Other media ==
=== Novels ===
Original trilogy tie-in novels published by Del Rey Books:

- Mass Effect: Revelation (2007), by Drew Karpyshyn: The first novel based on Mass Effect, the plot is centred around then-Lieutenant David Anderson and tells the story of how he came to know Saren as well as the beginning of his relationship with Kahlee Sanders. It expands on the history of the Mass Effect universe and reveals in detail how Anderson failed to become the first human Spectre.
- Mass Effect: Ascension (2008), by Drew Karpyshyn: The second novel based on Mass Effect, the plot centres around protagonist Paul Grayson, a member of Cerberus, who is in charge of raising a biotic girl named Gillian. It is set some two months after the ending events of the first game.
- Mass Effect: Retribution (2010), by Drew Karpyshyn: On July 27, 2010, BioWare released the third Mass Effect novel, a sequel to Mass Effect 2 and Mass Effect: Ascension.
- Mass Effect: Deception (2012), by William C. Dietz: The fourth Mass Effect novel, it centres on Gillian Grayson. Response to the novel has been largely negative due to inconsistencies with lore and characterization, prompting fans to petition BioWare to disregard the novel as canon. In response, BioWare and Del Rey announced that a number of changes would be made in future editions.

Mass Effect: Andromeda tie-in novels published by Titan Books:

- Mass Effect: Nexus Uprising (2017), by Jason M. Hough and K. C. Alexander: The novel is the first of three intended to weave directly into Mass Effect: Andromeda, taking place "concurrently with the adventure of the game itself".
- Mass Effect: Initiation (2017) by N. K. Jemisin and Mac Walters: This is the second novel in the Mass Effect: Andromeda book trilogy.
- Mass Effect: Annihilation (2018) by Catherynne M. Valente: This is the third and final novel in the Mass Effect: Andromeda book trilogy.

=== Art books ===
- Art of Mass Effect (2007), published by Prima Games, showcases the design sketches and concept art which was created for the original Mass Effect game.
- The Art of the Mass Effect Universe (2012), published by Dark Horse Comics, includes art, sketches and paintings for the entire trilogy, including several pieces originally published in the first book.
- The Art of Mass Effect: Andromeda (2017), published by Dark Horse Comics, contains art, sketches and paintings that were created for Mass Effect: Andromeda.
- The Art of the Mass Effect Trilogy: Expanded Edition (2021), a reedition of The Art of the Mass Effect Universe published by Dark Horse Comics, includes all of the content the previous edition included and over 90 additional pages of artwork focused on the trilogy's downloadable content and Mass Effect 3's multiplayer.

=== Comics ===
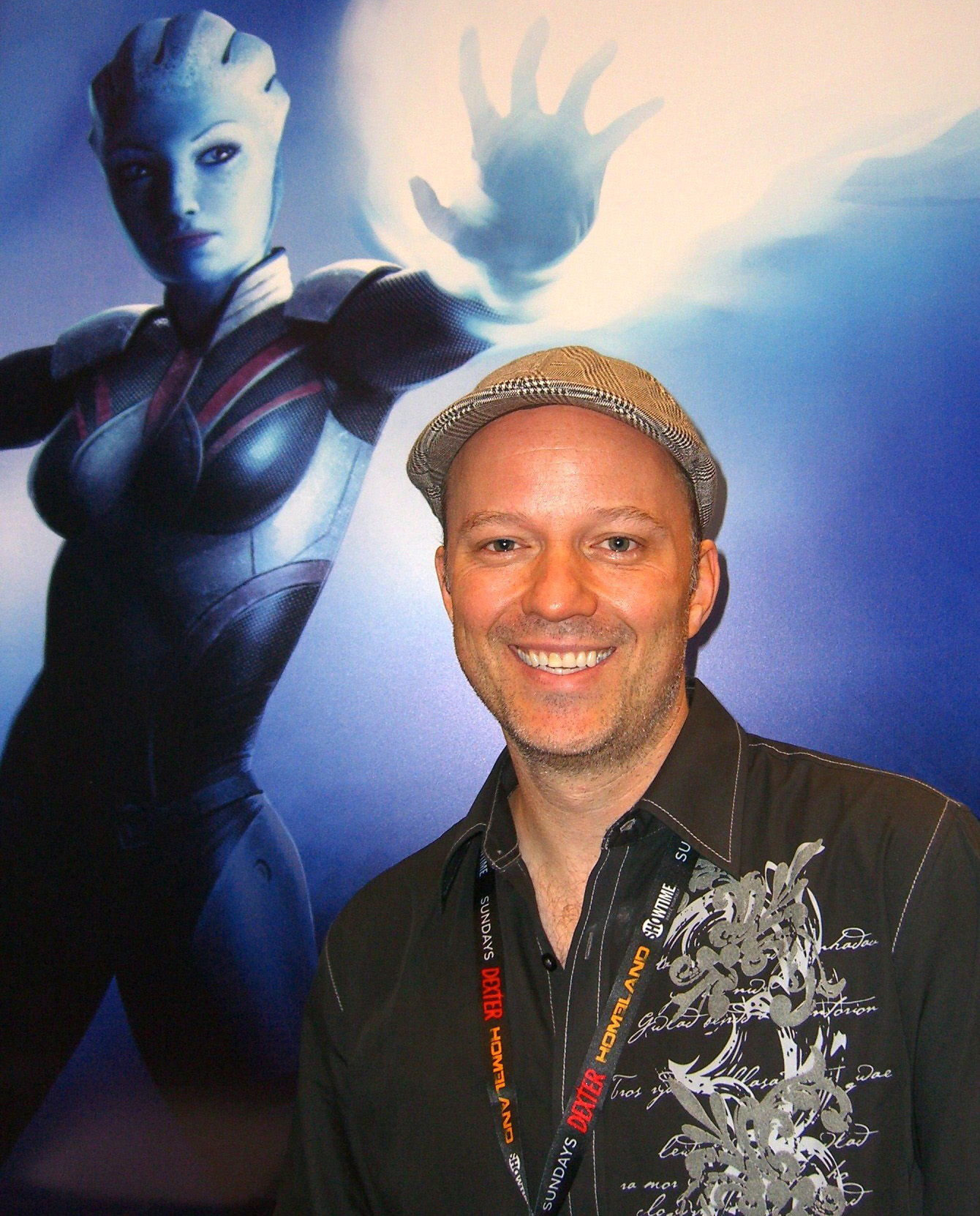
Writer Mac Walters in front of a Mass Effect poster at the Dark Horse Comics booth at the 2011 New York Comic Con

All published by Dark Horse Comics:

- Mass Effect: Redemption is a four-part comic book mini-series that was released between January and April 2010. The story, which revolves around Liara T'Soni, is set in the interim period between the prologue and main storyline of Mass Effect 2, and is related to the downloadable content "Lair of the Shadow Broker" that was released for the game.
- Mass Effect: Incursion is an on-line comic (8 pages) that follows Aria T'Loak's encounter with the Collectors one week prior to the opening events of Mass Effect 2. The events of Incursion link into the events of the comic miniseries Mass Effect: Redemption. It was released June 21, 2010 through IGN.
- Mass Effect: Inquisition is an on-line comic (8 pages) written by Mac Walters. Taking place after Mass Effect 2, the plot follows Captain Armando-Owen Bailey during his investigation of Executor Venari Pallin and corruption within C-Sec. It was released October 26, 2010 through USA Today.
- Mass Effect: Evolution is a four-part comic book mini-series. The first issue was released in January 2011. The story focuses on the origin of the Illusive Man and is set during the First Contact War, shortly after the discovery of the Mass Relays.
- Mass Effect: Conviction is a free short (10 page) single issue mini-comic written by Mac Walters. Taking place before Mass Effect 3, the plot follows Lieutenant James Vega during his stay on Omega before returning to Systems Alliance service. Released in September 2011 available through a digital distribution promotion exclusively at participating retailers.
- Mass Effect: Invasion is a comic book series (4 issues) released between October 2011 and January 2012. It follows Aria T'Loak, the pirate queen of the space station Omega, as her station comes under attack from a new threat unleashed by Cerberus, the human survivalist organization.
- Mass Effect: Homeworlds is a comic book series (4 issues) written by game lead writer Mac Walters released April 25, 2012. Each issue focuses on a main character from the Mass Effect series.
- Mass Effect: Blasto: Eternity Is Forever is a 14-page single-issue written by Mac Walters released on November 7, 2012, through digital distribution. The main character is Blasto, the protagonist of several in-universe films, depicted as the galaxy's first Hanar Spectre.
- Mass Effect: He Who Laughs Best is a short (10 page) single issue mini-comic written by Mac Walters released on May 4, 2013 for Free Comic Book Day 2013. It explains how Jeff "Joker" Moreau became the SSV Normandy's pilot prior to the events of Mass Effect.
- Mass Effect: Foundation is a 13-issue comic series written by Mac Walters. The first issue was released on July 24, 2013. It features a story that runs parallel to the game trilogy and is designed to expand the universe as a whole.
- Mass Effect: Discovery is a comic book series (4 issues) written by Jeremy Barlow released in 2017. Each issue focuses on the Andromeda Initiative from the Mass Effect series.

=== Films ===
- Mass Effect: Paragon Lost (2012): On April 7, 2011, EA announced that anime distributor Funimation Entertainment and Japanese studio T.O Entertainment will produce an anime film adaptation based on the series. The film was released on December 28, 2012. It serves as the prequel to Mass Effect 3 and follows the early career of Alliance Marine James Vega as he leads an elite Special Forces squad into battle against The Collectors during the events of Mass Effect 2. Stationed at a colony in a remote star-system, Vega and his soldiers must protect the civilians from a ruthless invasion by the Collectors, determined to capture the population for unknown purposes.
- Mass Effect: EA announced in May 2010 that Legendary Pictures and Warner Bros. acquired the rights to a Mass Effect film, with the game's executive producer Casey Hudson, as well as Ray Muzyka and Greg Zeschuck from BioWare, to serve as executive producers. Initially, Legendary planned to produce the film with Thomas Tull, Jon Jashni, and Avi Arad, with a screenplay by Mark Protosevich. Protosevich and the producers had stated that the film would have followed the plot of the original game. By October 2012, Morgan Davis Foehl had become the screenwriter, according to Variety. In a 2021 interview, BioWare's Mac Walters stated that the film project never progressed further beyond the initial planning stages after it was announced due to two primary issues. First, they were unsure of what they could focus on from the game in a 90 to 120-minute film while keeping the essence of the game. Second, a change in leadership at Legendary's directed focus away from film projects towards television, and the project had been rescoped for a possible television series but never got off the ground.

=== Television series ===
On November 23, 2021, Deadline Hollywood reported that negotiations were underway to adapt the Mass Effect franchise for Amazon Prime Video. In November 2024, Amazon officially announced the series was in development with Karim Zreik producing under his Cedar Tree Productions banner alongside Ari Arad and Michael Gamble of Electronic Arts. Daniel Casey is slated to write and produce the work. On June 6, 2025, Doug Jung was hired to serve as showrunner for the series. In November 2025, it was revealed that the show would explore a new story set within the Mass Effect timeline, taking place after the original trilogy.

=== Action figures ===
Two series of action figures were released by DC Direct and Big Fish Toys for Mass Effect 2 and Mass Effect 3. Series one included action figures of Commander Shepard, Grunt, Tali, and Thane. Series two included Garrus, Legion, Miranda, and Mordin. Each figure features game-accurate accessories and can be found in game and hobby shops and various online retailers. The figures tied to Mass Effect 3 include bonus downloadable content, which is exclusive and different for each character.

=== Other ===
- Mass Effect: New Earth (2016): A 4D holographic experience introduced at California's Great America amusement park in 2016.
- Risk: Mass Effect Galaxy at War Edition (2013) was announced by USAopoly and was released in Fall 2013.
- Monopoly: Mass Effect (2015)
- Mass Effect: Priority Hagalaz (2024) The board game was developed by Eric Lang and Calvin Wong Tze Loon, who chose the Hagalaz setting as a planet that was not fully explored in the video games. The game features scenarios where the players investigated a crashed Cerberus cruiser, confronting further enemies on the way.

== Development and history ==
Mass Effect began as a 2003 pitch for a project codenamed SFX by BioWare project director Casey Hudson to the company's co-founders, Ray Muzyka and Greg Zeschuk. Hudson wanted the company to set a goal on developing its own science fiction intellectual property that is on the same scale and scope as the Star Wars setting. On 11 October 2007, shortly before the release of the original Mass Effect video game for the Xbox 360 in November 2007, it was announced that EA bought out VG Holding Corp., a partnership between BioWare and Pandemic Studios formed in November 2005. The Mass Effect IP was acquired by EA in the process and BioWare continued their role as the IP's developers.

The technological outline of the series is based on the theory of dark energy, a form of energy proposed to be the source of the universe's expansion, and a hypothetical instrument for faster-than-light (FTL) travel. By applying a strong electric current via dark energy to the fictional Element Zero or "eezo", "mass effect" fields could be created and manipulated: a positive current raises the mass of any object currently occupying that spot and help to create artificial gravity effects, while a negative current does the inverse by reducing mass and improves the cost-effective expenditure of fuel for starships that move at FTL speeds. The stronger the current, the greater the magnitude of the dark energy mass effect. Other real world advanced scientific concepts explored in the series include 3D printing for the omni-tool concept, hard light technology, and hypervelocity weaponry. Based on the "underlying idea that real-life scientific discoveries consistently create imagery and concepts that blow away previous notions of what is possible," Hudson opined that "reality will continue to be stranger than fiction" which in his view justifies the developers' creative license with their work.

Morality is measured by "Paragon" and "Renegade" points for the first three main series games, which has been described as a more nuanced continuation of the morality system surrounding the light and dark side of the Force BioWare developed for their previous work, the 2003 video game Star Wars: Knights of the Old Republic. A spin-off for the Nintendo DS titled Mass Effect: Corsair, patterned after the gameplay of Star Control and centered around a Han Solo-inspired space pirate character played from a first-person perspective was briefly explored in 2008. The project was to be developed in tandem with the original video game trilogy, although the developers ultimately abandoned the project due to the prohibitive cost of Nintendo DS cartridges as well as the publisher's unoptimistic estimation of the projected sales data for the project, with the team and its resources reassigned to work on Mass Effect 2. Former BioWare employee Dorian Kieken noted that the central concept of Corsair as a narrative adventure which follows a morally ambiguous protagonist would have been an ideal vehicle to explore as an expansion of the Mass Effect universe. For 2017's Mass Effect: Andromeda, the binary Paragon and Renegade morality system was removed entirely.

In 2007 BioWare filed a patent for the Dialogue Wheel, described in official documents as a "graphical interface for interactive dialog," which was officially granted to its parent company EA International Studio and Publishing Ltd by the United States Patent & Trademark Office in 2011.

=== Cultural influences ===
Besides Star Wars, the Mass Effect universe is also inspired by several established conventions and tropes found in other science fiction franchises, such as Star Trek, Blade Runner, Firefly, and Battlestar Galactica. Other intellectual properties which influenced the series' atmosphere and artistic qualities included Alien, Starship Troopers, Dune and Final Fantasy: The Spirits Within. Several video games fed into Hudson's vision for the gameplay experience of the series: these include Deus Ex's choice-based branching storylines, the gunplay mechanics of the Halo franchise, and the open-ended galaxy exploration of the MS-DOS game Starflight.

Aspects of Greek mythology have been consistently invoked throughout the series, from the names of in-universe objects and organizations like the planet Elysium or the anthropocentric paramilitary group Cerberus, to the narrative themes of certain story arcs like the Prothean's connection to the contemporary civilizations of the galaxy through the technology they left behind.

=== Music ===
The music of the series is noted for its similarity in style to the vintage synthesizer score for Blade Runner, which creates a mood appropriate for the oscillating wonder and terror of unknown space. According to Jack Wall, who served as the composer for the first two Mass Effect games, he combined the electronic instrument palette from the late 1970s to early 1980s with organic elements to create the first game's soundscape. Subsequent games have adopted a more cinematic, orchestral style with the involvement of composers like Clint Mansell and Sam Hulick, while retaining certain elements of Wall's earlier work for the franchise.

== Reception ==
Aggregate review scores
Game	Metacritic
Mass Effect	(PC) 89/100 (PS3) 85/100 (X360) 91/100
Mass Effect 2	(PC) 94/100 (PS3) 94/100 (X360) 96/100
Mass Effect 3	(PC) 89/100 (PS3) 93/100 (WIIU) 85/100 (X360) 93/100
Mass Effect: Andromeda	(PC) 72/100 (PS4) 71/100 (XONE) 76/100

=== Critical response ===
The original Mass Effect trilogy has received near-universal critical acclaim across all release platforms, according to review aggregator Metacritic. All three games have received numerous nominations as well as number of year-end awards from video game publications and major award ceremonies, and are widely considered to be among the greatest games of all time. Mass Effect 2 in particular is the most critically acclaimed game in the series and garnered numerous game of the year awards following its release. It received over 70 perfect review scores. In 2013 IGN rated the Mass Effect Trilogy the best Xbox 360 game(s) out of a list of 25, and the 7th best PS3 game(s) out of a list of 25.

The fourth installment, Mass Effect: Andromeda, received a less enthusiastic critical reception, with a consensus among critics that it was not up to par with its predecessors in terms of overall quality, although the improved combat received praise.

=== Sales ===
The Mass Effect franchise has been successful commercially. The first game in the franchise sold over one million units worldwide in less than three weeks after launch. Sales rose to 1.6 million copies after six weeks of availability by January 2008. Its sequel, Mass Effect 2 shipped more than two million copies to retailers within the game's first week. The game sold over 500,000 copies in the month of release, despite being released at the end of the month. Before the release of the third game, the series sold a combined total of 7 million copies worldwide. Mass Effect 3 was the most commercially successful game of the series: it sold over 800,000 copies in its first 24 hours, and its opening month sales were twice that of its predecessor's, selling over 900,000 copies on the Xbox 360 version, outselling the PlayStation 3 version 4 to 1 and bringing in over $200 million in revenue. By April 2012 it sold over twice as many copies as Mass Effect 2 in their respective launch months and generated lifetime sales of over six million copies. The Mass Effect series had sold a total of 14 million units by July 5, 2014.

Mass Effect: Andromeda continued the sales success of its predecessors. By May 2017, an analyst noted that at least 2.5 million retail copies of Mass Effect: Andromeda had been shipped for $110 million in revenue. Additionally, $53 million in net sales from digital and special editions for Andromeda were generated in March 2017 but deferred to a later date.

== Legacy and cultural impact ==
Tauriq Moosa from The Guardian lauded the Mass Effect franchise as some of the best science fiction ever made, describing its overarching theme of "aspiration and connection in the face of an indifferent cosmos" to be "as cerebral as Star Trek, as hopeful as Asimov and as dramatic as Battlestar Galactica". Jessi Sampson from PCGamesN concurred and called Mass Effect an "impressive melting pot of ideas" from various seminal science fiction works, and that the ambition of the first game and its developers shaped the video game industry and "left behind a legacy as bright as the stars it had so vividly imagined". Writing for Wired, Jonathan Wood said the first Mass Effect set a high bar for storytelling in the video game medium unmatched by most of its contemporaries. Benjamin Bullard from Syfy noted that the first game debuted at a time when science fiction video games mainly revolved around persistent conflict and violence between alien and human characters, and the franchise had since grown from a niche RPG into a "full-scale AAA gaming phenomenon."

In 2010, GamesRadar called Mass Effect the best new franchise of the (then seventh) generation, with a galaxy setting "so well-constructed that it felt like a decades-old franchise and represented a high-water mark for video games as a story-telling medium." Colin Moriarty stated that "the Mass Effect series is one of the defining video game franchises of [the seventh] generation". Kyle Munkittrick from Gizmodo argued that Mass Effect, based on several factors articulated in his article, is the most important science fiction universe of the contemporary generation. Patrick Carlson from PC Gamer called Mass Effect one of the grandest and most personal science fiction epics across all mediums due to the successful combination of classic space opera's best elements with an RPG adventure structure that "encourages both playful and serious challenges to traditional science fiction". Cian Maher from TheGamer credited the series' well-written codex entries as playing an instrumental role in building "one of the most fascinating universes in the history of video games".

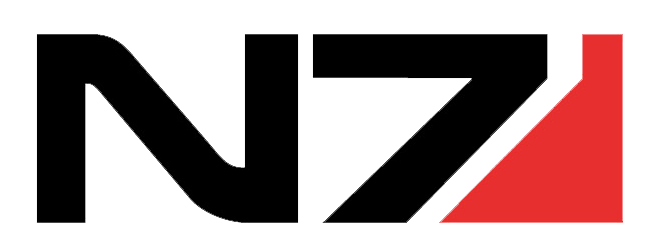
The N7 emblem

N7 Day is an informal commemorative day observed annually on November 7 by BioWare, Electronic Arts and Mass Effect fandom. It originated as a marketing initiative by BioWare in 2012 to celebrate the Mass Effect media franchise. "N7" refers to Commander Shepard's in-universe military designation code worn on the character's armor: "N" is the classification for special forces and "7" is for Shepard's highly prestigious in-universe rank.

=== Unofficial ===
The Mass Effect franchise has inspired a number of noteworthy fan labor-driven works:

- Mass Effect: Assignment (2012) is a fan film set in the same timeline as the Mass Effect game series, but following a group of original characters. The film follows the story of two N7 Soldiers, Meer and Hale, who are hunting down Defoe, a smuggler whose cargo is of great interest to a lot of parties. The film was produced by filmmaking duo Sneaky Zebra and marks the first fan film set in the Mass Effect universe. The film features the unique element of being interactive much like the games series allowing the viewer to choose the path of the plot to four possible endings. Three character-based teaser trailers were released in December via Machinima with the full short being released in February 2012.
- Red Sand (2012) is a fan film that serves as a prequel to the Mass Effect series. It is set 35 years before the plot of the games and tells the story of the discovery of the ancient Prothean ruins of Mars. The film stars Mark Meer, voice of the male version of Commander Shepard in the games, as Colonel Jon Grissom. It was produced by the students and faculty of the Digital Video Program at the University of Advancing Technology in Tempe, Arizona.
- Mass Effect: Pick Your Path (2012) is an interactive fiction novel written by Mike Kayatta that runs parallel to the events of Mass Effect 2. It follows the exploits of an unnamed Citadel merchant who chases Commander Shepard around the galaxy to gain an endorsement for his shop. Encouraged by The Illusive Man for unknown reasons, the merchant becomes haplessly entangled with the dangerous aftermath of Shepard's various adventures. The story, considered similar to the Choose Your Own Adventure series of books, features the same choice-driven format of the games, allowing the reader to choose between "paragon" or "renegade" actions, drastically affect the ending, and even romance a selection of unique party members. The full story was published by The Escapist in March 2012.

=== Controversies ===
The Mass Effect series has been the subject of several major video game controversies. A cutscene from the first Mass Effect, which contains depictions of partial nudity and sexual activity, was accused by conservative media outlets of being obscene content in late 2007. Controversy over the cutscene, especially one version which depicts a potential intimate scene between Liara T'Soni and a female Commander Shepard, attracted at least one instance of government scrutiny, which led to the game being briefly banned in Singapore. The controversy prompted an intervention from BioWare management into the development of Mass Effect 2 to remove planned same sex romantic content for companion characters like Jacob Taylor and Jack.

Although Mass Effect 3 garnered critical acclaim like its predecessors, controversy surrounded its release. The most notable incident involved the public's reaction and refusal to accept the game's (and the trilogy's) ending. Several players organized themselves around internet campaigns to demand a better ending to the game. Both the US Federal Trade Commission and the British Advertising Standards Authority (ASA) received complaints alleging that BioWare misled consumers under existing law which governs product advertising and consumer rights. BioWare later released an "extended cut" patch which would expand upon, but not replace, the endings of Mass Effect 3. BioWare also faced accusations of unethical business practices over its handling of the release for the Mass Effect 3: From Ashes DLC pack, as well as potential conflict of interest over video game media personality Jessica Chobot's involvement in Mass Effect 3.

Other noteworthy controversies surrounding the series include public outrage over the alleged link between the series' in-game combat violence to the perpetrator of the Sandy Hook Elementary School shooting, which was later debunked; the appropriation of assets from Mass Effect 2 into a propaganda video to support the 2016 presidential campaign of Donald Trump, which was promoted by Trump's social media accounts shortly before it was taken down over claims of copyright infringement by publisher EA; and reactions to the portrayal and representation of women as well as sexual minorities.
