= Mass Effect: Pinnacle Station =

- Developer: Demiurge Studios
- Publisher: Microsoft Game Studios (Note: Electronic Arts took over the publishing rights in 2011.)
- Series: Mass Effect
- Engine: Unreal Engine 3
- Platforms: Xbox 360; Microsoft Windows
- Release: August 25, 2009
- Genres: Action role-playing, third-person shooter
- Mode: Single-player

Mass Effect: Pinnacle Station is a downloadable content (DLC) expansion pack developed by Demiurge Studios on behalf of Mass Effect franchise creator BioWare and published by Microsoft Game Studios for the 2007 action role-playing video game Mass Effect. Pinnacle Station was released for the Xbox 360 and Microsoft Windows on August 25, 2009. The pack follows a squad led by Commander Shepard as they undergo special operations training on Pinnacle Station, a concealed military training facility.

Pinnacle Station is the second and final downloadable content pack for Mass Effect. It received a generally negative reception from video game publications, with a predominant view among reviewers that the pack was uninspiring, unnecessary and represents poor value for money.

== Gameplay ==
The player as Shepard arrives at Pinnacle Station, with an open panoramic view of astronomical objects beyond the station's exterior.

Mass Effect: Pinnacle Station is a downloadable content (DLC) pack for the 2007 action role-playing video game Mass Effect. The pack takes place in 2183 on Pinnacle Station, a former military command center built into a giant asteroid which have been repurposed into a training facility for high-level special operations teams employed by the Citadel Council. The player assumes the role of Commander Shepard, an elite human soldier who commands the SSV Normandy SR-1 starship and a recently appointed member of the Spectres, an organization of special forces personnel who answer directly to the council.

The pack's content is accessible once the base game's narrative progresses to a predetermined point where Shepard attains Spectre status. It introduces a training facility where Shepard can compete in eight virtual reality combat scenarios, simulated by holographic projectors which create visual representations of opponents and obstacles, and are divided into four different game modes. Survival is a battle mode in which the player's squad fend off attackers for as long as possible; in Time Trial, the squad needs to take down a set number of enemies as quickly as possible; for Hunt mode, a timer counts down to zero and the player needs to add time to their clock by defeating up to a certain number of enemies; in Capture mode, the player runs to a predesignated point and holds their position for a short while until the capture is complete. After beating the combat scenarios, the player would need to complete four more to unlock a special Survival mode, which is the same as the previous Survival challenges but the time limit is set at five minutes. The premise of the pack is that Shepard will be rewarded with an apartment and "a steady influx of rare items" by successfully advancing through the challenge scenarios and emerging as the top competitor on Pinnacle Station's virtual leaderboards.

== Development and release ==
Pinnacle Station was developed by American video game developer Demiurge Studios, with support from BioWare as their client. In a documentary bundled with the Platinum Hits edition of the first Mass Effect game, Mass Effect lead designer Preston Watamaniuk described Pinnacle Station as "a Fight Club-style arena" and originally intended to include a similar arena in the base game, but the idea was ultimately dropped because the team did not have the time and they did not think they were able to do it well enough. Project director Casey Hudson said they wanted to offer players "a much more combat-oriented, lighter-story experience," and suggested that the players could expect "a kind of casino gaming fight club space station".

On August 25, 2009 Pinnacle Station was released, without any formal announcement or advertising prior, as a paid download for the Xbox 360 and as a free download for Microsoft Windows. Shortly after the release of Pinnacle Station, reports emerged which revealed that some players experienced a glitch which was preventing the DLC pack from being registered by the game after it has been downloaded. It was later discovered that this occurred because of a compatibility issue between the disc-based version of the previous DLC, Mass Effect: Bring Down the Sky which was included with Xbox 360 Classics or Platinum Hits version of Mass Effect, and Pinnacle Station. Jack Lamden, BioWare QA staff member, responded to concerns and provided assurance that his company were attempting to resolve the issue as quickly as they could.

Pinnacle Station is unavailable on the PlayStation 3 version of the game. For the Mass Effect Trilogy compilation released on December 4, 2012, Pinnacle Station is available for free as per the standalone product of the PC version of the original Mass Effect. Due to a loss of its source code, Pinnacle Station is not remastered for inclusion in Mass Effect: Legendary Edition. In November 2021, modders restored Pinnacle Station for its unofficial inclusion on the PC version of Legendary Edition.

== Reception ==
Reception

Aggregate score
Aggregator	Score
Metacritic	48/100 (X360)

Review scores
Publication	Score
GameSpot	4/10
IGN	5/10
Jeuxvideo.com	4/10
AtomicGamer	8/10

The Xbox 360 version of Pinnacle Station received mostly negative reviews from critics. Erik Brudvig from IGN criticized the pack as "poorly constructed". He noted that Pinnacle Station contains almost no story elements, and argued all thirteen of its combat scenarios were bland, the arenas "look recycled", and the graphics a "perfect showcase" of the base game's technical issues. Brudvig said it offers nothing of what made Mass Effect an appealing game, and suggested that players skip the pack altogether as it may even adversely affect their anticipation for Mass Effect 2. Kevin VanOrd from GameSpot praised the salarian character Tech Officer Ochren, but criticized nearly every aspect of Pinnacle Station; he called the pack "a creative nadir in an otherwise excellent sci-fi universe", and an insult to fans who clamor for new content due to what he perceived to be poor value for money. Jeuxvideo.com offered a broad criticism of the pack's content, save for the soundtrack though the pack does not offer any new compositions, and insinuated that it was telling of the pack's perceived dubious quality that Pinnacle Station was released without much fanfare or publicity.

Not all reception of the pack was negative. Jeff Buckland from AtomicGamer gave a positive review and considered the pack to offer decent value when compared to pricing for comparable DLC packs from other video game titles at the time. Buckland said he would recommend Pinnacle Station to players who have completed the game at least once and who just want to "eke out a bit more fun". Stephen Totilo from Kotaku had "more negative things to say than positive" with regards to the content offered by Pinnacle Station, which he described as "experimental" and its combat scenarios akin to the Kobayashi Maru training exercise from Star Trek. Nevertheless, Totilo concluded that he liked Pinnacle Station in spite of its flaws and suggested that it offered a glimpse into the multiplayer potential of the Mass Effect franchise.

In a retrospective discussion about the DLC pack, Chris Thursten from PC Gamer suggested that Pinnacle Station is a notable example of DLC which is not entirely filler but is certainly missable. He noted that gameplay for DLC's like Pinnacle Station consists of nothing more than "new healthbars to whittle and new gear to find with companions whose voices are notably absent", and follows plotlines that add nothing consequential to the overall narrative. Liana Ruppert from Game Informer was of the opinion that Pinnacle Station was enjoyable, and it allowed players to "hone combat skills in an exciting way".
