= Mass Effect 2: Kasumi – Stolen Memory =

2010 downloadable content

- Developer: BioWare
- Publishers: Electronic Arts; Microsoft Game Studios (X360)
- Composers: Cris Velasco; Sascha Dikiciyan
- Series: Mass Effect
- Engine: Unreal Engine 3
- Platforms: Microsoft Windows; Xbox 360; PlayStation 3
- Release: Windows, Xbox 360; April 6, 2010; PlayStation 3 January 18, 2011
- Genres: Action role-playing, third-person shooter
- Mode: Single-player

Mass Effect 2: Kasumi – Stolen Memory is a downloadable content pack developed by BioWare and published by Electronic Arts and Microsoft Game Studios for the 2010 action role-playing video game Mass Effect 2. It was released for Microsoft Windows and Xbox 360 on April 6, 2010. It was also included in the PlayStation 3 version of Mass Effect 2, which was released in 2011 by Electronic Arts. Set within the Milky Way galaxy during the 22nd century, Stolen Memory follows thief Kasumi Goto and her efforts to steal a graybox that contains memories of her partner.

Stolen Memory was announced at the 2010 Game Developers Conference and is the first major downloadable content pack for Mass Effect 2 that does not require the game's Cerberus Network, an online downloadable content and news service that enables free bonus content for the game. Its soundtrack was composed by Sonic Mayhem duo Sascha Dikiciyan and Cris Velasco. The pack received mixed reviews from critics, who criticized its short length but nevertheless highlighted its enjoyable gameplay. In 2021, Stolen Memory was remastered as part of the Mass Effect Legendary Edition.

== Gameplay ==
Kasumi Goto (on the right) is controlled by the game's artificial intelligence.

Mass Effect 2: Kasumi – Stolen Memory is a downloadable content pack for the 2010 action role-playing video game Mass Effect 2. Set within the Milky Way galaxy during the 22nd century, it follows thief Kasumi Goto and her efforts to steal a graybox that contains memories of her partner Keiji Okuda, who was killed by a weapons dealer after he acquired sensitive information. The player assumes the role of Commander Shepard, an elite human soldier who recruits and helps Goto in her quest. Ultimately, the pair accesses the graybox and sees a hologram of Okuda, who reveals the data and says that it would impact humanity's reputation if made public. He then begs Goto to destroy the data along with his memories. Shepard can persuade her to follow Keiji's wishes or keep the data.

Stolen Memory is split into two acts that take place in a rich mansion. The first act involves the player interacting with the environment and non-player characters to find a way to get access to the graybox. In contrast, the second act is more action-oriented and involves the player fighting a large number of enemies, culminating with a boss fight at the end. During the second act, the player is assisted by Goto, who is controlled by the game's artificial intelligence. She has the ability to cloak and deliver a sneak attack. After completing Stolen Memory, Goto gains the Flashbang Grenade ability, which can be used to incapacitate targets. As a squad member, Goto and her abilities can be used in the main game. Stolen Memory also includes a new weapon, an in-game upgrade that the player can research to enhance abilities, and an achievement.

== Development and release ==
Stolen Memory was developed by BioWare and published by Electronic Arts and Microsoft Game Studios. During development of Mass Effect 2, Bioware stated that downloadable content was becoming a fundamental part of the company's overall philosophy. The pack was announced at the Game Developers Conference on March 11, 2010. BioWare remarked that Stolen Memory would have a feel similar to a James Bond mission. The mansion where the events of Stolen Memory take place was originally suggested to take place on a colony of the in-game alien race Asari, before a human planet was chosen. It was conceived as "a house in the Hollywood Hills, but with more advanced, Mass Effect-era architecture." The outfit of Goto was designed to reflect that of a medieval thief. The soundtrack was composed by Sonic Mayhem duo Sascha Dikiciyan and Cris Velasco.

Stolen Memory was released on April 6, 2010, for Microsoft Windows and Xbox 360. It is the first major downloadable content pack for Mass Effect 2 that does not require the game's Cerberus Network, an online downloadable content and news service that enables free bonus content for the main game. At the release day, the pack was unavailable for download for a brief period of time due to Xbox Live server issues. Like Mass Effect 2's other downloadable content packs Overlord and Lair of the Shadow Broker, Stolen Memory is freely included in the PlayStation 3 version of the game, which was released on January 18, 2011. In 2021, the pack was remastered as part of the Mass Effect Legendary Edition.

== Reception ==
Reception

Aggregate score
Aggregator	Score
Metacritic	71/100 (PC); 71/100 (X360)

Review scores
Publication	Score
Eurogamer	8/10
GameRevolution	C+
GameSpot	6.5/10
IGN	7.5/10
GameCritics.com	7.5/10

Stolen Memory received generally mixed reviews, with most critics criticizing its short length. IGN reviewer Erik Brudvig opined that Stolen Memory "is a great little quest, but for most the 'little' part will be a sticking point. At roughly an hour in length, this is one download that doesn't offer a lot of bang for your buck." Writing for GameSpot, Kevin VanOrd felt that Goto is not interesting and that her mission is too short for her character development compared to the squad members of the base game. Similarly, GameCritics reviewer Brad Gallaway criticized the fact that the player cannot directly interact with her once Stolen Memory has been completed.

In a more positive review, Dan Whitehead of Eurogamer stated that Stolen Memory "does a good job of justifying itself through enjoyable gameplay and clever storytelling. Short, yes, but also surprisingly sweet." He also highlighted positively the story and opined that the ending adds a darker tone to Goto's "flirtatious character", stating that "the obligatory moral choice at the end is dictated by intimate emotional considerations rather than battlefield pragmatism." Eduardo Reboucas of GameRevolution criticized the fact that the story does not fit in a post-story scenario, stating that Stolen Memory "is intended to be played as you're making your way through the storyline of the main game and not in the aftermath."

GameCritics praised the first act, comparing it favorably to the 2001 film Ocean's Eleven and stating that it was "an unusual and welcome change of pace." VanOrd credited the fact that the player can gain access to the graybox in two different ways, but felt that breaking into its vault was "paced slowly without offering any sense of increasing tension or extended dialogue options to compensate." Nevertheless, he praised Goto's ability to silently backstab enemies and the combat scenarios for their enemy variety. The final boss battle was said to be predictable but enjoyable and satisfying. VanOrd concluded that Stolen Memory "is still worth a look, but it won't leave you with any lasting memories of your own."
