= Mass Effect 2: Lair of the Shadow Broker =

2010 downloadable content

- Developer: BioWare
- Publishers: Electronic Arts; Microsoft Game Studios (X360)
- Director: Casey Hudson
- Composer: Christopher Lennertz
- Series: Mass Effect
- Engine: Unreal Engine 3
- Platforms: Windows; Xbox 360; PlayStation 3
- Release: Windows, Xbox 360; September 7, 2010; PlayStation 3 January 18, 2011
- Genres: Action role-playing, third-person shooter
- Mode: Single-player

Mass Effect 2: Lair of the Shadow Broker is a downloadable content pack developed by BioWare and published by Electronic Arts and Microsoft Game Studios for the 2010 action role-playing video game Mass Effect 2. It was released for Microsoft Windows and Xbox 360 on September 7, 2010. It was also included in the PlayStation 3 version of Mass Effect 2, which was released in 2011 by Electronic Arts. Set after the events of the Mass Effect: Redemption comic book, Lair of the Shadow Broker follows the story of information broker Liara T'Soni and her efforts to find an information dealer known as the Shadow Broker.

Lair of the Shadow Broker is a major downloadable content pack for Mass Effect 2 and some decisions the player makes can affect the story of Mass Effect 3. It received very positive reviews from critics, who considered it as a valuable addition to the base game in both story and content. At the 2010 Spike Video Game Awards, Lair of the Shadow Broker was nominated for Best DLC (downloadable content). In 2021, the pack was remastered as part of the Mass Effect Legendary Edition.

== Premise ==
At one point in the game, the player must control a vehicle through the skies of a city.

Set after the events of the Mass Effect: Redemption comic book, it follows information broker Liara T'Soni and her efforts to find an information dealer known as the Shadow Broker. The player assumes the role of Commander Shepard, an elite human soldier who decides to help T'Soni in her quest. Ultimately, the Shadow Broker is located and discovered to be an advanced member of a pre-spaceflight species. He is fought and killed, with T'Soni assuming the identity of the Shadow Broker and continuing his operations. She also mentions that she will be able to provide Shepard with more information thanks to the Broker's extensive networks.

== Gameplay ==
Lair of the Shadow Broker is split into two acts, each ending with a boss fight. The first act takes place in a commerce planet named Illium, also featured in the main game, while the second one takes place aboard the Shadow Broker's spaceship. Although most of the gameplay involves squad-based combat and interacting with non-player characters, the first act features a chase scene where the player must control a high-speed vehicle through the skies of Illium for a brief period. At one point in the game, T'Soni joins Shepard's squad, offering a different set of combat abilities and powers than the base game's squad members. The relationship between Shepard and T'Soni can vary depending on whether they were romantically involved in the original Mass Effect.

After completing Lair of the Shadow Broker, the Shadow Broker's spaceship is available for the player to explore. Inside the ship, the player may use several terminals with different functions. Some terminals show surveillance footage, dossiers on Shepard's squad members, and a video archive which contains clips taken from around the Milky Way galaxy, where the main game takes place. Additionally, the player may purchase mining manifests which are useful to mark mineral-rich planets on the game's galaxy map, and invest credits in various mini-missions which allow the player to receive upgrades and resources from the Shadow Broker's contacts. Lair of the Shadow Broker also includes several in-game upgrades, which allow the player to enhance certain aspects of the game's weapons and armor, as well as five achievements.

== Development and release ==
Lair of the Shadow Broker was developed by BioWare and published by Electronic Arts and Microsoft Game Studios. During development of Mass Effect 2, Bioware stated that downloadable content was becoming a fundamental part of the company's overall philosophy. The pack was announced to be in development on July 22, 2010, with the release of three brand-new screenshots of the game. BioWare stated that the decisions players make in Lair of the Shadow Broker would affect certain storylines in the then-upcoming Mass Effect 2 sequel Mass Effect 3. Animating the Shadow Broker's face involved some technical difficulties. According to BioWare, the game's default digital-acting system "could not handle the stresses of the new face, so custom work had to be done to animate his multiple eyes and triangular mouth." The soundtrack was composed by Christopher Lennertz, who previously penned the music for the Overlord downloadable content pack.

Lair of the Shadow Broker was released on September 7, 2010, for Microsoft Windows and Xbox 360. Like Mass Effect 2's earlier downloadable content packs Kasumi – Stolen Memory and Overlord, the pack is freely included in the PlayStation 3 version of the game, which was released on January 18, 2011. In 2021, Lair of the Shadow Broker was remastered as part of the Mass Effect Legendary Edition.

== Reception ==
Reception

Aggregate score
Aggregator	Score
Metacritic	86/100 (PC); 87/100 (X360)

Review scores
Publication	Score
Destructoid	9.5/10
Eurogamer	9/10
GameRevolution	A−
GameSpot	8.5/10
IGN	9.5/10
GameCritics.com	8.5/10

Lair of the Shadow Broker received very positive reviews from critics, who considered it to be the greatest downloadable content pack of the game. Dan Whitehead of Eurogamer considered Lair of the Shadow Broker "a solid, thrilling, satisfying addition to an already expansive universe; one that leaves you on an appropriate note of hopeful melancholy." He praised the amount of content in the pack, stating that it "adds far more to the game than some of its disappointingly slender predecessors." GameRevolution's Eduardo Reboucas said that the pack is "a blast, especially for fans who want to catch up with Liara and dissect the bits of story that were omitted in the main game."

The narrative and story were highlighted positively. Critics praised the fact that some decisions from the original Mass Effect impact the storytelling experience. IGN stated that the storytelling "effectively communicates the strong bond between [Shepard and T'Soni], even if they weren't romantically involved in your game." The graphics received similar praise. Brad Gallaway, a reviewer for GameCritics, noted that they "make the action feel like a more organic part of the story and engage the player in some superb atmosphere." The exterior of the Shadow Broker's ship was seen by some critics as the pack's most impressive battle environment. IGN remarked that "approaching the Shadow Broker's ship is simply stunning as lightning storms envelope [sic] the massive vessel."

Destructoid highlighted the pacing and combat intensity, stating they require the player to pay more attention to the gameplay flow. Kevin VanOrd of GameSpot stated similar pros, especially during the second act. According to him, "enemies attack at just the right pace, so individual battles never drag on too long, nor are they over so quickly that they end up being unsatisfying." He also highlighted the vehicle chase scene, comparing it favorably to Blade Runner and The Fifth Element, but criticize the controls in the Xbox 360 version for not being very precise. The boss battles received similar praise, with IGN stating that both of them "have unique traits that make them a formidable opponent." The Shadow Broker's base was highlighted as a valuable addition to the game. Eurogamer noted that marking mineral-rich planets alleviates the scanning, which was seen as a tedious feature in the main game. VanOrd concluded that Lair of the Shadow Broker is "worthy of your time (more than two hours) and your money."

At the 2010 Spike Video Game Awards, Lair of the Shadow Broker was nominated for Best DLC (downloadable content), but lost to Red Dead Redemption: Undead Nightmare. It won the Inside Gaming Award for Best DLC.
