= Demiurge Studios =

American video game developer

Demiurge Studios, Inc.
- Type: Subsidiary
- Industry: Video games
- Founded: 2002; 24 years ago in Pittsburgh, Pennsylvania, U.S.
- Founders: Albert Reed; Chris Linder; Tom Lin
- Headquarters: Cambridge, Massachusetts, U.S.
- Key people: Kurt Reiner (CEO); Bart Simon (president)
- Parent: Sega (2015–2020); Saber Interactive (2021–2024); Embracer Group (2024–present)
- Website: demiurgestudios.com

Demiurge Studios, Inc. is an American video game developer based in Cambridge, Massachusetts. It was founded in 2002 by Albert Reed, Chris Linder, and Tom Lin.

== History ==
The studio was originally founded in a residential house in Pittsburgh before moving to Boston with space provided by Harmonix. In August 2013, Looking Glass Studios co-founder Paul Neurath and Three Rings Design founder Daniel James joined Demiurge. In February 2015, Demiurge was acquired by Japan-based company Sega and became part of their mobile gaming subsidiary, Sega Networks. On April 2, 2020, Sega sold Demiurge Studios back to its co-founder and chairman Albert Reed, and Geoffrey Hyatt with plans to return to support work for AAA game studios.

On August 18, 2021, the company was acquired by Sweden-based Embracer Group and became a subsidiary of Saber Interactive. In March 2024, Embracer sold off Saber and many of its studios. However, Demiurge remains under Embracer.

== Games ==
Year	Title	Platform(s)
2002	FlipTrip	Windows
2009	Mass Effect: Pinnacle Station	Windows, Xbox 360
2012	Shoot Many Robots	Android, PlayStation 3, Windows, Xbox 360
2013	Marvel Puzzle Quest	Android, iOS, Windows
2015	Puzzle & Glory	Android, iOS
2017	Crazy Taxi Gazillionaire	Android, iOS
2018	Sega Heroes	Android, iOS
