= Virtual intelligence =

AI in a virtual world

Virtual intelligence (VI) is the term given to artificial intelligence that exists within a virtual world. Many virtual worlds have options for persistent avatars that provide information, training, role-playing, and social interactions.

The immersion in virtual worlds provides a platform for VI beyond the traditional paradigm of past user interfaces (UIs). What Alan Turing established as a benchmark for telling the difference between human and computerized intelligence was devoid of visual influences. With today's VI bots, virtual intelligence has evolved past the constraints of past testing into a new level of the machine's ability to demonstrate intelligence. The immersive features of these environments provide nonverbal elements that affect the realism provided by virtually intelligent agents.

Virtual intelligence is the intersection of these two technologies:

- Virtual environments: Immersive 3D spaces provide for collaboration, simulations, and role-playing interactions for training. Many of these virtual environments are currently being used for government and academic projects, including Second Life, VastPark, Olive, OpenSim, Outerra, Oracle's Open Wonderland, Duke University's Open Cobalt, and many others. Some of the commercial virtual worlds are also taking this technology into new directions, including the high-definition virtual world Blue Mars.
- Artificial intelligence (AI): AI is a branch of computer science that aims to create intelligent machines capable of performing tasks that typically require human intelligence. VI is a type of AI that operates within virtual environments to simulate human-like interactions and responses.

== Applications ==
- Cutlass Bomb Disposal Robot: Northrop Grumman developed a virtual training opportunity because of the prohibitive real-world cost and dangers associated with bomb disposal. By replicating a complicated system without having to learn advanced code, the virtual robot has no risk of damage, trainee safety hazards, or accessibility constraints.
- MyCyberTwin: NASA is among the companies that have used the MyCyberTwin AI technologies. They used it for the Phoenix rover in the virtual world Second Life. Their MyCyberTwin used a programmed profile to relay information about what the Phoenix rover was doing and its purpose.
- Second China: The University of Florida developed the "Second China" project as an immersive training experience for learning how to interact with the culture and language in a foreign country. Students are immersed in an environment that provides role-playing challenges coupled with language and cultural sensitivities magnified during country-level diplomatic missions or during times of potential conflict or regional destabilization. The virtual training provides participants with opportunities to access information, take part in guided learning scenarios, communicate, collaborate, and role-play. While China was the country for the prototype, this model can be modified for use with any culture to help better understand social and cultural interactions and see how other people think and what their actions imply.
- Duke School of Nursing Training Simulation: Extreme Reality developed virtual training to test critical thinking with a nurse performing trained procedures to identify critical data to make decisions and performing the correct steps for intervention. Bots are programmed to respond to the nurse's actions as the patient with their conditions improving if the nurse performs the correct actions.

== See also ==
- Artificial conversational entity
- Autonomous agent
- Avatar (computing)
- Embodied agent
- Multi-Agent System
- Intelligent agent
- Non-player character
- Player character
- Virtual reality
- X.A.N.A.

== Sources ==
1. Virtual Intelligence, David Burden and Dave Fliesen, ModSim World Canada, June 2010
2. Sun Tzu Virtual Intelligence demonstration, MODSIM World, October 2009
