= Casey Hudson =

Canadian video game designer

- Education: University of Alberta
- Occupation: Game developer
- Known for: Star Wars: Knights of the Old Republic; Mass Effect trilogy

Casey Hudson is a Canadian video game developer, known for his work on several of BioWare's video games, and mainly the Mass Effect trilogy as game director.

== Biography ==
After obtaining a degree in mechanical engineering, Hudson began his career at the Canadian video game developer BioWare with credits as a technical artist on several games, including MDK 2. He eventually became the project director of Star Wars: Knights of the Old Republic. Hudson fulfilled the same role in the development of the Mass Effect trilogy, a series of games based on a new science fiction intellectual property.

On August 7, 2014, Hudson left BioWare to pursue other projects. On May 18, 2015, Microsoft announced that Hudson had joined their video game production wing at Microsoft Studios as creative director. On July 18, 2017, Hudson announced that he had returned to BioWare and replaced Aaryn Flynn as general manager for the studio.

Hudson announced he was departing BioWare a second time on December 3, 2020.

In June 2021, Hudson announced that he had established a video game company, Humanoid Origin, acquired by NetEase. However, the company was closed on November 25, 2024.

On December 11, 2025, it was announced during the Game Awards 2025 that Hudson was directing Star Wars: Fate of the Old Republic, a narrative-driven, single-player RPG developed by Arcanaut Studios.

== Games ==
- MDK 2 (2000) – Level Design and Art
- Baldur's Gate II: Shadows of Amn (2000) – Programming and Engineering
- Neverwinter Nights (2002) – Art
- Star Wars: Knights of the Old Republic (2003) – Director and Producer
- Jade Empire (2005) – Additional work
- Mass Effect (2007) – Director
- Mass Effect Galaxy (2009) – Executive Producer and Franchise Production Management
- Mass Effect 2 (2010) – Director and Executive Producer
- Mass Effect 3 (2012) – Director
- Baldur's Gate II: Enhanced Edition (2013) – Additional work
- Anthem (2019) – Studio General Manager
- Mass Effect Legendary Edition (2021) – Studio General Manager
- Star Wars: Fate of the Old Republic (Upcoming)
