= Mass Effect 2 =

2010 video game

- Developer: BioWare
- Publishers: Electronic Arts; Microsoft Game Studios (Note: Microsoft published the Xbox 360 version and the Windows physical version.)
- Director: Casey Hudson
- Producers: Casey Hudson; Jesse Houston; Nathan Plewes
- Designer: Preston Watamaniuk
- Programmer: David Falkner
- Artist: Derek Watts
- Writers: Mac Walters; Drew Karpyshyn
- Composers: Jack Wall; Jimmy Hinson; Sam Hulick; David Kates
- Series: Mass Effect
- Engine: Unreal Engine 3
- Platforms: Windows; Xbox 360; PlayStation 3
- Release: January 26, 2010: Windows, Xbox 360; NA: January 26, 2010; AU: January 28, 2010; EU: January 29, 2010 PlayStation 3; NA: January 18, 2011; EU: January 21, 2011; AU: January 27, 2011
- Genres: Action role-playing, third-person shooter
- Mode: Single-player

Mass Effect 2 is a 2010 action role-playing game developed by BioWare and published by Microsoft Game Studios and Electronic Arts. It was released for Windows and the Xbox 360 in January 2010, as well as the PlayStation 3 the following year. It is the second installment in the Mass Effect series and a sequel to the original Mass Effect. The game takes place within the Milky Way galaxy during the 22nd century, where humanity is threatened by an insectoid alien race known as the Collectors. The player assumes the role of Commander Shepard, an elite human soldier who must assemble and gain the loyalty of a diverse team to stop the Collectors in a suicide mission. Using a completed saved game of its predecessor, the player can impact the game's story in numerous ways.

For the game, BioWare changed several gameplay elements and further emphasized third-person shooter aspects, including limited ammunition and regenerable health. In contrast to the exclusive focus on the main story of the original Mass Effect, the developers opted to create a plot where optional missions had as much intensity as the main mission. Mass Effect composer Jack Wall returned to compose Mass Effect 2's music, aiming for a darker and more mature sound to match the game's mood. Mass Effect 2 also supports a variety of downloadable content packs, ranging from single in-game character outfits to entirely new plot-related missions. Notable packs include Kasumi – Stolen Memory, Overlord, Lair of the Shadow Broker, and Arrival.

Released to critical acclaim, Mass Effect 2 was praised for its presentation and cinematography, diverse and complex characters, and improved combat over its predecessor. Some critics, however, expressed concerns about the game's simplified role-playing mechanics. The game received numerous year-end awards, including Game of the Year at the 14th Annual Interactive Achievement Awards, and Best Game at the 7th British Academy Games Awards. Mass Effect 2 is considered a significant improvement over its predecessor and one of the best video games of all time. A sequel, Mass Effect 3, was released in 2012. In 2021, Mass Effect 2 was remastered as part of the Mass Effect Legendary Edition.

== Gameplay ==
Mass Effect 2 is a single-player action role-playing game in which the player takes the role of Commander Shepard from a third-person perspective. Before the game begins, the player determines Shepard's gender, appearance, military background, combat training, and first name. The player may choose to import a character from a completed saved game of the original Mass Effect or start the game with a new character. Importing an old character allows several decisions the player made in the original game to impact the story of Mass Effect 2 and grants the player a set of starting bonuses. The game features six different character classes for the player to choose from. Each class is proficient in a different set of powers and weapon types. For example, the Vanguard class specializes in close-range combat and shotguns, while the Infiltrator class relies on stealth combat and sniper rifles.

The game's overworld is a galaxy map the player can explore to find and complete quests. Most quests consist of combat missions, but some involve the player interacting with non-player characters during visits to settlements. Different locations and new squad members become available as the player progresses throughout the game. Experience points are gained by completing quests. Each time a sufficient amount of experience is obtained, the player "levels up" and is awarded Squad Points that can be used to develop powers for Shepard and squad members. Powers provide enhanced combat capabilities, with each power having four ranks that can be unlocked. Each rank costs the same number of Squad Points as its rank. For example, unlocking the first rank of a power requires one point, but unlocking all four ranks of a single power requires a total of ten points. Upon raising a power to its fourth rank, the player must evolve the power into one of two given forms.

The player's primary mode of transportation is a starship which serves as Shepard's base of operations. Aboard the ship, the player can interact with the squad members, customize the player's armour, travel to numerous planetary systems, and scan planets for mineral resources. These resources allow the player to research numerous in-game upgrades found in the missions, providing benefits such as increasing weapon damage, fortifying the player's health, or extending the ship's fuel capacity, among others. Scanning requires the player to move a reticle over a planet and launch a probe when an oscilloscope warns of near resources. Additional upgrades, equipment, and non-essential items such as magazines and decorations for the ship can be purchased from merchants in settlements.

=== Combat ===
In combat, the player can pause the action to calmly target enemies and select different powers for the squad members. The enemy's life bars are shown in a frame at the top of the screen.

Combat in Mass Effect 2 is squad-based, and a maximum of two squad members may accompany the player on the battlefield. The player controls Shepard, while the game's artificial intelligence controls the squad members. Battles take place in real-time, but the player can pause the action at any time to calmly target enemies and select different powers for the squad members to use. The game uses an over-the-shoulder perspective akin to a third-person shooter and emphasizes using cover to avoid taking damage while fighting enemy forces. The player may also issue commands to the squad members, such as sending them to take cover behind a manually picked object or focus their fire on a designated target.

Unlike the original Mass Effect, where weapons overheat if fired continuously for prolonged periods, the weapons of Mass Effect 2 have a finite magazine and must be reloaded after a certain number of shots. A damage-absorbing shield protects Shepard and the squad members. When the shield is fully depleted, further damage reduces the hit points of a secondary health meter. The shield bar and health meter regenerate when not taking fire for a brief period. The player can revive fallen squad members with the use of the Unity power. However, if Shepard dies, the player must start the game again from the last saved point.

All enemies are protected by health, shields, armour, barriers, or a combination thereof. Each type of protection has its vulnerabilities. For example, armour is usually vulnerable to powers such as Incinerate, which burns enemies over time, and weapons with a low rate of fire, such as sniper rifles and heavy pistols. In contrast, shields are vulnerable to powers such as Overload and rapid-firing weapons like submachine guns and assault rifles. Barriers are typically used by boss-type enemies and are vulnerable to certain weapons and powers. When an enemy's shields, armour, or barriers have all been depleted, the player can use status-effect powers such as Pull, which temporarily levitates targets into the air, incapacitating them. Other powers may temporarily benefit the player; for instance, Adrenaline Rush puts the player in bullet time. Powers do not require any expendable resource; they only have a global cooldown.

=== Dialogue and morality ===
During conversations with characters, Mass Effect 2 employs a radial command menu called Dialogue Wheel, where the player's dialogue options depend on wheel direction. The left side of the wheel is typically reserved for options that will continue the conversation in-depth, while options on the right side tend to move the conversation towards completion. Responses at the top are generally more polite and selfless, while those at the bottom are more aggressive and hostile. The game also introduces a context-sensitive interrupt system, allowing players to interrupt the conversation with direct actions at certain times. Dialogue choices impact how others react to Shepard, the rewards for completing missions, possible discounts from merchants, romances, and the Commander's morality.

Morality is measured by Paragon (charm) and Renegade (intimidate) points. These points affect the availability of new special Paragon and Renegade dialogue options with a significant impact on the game. For example, the game features some missions to gain the squad's loyalty. What the player does during one of these missions will determine whether they gain the loyalty of a squad member, which in turn will unlock a unique power and help in the final battle. Endings range from the entire team surviving to the entire team being killed, Shepard included, and everything in between. Upon completing the game, a New Game Plus option is unlocked, allowing players to replay the game using the same character with which they finished it.

== Synopsis ==
=== Setting and characters ===
Mass Effect 2 is set within the Milky Way galaxy during the 22nd century, where interstellar travel is possible through mass transit devices called Mass Relays, a technology believed to have been built by an extinct alien race known as the Protheans. A conglomerate body of governments known as the Citadel Council controls a large percentage of the galaxy and is responsible for maintaining law and order among races of the galactic community. Races that belong to the Citadel Council include humans, asari, salarians, and turians. Other alien races in the game include the reptilian krogan and drell, the environmental-suited quarians, and a hostile race of networked artificial intelligence called geth. During the events of the original Mass Effect, a geth army attempted to open a portal for the Reapers, a highly advanced machine race of synthetic-organic starships that are believed to eradicate all organic civilization every 50,000 years. The galactic community has since lived in fear of another possible invasion. Meanwhile, a human supremacist organization called Cerberus believes that humans deserve a greater role in the galactic community and supports the principle that any methods of advancing humanity's ascension are entirely justified, including illegal experimentation and terrorist activities.

The game's protagonist is Commander Shepard (voiced by Mark Meer or Jennifer Hale), an elite human soldier who is the Commanding Officer of the SSV Normandy and Normandy SR-2 starships. Shepard's squad members include Cerberus operatives Jacob Taylor (Adam Lazarre-White) and Miranda Lawson (Yvonne Strahovski), recurring associates Garrus Vakarian (Brandon Keener) and Tali'Zorah (Liz Sroka), salarian scientist Mordin Solus (Michael Beattie), human criminal Jack (Courtenay Taylor), genetically engineered krogan super soldier Grunt (Steve Blum), drell assassin Thane Krios (Keythe Farley), asari Justicar Samara (Maggie Baird) or Samara's serial killer daughter Morinth (Natalia Cigliuti), and geth mobile platform Legion (D. C. Douglas). Other characters include the Normandy's pilot Jeff "Joker" Moreau (Seth Green), Cerberus leader the Illusive Man (Martin Sheen), and the Normandy SR-2's enhanced defence intelligence, also known as EDI (Tricia Helfer).

=== Plot ===
In 2183, shortly after the events of Mass Effect, the SSV Normandy, while patrolling for geth resistance, is attacked by an unknown vessel, forcing the crew to abandon ship. Shepard pushes Joker into the final escape pod before being blasted into space and dying via asphyxiation after a suit breach. The body is pulled into the orbit of a nearby planet and recovered by Cerberus, who begins the "Lazarus Project" with the sole purpose of bringing Shepard back to life. Two years later, Shepard is revived on an operating table and escapes a research station under attack by its security mechs. Escaping alongside Jacob Taylor and Miranda Lawson, Shepard is brought to meet the Illusive Man, who reveals that entire populations of human colonies have disappeared all over the galaxy. Now working with Cerberus, Shepard is sent to investigate a recently attacked colony, encountering Tali and a contingent of quarians searching for their missing colleague. Shepard's team uncover clues that the Reapers are working by proxy through an insectoid alien race called the Collectors, who have abducted the colonists.

The Illusive Man explains that the Collectors reside beyond the Omega-4 Relay, a place from which no ship has ever returned, and tasks Shepard with assembling a team to stop them. Shepard is also given command of a new starship, the Normandy SR-2, piloted again by Joker and equipped with an onboard AI named EDI. Shepard recruits Mordin Solus, Garrus Vakarian, Jack, and (optionally) Grunt, before the Illusive Man informs them that another human colony is under attack. Shepard defends the colony with the help of Mordin's studies on Collector biology, but cannot stop a large portion of the population from being captured. Shepard can then recruit Tali, Thane Krios, and Samara (who may be optionally replaced by Morinth) before being sent to explore a supposedly disabled Collector ship. There, Shepard learns that the Collectors were originally Protheans that were turned into slaves of the Reapers. With EDI's help, Shepard also finds out how to bypass the Omega-4 Relay before being ambushed by the Collectors. Although Shepard's squad escapes, their relationship with the Illusive Man is strained due to his prior knowledge of the trap.

Shepard visits a derelict Reaper and acquires an IFF necessary to travel through the Omega-4 Relay safely. Shepard also acquires a disabled geth that, if activated, joins the squad as Legion. While the IFF is integrated into the Normandy SR-2 systems, Shepard and the squad leave in a shuttle. During their absence, the Collectors board the Normandy SR-2. Only Joker avoids capture and, with EDI's help, extracts the Normandy SR-2 to safety. When Shepard's squad returns, the team uses the Omega-4 Relay to reach the Collector base located in the Galactic Center. After a ship-to-ship engagement with automated Collector defense drones a damaged Normandy SR-2 encounters and destroys the starship the collectors use to harvest the human colonists, however the battle disables the Normandy SR-2 and results in the ship making an emergency landing on the exterior of the collector base. While Joker and EDI work to repair the ship, Shepard's team members infiltrate the collector base, rescue any surviving crew members, and fight their way to the central chamber. Squad members will either survive or perish depending on the upgrades made to the Normandy SR-2, their loyalty to Shepard, and the tasks they are assigned in battle.

In the central chamber, Shepard discovers that the Collectors have been constructing a new Human-Reaper made from the genetic material of the abducted colonists. Destroying the machine powering the Reaper, Shepard prepares to destroy the Collector base by attaching explosives to the base's reactor. However, the Illusive Man proposes sterilizing the base with a timed radiation pulse to preserve the Collectors' technology and use it against the Reapers. After deciding the base's fate, Shepard destroys the awakened Human-Reaper and escapes with the surviving squad members. If no squad members survive, Shepard fails to escape and dies. While the collector base explodes, Harbinger promises Shepard the end for humanity, and then it is revealed that he has been controlling the Collector ship captain the whole time, before releasing him from his control. Back on the Normandy SR-2, after speaking with the Illusive Man one last time, Shepard meets the survivors in the cargo bay. There, Joker gives them schematics of a Reaper. The final scene shows the Reapers awakening in dark space and descending upon the galaxy.

== Development ==
=== Game design ===
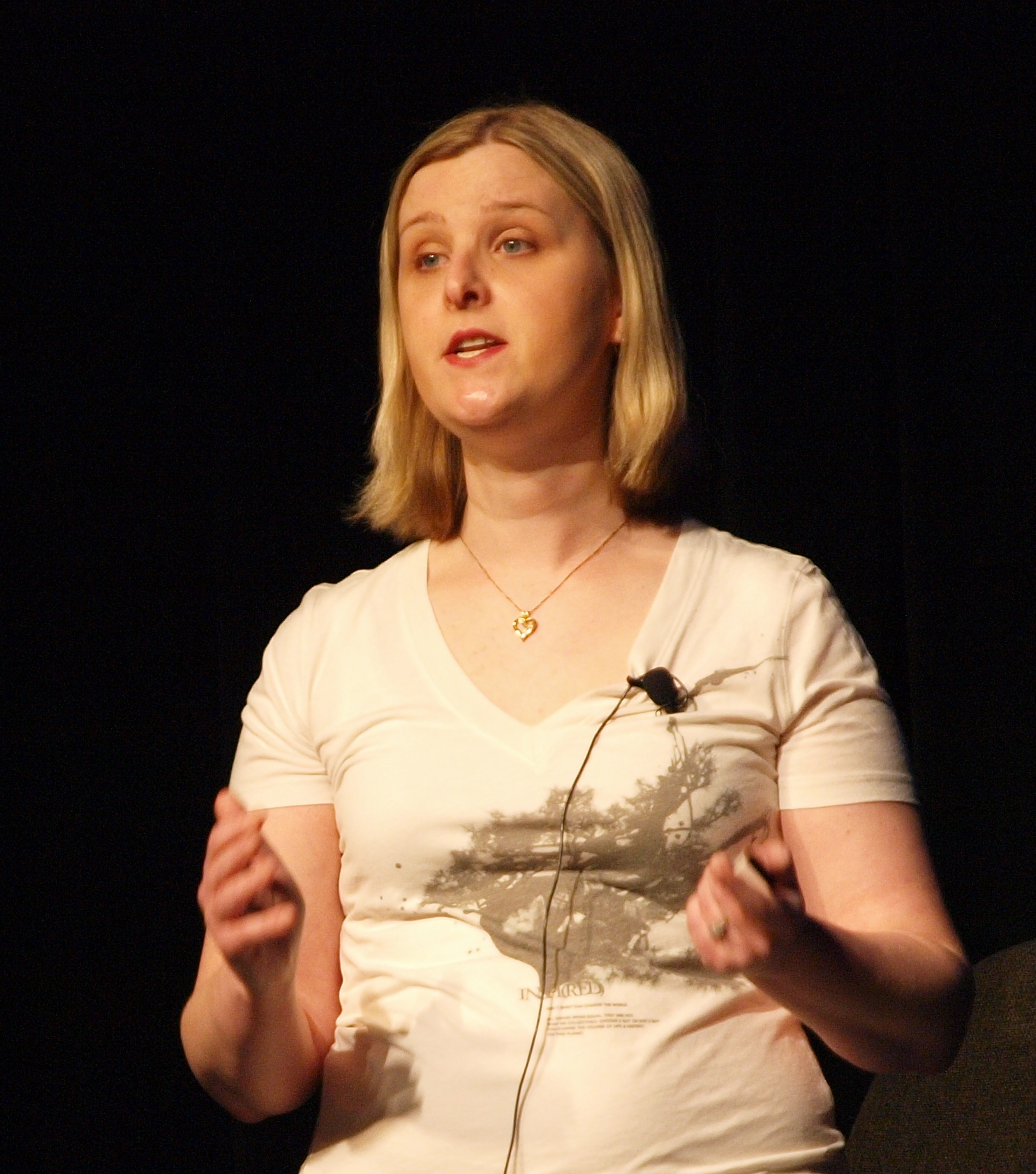
Lead gameplay designer Christina Norman at the 2010 Game Developers Conference

Mass Effect 2 was developed by BioWare and directed by Casey Hudson, who previously led the production of the first Mass Effect game. Before actual production began, BioWare created a list of goals to work towards based on feedback from fans, reviewers, and internal staff members. The company's main goal was to "create an experience that was less about being a game and more about being an experience." In contrast to the exclusive focus on the main story of the original Mass Effect, Hudson explained that BioWare was interested in a plot where optional stories had as much intensity as the main story and decided that the idea of recruiting people and making them loyal to the player so that they could survive a suicide mission allowed to explore these possibilities. He noted, "the funny thing is that people will say 'other than gathering your crew and building your team and getting ready for this mission, there's not much story there.' But that is the story."

During the first stages of development, the designers prioritized streamlining and polishing the shooting aspects; RPG elements were not added until this process was complete. According to lead designer Christina Norman, "we wanted more satisfying combat and a big part of that is making weapons more accurate and powerful at level one—basically saying 'let's take the RPG out of the shooter.'" Since BioWare had no experience with shooter games, the team spent roughly three months tuning how combat would work using the original Mass Effect as a basis. The camera was improved to offer a more precise aiming that included body-specific targeting like headshots. Norman explained that they wanted the weapons to have their own identity, noting that the game's final build has 19 weapons with 108 tuning variables. The inclusion of limited ammunition was initially not part of the game design and was implemented for some early playtesting. However, the developers ultimately felt it improved the tension and pacing of combat.

Real-time gameplay with an emphasis on weapons and cover was a preference because the team felt that the constant pausing to select powers interrupts the intensity of the combat. As a result, more options were added to assign different abilities to the user interface for real-time use. Developers also decided to introduce regenerating health because it prevented players from playing erratically and relying on health kits. Norman remarked that it was important not to oversimplify the RPG elements but to make them easier to use. She explained that the original Mass Effect offered "too many choices that weren't particularly representative of how they would impact the game. In Mass Effect 2, the levelling options were pared down and made more descriptive." The developers wanted to create very different play styles for the character classes, "even if it meant cutting some of the possible choices." The powers were balanced with a unified refresh cooldown since the earlier system, where powers could be used sequentially, was considered "ridiculous and endgame easy."

Keeping track of the enemies' strengths and weaknesses was made more consistent with different types of health bars so that players did not have to estimate the challenges they faced when fighting new enemies. The game's HUD was revised eight times during development. As the inventory management of the original Mass Effect received criticism, designing a new inventory system for Mass Effect 2 was one of the main concerns during development. Ideally, the inventory needed to handle many characters with simplicity. Norman spent time examining various inventory systems from other RPG games, but none could be applied to support the game's large number of characters. Ultimately, the team opted to replace it with different systems that provide the same functionality without any management. This concept allowed a character to use a weapon without taking it away from someone else.

The planetary exploration of the original Mass Effect was revamped entirely. Instead of having vast barren landscapes, the designers opted to build distinct and interesting places. The goal was to encourage players to keep exploring the galaxy by changing their expectations about what they could find. Initially, the developers experimented with the idea of having a vehicle that could be used to navigate the planetary terrain more flexibly than in the original title. However, the vehicle was ultimately removed from the game's final build. The context-sensitive interrupt system, which was initially meant to be a feature in the original Mass Effect, was introduced in Mass Effect 2 to help blend the dialogue better with the rest of the action. The story's pacing was also improved because developers wanted to get players into the action faster.

=== Production ===
Since the Mass Effect series was envisioned as a trilogy from its inception, work on Mass Effect 2 started shortly before the original Mass Effect was released. The game was initially developed exclusively for the Windows and Xbox 360 platforms with support provided by Microsoft Game Studios, focusing to have the same level of dedication. As a result, each version features different user interfaces and controls. Like its predecessor, Mass Effect 2 was built using Epic Games' Unreal Engine 3 in conjunction with a framework that BioWare specifically developed for the Mass Effect games. As most of these Mass Effect technologies were already developed in the first game, the development team focused on adding new content and perfecting new features rather than creating them from scratch. Technical improvements included better memory management, larger textures, a higher frame rate, and better lighting scenarios. According to Hudson, "I actually can't think of an aspect of the game that we haven't overhauled and made 100% better."

Mass Effect 2 contains voices from 90 voice actors who play 546 characters and speak over 25,000 lines of dialogue. Voice recording for the game took twice as long as the original Mass Effect. The Unreal Engine 3's Matinee tool, allowing developers to animate characters during cinematics, was integrated into BioWare's digital acting and conversation technology. As Hudson explained, "Our writers write into a dialogue editor and that becomes fused with the way that you end up seeing many different pieces of Matinee play out in combination when you have a conversation with characters." Another Unreal Engine 3 technology, Kismet, was used for scripting how levels or enemies would respond to a particular action. After using it on the first Mass Effect game, the game's programmers were already familiar with Unreal Engine 3, so they did not need to communicate with Epic Games for support constantly.

Although Mass Effect 2 was primarily developed at BioWare's Edmonton studio, a new team of 30 people was set to work at EA Montreal in March 2009 to supplement the teams already working on the game. The new team was composed of many people who worked on the original game, but most were new hires. Mass Effect 2 was developed over roughly two years and more than 150 people worked on the game. Hudson mentioned two significant challenges that interfered with the development: financial problems due to the Great Recession limited the game's budget, and the team had to get through it without impacting their ambitious goals. Additionally, due to the 2009 flu pandemic, a significant part of the team was ill during the last months of development, resulting in losing a man-year of time. Despite these factors, Hudson described the development of Mass Effect 2 as successful "on time, on budget, and exceeding quality goals." Lead writer Mac Walters considered Mass Effect 2 a very quick project, stating that the team did not have much time to second guess themselves.

Initially, BioWare denied that a PlayStation 3 version was in the works. Despite this, it was reported that the Microsoft Windows version of the game featured lines of code referencing the PlayStation 3. BioWare responded that the Unreal Engine 3 is cross-platform, which is why it includes PlayStation 3 code. Eventually, a PlayStation 3 version of Mass Effect 2 was released a year later than the Microsoft Windows and Xbox 360 versions. The PlayStation 3 version uses a modified version of the Unreal Engine 3 called the Mass Effect 3 engine, the same engine BioWare used for the then-upcoming Mass Effect 3. In this newer version, character models were slightly improved, and controls were updated to support the PlayStation 3 controller. An option which allowed to switch back to the Xbox 360 controls layout was also added.

=== Music ===
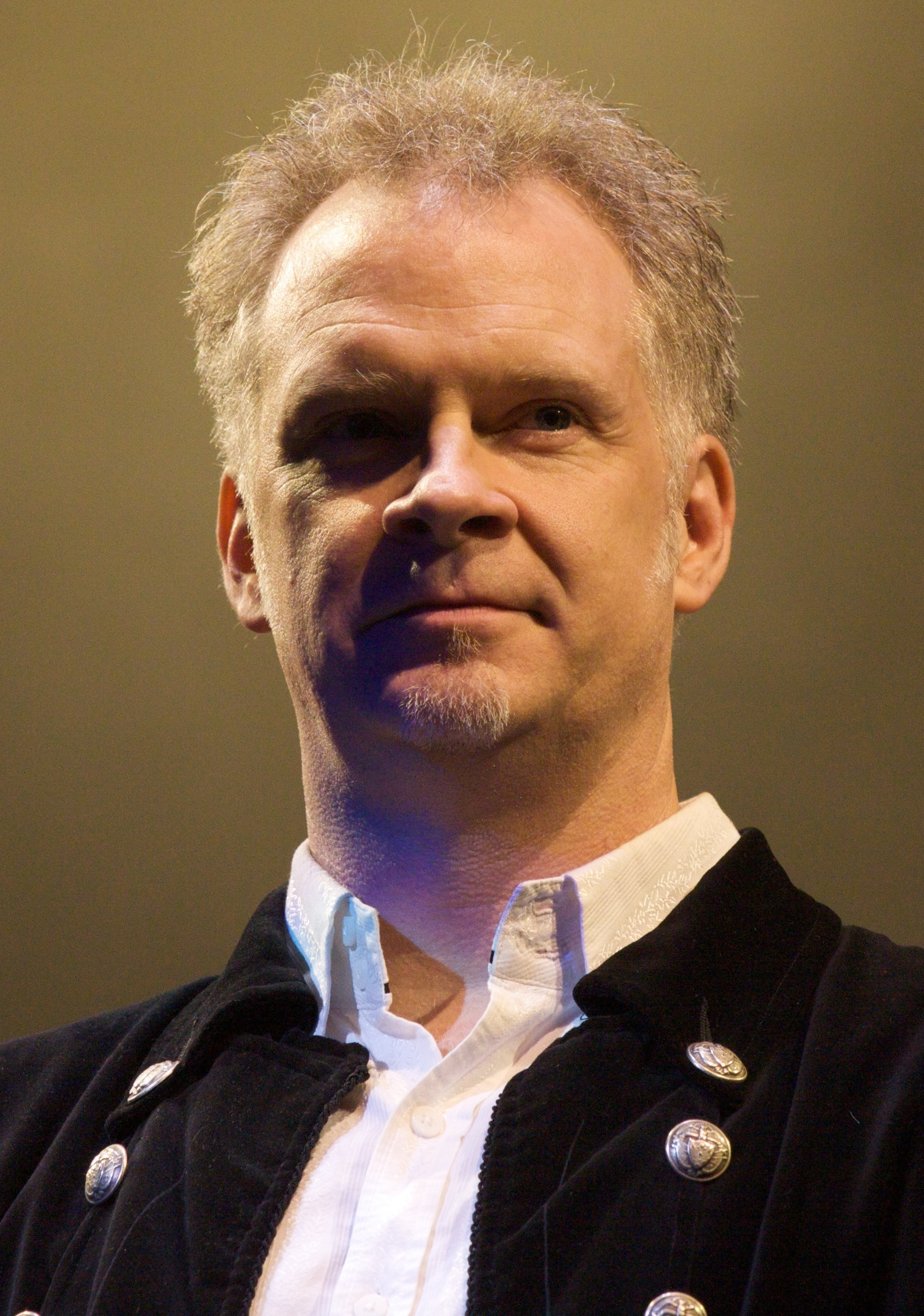
Jack Wall returned to compose Mass Effect 2's music, aiming for a darker and more mature sound to match the mood of the game.

The music of Mass Effect 2 was primarily composed by Jack Wall. His previous work with BioWare was as the main composer for Jade Empire and the original Mass Effect. The score also features some pieces by Sam Hulick, David Kates, and Jimmy Hinson (better known as Big Giant Circles), with additional editing and in-game implementation by Brian DiDomenico. Unlike the original Mass Effect, the composers aimed for a darker and more mature sound to match the game's mood. The music incorporates orchestral and classic sci-fi arrangements, inspired by the soundtrack of the 1982 film Blade Runner and music by German electronic group Tangerine Dream. The harmonic structure of Wendy Carlos's Tron soundtrack also represented significant influences. To complement each character, the composers gave them themes to convey their personalities and backgrounds. According to Kates, "it was one of our mandates to create a dynamic score that expressed a wide range of emotions."

Around 180 minutes of music were composed for Mass Effect 2, which totalled more than 700 assets. The song "Callista" by video game music composer Saki Kaskas, who wrote the music for five Need for Speed games, was used as the game's Afterlife Club theme. Music from the game has been released in several albums. BioWare released the main soundtrack album, Mass Effect 2: Original Videogame Score, on January 19, 2010. The soundtrack spans two discs and 27 tracks, covering a duration of 1:55:43. Mass Effect 2's score was nominated for Best Original Music at the 7th British Academy Games Awards and Best Soundtrack Album at the 9th Annual Game Audio Network Guild Awards. In 2012, Legacy, an album composed mostly of tracks written for Mass Effect 2 but not used in the game, was released by Big Giant Circles.

== Marketing and release ==
Mass Effect 2 was formally unveiled at the Game Developers Conference on March 17, 2009, and a teaser trailer declared Shepard "killed in action". The announcement confirmed that the game would be released for Windows and Xbox 360. In June 2009, the game was presented at the Electronic Entertainment Expo, where it was confirmed that Shepard would be alive and playable in Mass Effect 2, but the character could die at the end of the game. Players could receive new in-game armours and weapons if the game were pre-ordered at certain retailers. Players could also redeem codes on specially marked Dr Pepper products for one of three pieces of headgear and registered copies of Dragon Age: Origins for a new armour set. In the months leading up to the game's release, BioWare released a final cinematic trailer and launched six class trailers narrated by Norman. Electronic Arts sold-in more than two million copies of the game to worldwide retailers for its first week of release.

Mass Effect 2 was initially released for Windows and Xbox 360 by Microsoft Game Studios in partnership with Electronic Arts on January 26, 2010, in North America and on January 29, 2010, in Europe. Microsoft published the Xbox 360 version, as well the Windows physical version. Alongside the standard edition, digital deluxe and collector's editions were available. The collector's edition featured a different packaging, an artbook, bonus in-game content, a behind-the-scenes DVD, and one issue from the Mass Effect: Redemption comic series. Although Mass Effect 2 was released at the end of the month, it became the second best-selling game of January 2010 with 572,100 units sold, behind Nintendo's New Super Mario Bros. Wii. Shortly after Mass Effect 2 was released, the game's font size and colouring were criticized for being too difficult to read on some standard-definition televisions. Because BioWare considered it a design choice, the company could not resolve it but stated that they would consider it for future games. In February 2010, BioWare released a patch that addressed minor issues such as crashes and long load times on single-core computers. A second patch, which reduced the mining time required to acquire upgrades and fixed other minor issues, was released in June 2010.

At Gamescom 2010, BioWare announced that a PlayStation 3 version of the game was in development. Microsoft responded to the announcement that, despite losing the game's exclusivity, the Xbox 360 was still the most appropriate console to play the game due to the game's compatibility with the original Mass Effect, which was only available for Microsoft Windows and Xbox 360 at the time. The PlayStation 3 version was released on January 18, 2011, in North America and on January 21, 2011, in Europe. It was one of the first games Electronic Arts shipped without a paper manual, a decision made as part of a green-packaging initiative. After some PlayStation 3 players reported that their save files can become corrupted if the game crashes unexpectedly, BioWare released a patch designed to combat save bugs and crashes experienced. The PlayStation Network version accounted for more than 10% of the game's overall sales on PlayStation 3. As of April 2011, it was reported that the original Mass Effect and Mass Effect 2 combined had sold more than seven million units worldwide, 77% coming from Xbox 360.

New game purchases are provided with a one-time use card granting an access code that unlocks the game's Cerberus Network, an online downloadable content and news service that enables bonus content for the game. However, users who bought a used copy would have to pay for the Cerberus Network separately if they wanted access to the new content. This policy allows publishers to combat the used-game market; companies like GameStop have allowed customers to sell used games back to the retailer so that the company can resell them at a slight discount to other customers, but the publisher does not make a profit. BioWare online development director Fernando Melo revealed that 11% of all Mass Effect 2's downloadable content revenue came from the Cerberus Network. The policy attracted criticism from some of the fan community, who have criticized downloadable content as being overpriced and an incentive for developers to leave items out of the initial release.

In 2012, a compilation featuring the three main games of the series, Mass Effect Trilogy, was released for Microsoft Windows, Xbox 360, and PlayStation 3. In 2016, Mass Effect 2 was added to the list of backward-compatible Xbox 360 games on Xbox One. In 2021, Mass Effect 2 was remastered as part of the Mass Effect Legendary Edition.

=== Downloadable content ===
Mass Effect 2 supports additional in-game content in the form of downloadable content packs released from January 2010 to May 2011. These packs range from character outfits to entirely new plot-related missions. Major releases include Lair of the Shadow Broker and Arrival, which are vital to the series' plot. In Lair of the Shadow Broker, Shepard helps former squad member Liara T'Soni to find an information dealer known as the Shadow Broker. In Arrival, Shepard investigates evidence of a Reaper invasion, leading to events that bridge to Mass Effect 3. Other plot-related downloadable content packs include the loyalty missions Zaeed – The Price of Revenge and Kasumi – Stolen Memory, and Overlord, which adds five new missions to the game.

Unlike the Xbox 360 and Microsoft Windows versions, the PlayStation 3 version includes the Kasumi – Stolen Memory, Overlord, and Lair of the Shadow Broker packs. Because the first Mass Effect game was originally not released on PlayStation 3, BioWare released Genesis, a downloadable content pack that allows the player to impact the story of the game with major plot decisions of the first game. These decisions are made through a digital interactive comic appearing at the game's beginning. Genesis was released on May 17, 2011, for Microsoft Windows and Xbox 360 users. Some of the game's downloadable content packs were well received by critics and nominated for Best DLC (downloadable content) at the Spike Video Game Awards.

== Reception ==
=== Critical response ===
Reception

Aggregate score
Aggregator	Score
Metacritic	94/100 (PC); 96/100 (X360); 94/100 (PS3)

Review scores
Publication	Score
1Up.com	A−
Edge	9/10
Eurogamer	10/10
Famitsu	35/40 (PS3); 36/40 (X360)
Game Informer	9.5/10 (PS3); 9.75/10 (X360)
GamePro	4.5/5
GameRevolution	A−
GameSpot	8.5/10 (PS3); 9/10 (X360)
GameSpy	5/5
GameTrailers	9.7/10
IGN	9.5/10 (PS3); 9.6/10 (X360)
GameCritics.com	7.5/10
RPGamer	4.5/5

Upon release, Mass Effect 2 received critical acclaim from video game publications. Substantial praise was given to the game's diverse characters, interactive storytelling, voice acting and art design. IGN reviewer Erik Brudvig called Mass Effect 2 a personal game with much emotion. He praised the option of importing a character, stating that the overall experience changes as different saved games from the previous game are used. Tom Bramwell of Eurogamer positively highlighted the weight of social interaction on the outcome of events and that players feel actual pressure for their decisions. Further praise was given to the game's characters. Edge credited them for their complex personalities and great characterization, while GameRevolution pointed out that the loyalty missions "reach deep enough into their characters to make you empathize with all of them".

The game's visuals and atmosphere received similar praise. GameSpot reviewer Kevin VanOrd remarked that Mass Effect 2 is more detailed and darker than its predecessor. He wrote that "deep reds and glowing indigos saturate certain scenes, making them richer and more sinister; eerie fog limits your vision in one side mission, while rain pours down upon you in another. Subtle, moody lighting gives certain interactions great impact." Reviewer Adriaan den Ouden of RPGamer credited the conversations and cutscenes for featuring better cinematography than the first game, stating that "it's hard to imagine them becoming much better in Mass Effect 3". Critics also gave high marks to the game's extensive cast of voices; in particular, Martin Sheen's performance of the Illusive Man, which was singled out for "steal[ing] the show". Andrew Reiner, writing for Game Informer, opined that the music "flows beautifully" in both the story and action sequences. The game's presentation and direction were considered "miles ahead of the competition".

Numerous publications declared that the gameplay was an improvement over the original. John Davison of GamePro wrote, "BioWare has done a spectacular job moving the role playing genre forward, and blending disparate gameplay styles into genuinely exciting sci-fi epic." VanOrd praised Mass Effect 2 for possessing an identity, which was something that its predecessor lacked. He noted that the shooting is "more immediate and satisfying, which keeps the pace moving and intensifies the violence of each encounter". Similarly, GameSpy's Gerald Villoria observed that the original Mass Effect "walked the line between RPG and shooter [...] Mass Effect 2 has become a much more focused shooter experience". Jeremy Parish of 1UP.com credited the combat for being more balanced, stating that the game encourages players to use different weapon classes and squad abilities when the situation requires it. Some publications, however, expressed concerns about the game's simplified RPG elements, calling it "stripped-down" and with a "dumbed-down feeling". The game's slow planet scanning was also criticized. GameRevolution felt it was a "chore, mandatory if you want upgrades and boring because there is no tension or challenge", but ultimately concluded that the game as a whole "does more than enough to live up to its predecessor".

The reception for the PlayStation 3 version was similar. Colin Moriarty of IGN described it as "the best, most complete version of the game available" due to the upgraded game engine and the extra downloadable content packs. In contrast, VanOrd criticized the inclusion of the character Kasumi Goto from the Kasumi – Stolen Memory pack, stating that "she never fits in with her more fully developed cohorts." He also remarked that the PlayStation 3 version suffers from technical issues such as frame rate inconsistencies, graphical glitches, and other minor bugs, mostly present in the downloadable content sections of the game. Game Informer reviewer Joe Juba reacted negatively to the lack of save importation from the original Mass Effect, which was initially not released on PlayStation 3, and pointed out that the decisions made in the Genesis comic "have practically no context". Despite the criticism, he stated that the game is equally as good on PlayStation 3 as on Xbox 360.

=== Accolades ===
Mass Effect 2 received numerous Game of the Year awards for its writing, characters, and soundtrack. At the 2010 Spike Video Game Awards, the game won the Best Xbox 360 Game and Best RPG awards. BioWare was also recognized for its work on the game and was awarded Studio of the Year. At the 14th Annual Interactive Achievement Awards, the Academy of Interactive Arts & Sciences awarded Mass Effect 2 with Game of the Year, Role-Playing/Massively Multiplayer Game of the Year, and Outstanding Achievement in Story. Other notable awards that the game received include Best Game at the 7th British Academy Games Awards, Best Writing at the 2011 Game Developers Choice Awards, and two Golden Joystick Awards: Best RPG of the Year and Ultimate Game of the Year. At the 2011 Canadian Videogame Awards, Mass Effect 2 was awarded Game of the Year, Best Console Game, Best Game Design, and Best Writing.

List of awards and nominations

Award	Date of ceremony	Category	Recipient	Result	Ref(s)
Game Critics Awards	June 23, 2009	Best of Show	Mass Effect 2	Nominated	
Game Critics Awards	June 23, 2009	Best Console Game	Mass Effect 2	Nominated	
Game Critics Awards	June 23, 2009	Best Role Playing Game	Mass Effect 2	Won	
Spike Video Game Awards	December 12, 2009	Most Anticipated Game	Mass Effect 2	Nominated	
Visual Effects Society Awards	February 10, 2010	Outstanding Visual Effects in a Video Game Trailer	Tim Miller, Brandon Riza, Dave Wilson	Nominated	
Golden Joystick Awards	October 29, 2010	RPG of the Year	Mass Effect 2	Won	
Golden Joystick Awards	October 29, 2010	Ultimate Game of the Year	Mass Effect 2	Won	
Spike Video Game Awards	December 11, 2010	Game of the Year	Mass Effect 2	Nominated	
Spike Video Game Awards	December 11, 2010	Studio of the Year	BioWare for Mass Effect 2	Won	
Spike Video Game Awards	December 11, 2010	Best Xbox 360 Game	Mass Effect 2	Won	
Spike Video Game Awards	December 11, 2010	Best PC Game	Mass Effect 2	Nominated	
Spike Video Game Awards	December 11, 2010	Best RPG	Mass Effect 2	Won	
Spike Video Game Awards	December 11, 2010	Best Original Score	Mass Effect 2	Nominated	
Spike Video Game Awards	December 11, 2010	Best Performance By A Human Male	Martin Sheen as Illusive Man	Nominated	
Spike Video Game Awards	December 11, 2010	Best Performance By A Human Female	Jennifer Hale as Commander Shepard	Nominated	
Spike Video Game Awards	December 11, 2010	Best Performance By A Human Female	Yvonne Strahovski as Miranda Lawson	Nominated	
Spike Video Game Awards	December 11, 2010	Best DLC	Mass Effect 2: Lair of the Shadow Broker	Nominated	
Interactive Achievement Awards	February 11, 2011	Game of the Year	Mass Effect 2	Won	
Interactive Achievement Awards	February 11, 2011	Outstanding Achievement in Game Direction	Mass Effect 2	Nominated	
Interactive Achievement Awards	February 11, 2011	Outstanding Achievement in Story	Mass Effect 2	Won	
Interactive Achievement Awards	February 11, 2011	Outstanding Character Performance	Mark Meer as Male Commander Shepard	Nominated	
Interactive Achievement Awards	February 11, 2011	Role-Playing/Massively Multiplayer Game of the Year	Mass Effect 2	Won	
Game Developers Choice Awards	March 2, 2011	Game of the Year	Mass Effect 2	Nominated	
Game Developers Choice Awards	March 2, 2011	Best Writing	Mass Effect 2	Won	
Game Developers Choice Awards	March 2, 2011	Best Game Design	Mass Effect 2	Nominated	
Game Developers Choice Awards	March 2, 2011	Best Technology	Mass Effect 2	Nominated	
Game Developers Choice Awards	March 2, 2011	Best Audio	Mass Effect 2	Nominated	
Game Audio Network Guild Awards	March 3, 2011	Best Soundtrack Album	Mass Effect 2	Nominated	
British Academy Games Awards	March 16, 2011	Artistic Achievement	Mass Effect 2	Nominated	
British Academy Games Awards	March 16, 2011	Best Game	Mass Effect 2	Won	
British Academy Games Awards	March 16, 2011	Gameplay	Mass Effect 2	Nominated	
British Academy Games Awards	March 16, 2011	Original Music	Mass Effect 2	Nominated	
British Academy Games Awards	March 16, 2011	Story	Mass Effect 2	Nominated	
British Academy Games Awards	March 16, 2011	GAME Award of 2010	Mass Effect 2	Nominated	
Canadian Videogame Awards	May 18, 2011	Game of the Year	Mass Effect 2	Won	
Canadian Videogame Awards	May 18, 2011	Best Console Game	Mass Effect 2	Won	
Canadian Videogame Awards	May 18, 2011	Best Audio	Mass Effect 2	Nominated	
Canadian Videogame Awards	May 18, 2011	Best Game Design	Mass Effect 2	Won	
Canadian Videogame Awards	May 18, 2011	Best Technology	Mass Effect 2	Nominated	
Canadian Videogame Awards	May 18, 2011	Best Visual Arts	Mass Effect 2	Nominated	
Canadian Videogame Awards	May 18, 2011	Best Writing	Mass Effect 2	Won	
Spike Video Game Awards	December 10, 2011	Best DLC	Mass Effect 2: Arrival	Nominated	
Spike Video Game Awards	December 7, 2012	Best Game of the Decade	Mass Effect 2	Nominated	

== Legacy ==
Mass Effect 2 continued to receive attention years after its release. GamesRadar editor Hollander Cooper explained that the game improved the technical issues of its predecessor significantly while at the same time "expanding the already-impressive universe without sacrificing what made the series special." He went so far as to call the game The Empire Strikes Back of video games, stating that "few sequels have trumped the original as handily as Mass Effect 2." The game's focus on characters and their deeper stresses and internal conflicts was highly praised. The way the game lets non-player characters carry the weight of the narrative progression has also attracted scholarly interest. Eurogamer editor Rick Lane described Mass Effect 2 as a darker, warmer, and overall more human game than its predecessor, noting that it is the player's responsibility to make sure these characters are prepared for the final mission, or they will die. He explained that Mass Effect 2 is a long quest that "works towards an epic climax", and when it arrives there, "it doesn't disappoint." A decade after the game was released, Eurogamer considered the game's finale "some of BioWare's best ever work" due to its choice complexity.

Mass Effect 2 has been cited as one of the greatest video games of all time by multiple publications, including Slant Magazine in 2014, IGN in 2015, Polygon in 2017, Game Informer in 2018, and GQ in 2023. In 2011, the game was selected as one of 80 titles from the past 40 years to be placed in the Art of Video Games exhibit in the Smithsonian American Art Museum. According to the museum, the exhibit explored "the 40-year evolution of video games as an artistic medium, with a focus on striking visual effects and the creative use of new technologies."

== Sequel ==
The game's sequel, Mass Effect 3, was released in 2012. The sequel begins on Earth with Commander Shepard having been detained following the events in the Arrival downloadable content pack. The story of the game is influenced by decisions the player made in the original Mass Effect and Mass Effect 2. However, if Shepard dies at the end of Mass Effect 2, the character cannot be imported into Mass Effect 3. BioWare stated that Mass Effect 3 ends Shepard's story arc and that future games in the series would feature a different context. Unlike its predecessors, Mass Effect 3 features a multiplayer cooperative mode in addition to the single-player campaign. Although the game received critical acclaim from video game publications, its ending was poorly received by fans and drew significant controversy.
