= Mass Effect Legendary Edition =

Compilation of the video games in the Mass Effect trilogy

- Developer: BioWare
- Publisher: Electronic Arts
- Director: Mac Walters
- Producer: Melanie Faulknor
- Programmer: Darrin Stewart
- Series: Mass Effect
- Engine: Unreal Engine 3
- Platforms: PlayStation 4; Windows; Xbox One
- Release: May 14, 2021
- Genres: Action role-playing, third-person shooter
- Mode: Single-player

Mass Effect Legendary Edition is a compilation of the video games in the Mass Effect trilogy: Mass Effect (2007), Mass Effect 2 (2010), and Mass Effect 3 (2012). Developed by BioWare and published by Electronic Arts, the compilation was released on May 14, 2021, for PlayStation 4, Windows, and Xbox One. All three games were remastered, with visual enhancements, technical improvements, and gameplay adjustments. Mass Effect, the first game of the trilogy, received more extensive upgrades than its counterparts, specifically with regard to graphics, combat mechanics, vehicle handling, and loading times.

Development on the Legendary Edition commenced in 2019 under the direction of Mac Walters, who previously served as lead writer for Mass Effect 2 and Mass Effect 3. BioWare decided to approach the project as a remaster as opposed to a remake in order to preserve the original trilogy experience. Legendary Edition received very positive reviews from video game publications, who praised the enhanced experience of the first game in addition to the convenience and scope of the overall package. Minor criticism was aimed at the extent of the gameplay and visual changes in certain regards.

== Contents ==
In Legendary Edition, Mass Effect has received more extensive upgrades than its sequels, including a new HUD.

Mass Effect Legendary Edition contains single-player base content from all three titles in the Mass Effect trilogy: Mass Effect (2007), Mass Effect 2 (2010), and Mass Effect 3 (2012). The compilation also includes almost all single-player downloadable content (DLC) that was originally released for each game, such as promotional weapons, armors, and packs. (Note: The Pinnacle Station pack from Mass Effect is not included in Legendary Edition.) The trilogy consists of action role-playing games in which the player assumes the role of Commander Shepard, an elite human soldier who must unite the galactic community against a highly advanced machine race of synthetic-organic starships known as Reapers. Shepard is a customizable character whose gender, appearance, military background, combat training, and first name are determined by the player. During each game, the player makes choices that can impact the story in various ways, including consequences that can be carried forward through the trilogy.

All three titles were remastered for Legendary Edition, which includes updated textures, shaders, models, effects, and technical features. The games also run in sharper resolutions and at higher frames per second than their original counterparts. The compilation allows players to start all three titles from a single menu and a universal character creator that includes customization options for all three games. The default female Commander Shepard model from Mass Effect 3, which was previously unavailable in prior installments, is now usable across the trilogy. The second and third entries feature similar gameplay to their original versions but have received some adjustments, such as the rebalancing of the "Galactic Readiness" system from Mass Effect 3. Also new to each game is a photo mode, which allows players to take adjustable in-game screenshots.

The first Mass Effect has received more extensive upgrades than its counterparts. The game includes additional visual updates, such as the addition of smoke effects and volumetric lighting to certain levels and modified skyboxes. Combat has been updated in an attempt to feel more consistent with the sequels, including improved aim assist with a stickier lock-on, a dedicated melee button, rebalanced weapons, and smarter enemy and squad artificial intelligence. Certain boss encounters have received adjustments in order to feel less frustrating, such as expanded levels and more frequent auto-saving. The Mako, which is an all-terrain vehicle that is primarily used by the player for traversal, has received a speed increase and updated physics. Exploration around the world has also been tweaked, such as reduced time spent in elevators that are utilized as a way to hide loading screens, which was a commonly criticized aspect of the original game.

== Development ==
Mass Effect Legendary Edition was developed by BioWare and published by Electronic Arts. BioWare had previously discussed developing a remaster of the Mass Effect trilogy in 2014, but did not begin work on the project until 2019. Multiple support studios were contracted to assist with development, including Abstraction Games and Blind Squirrel Games. The former aided with the adaptation of each game for newer consoles, and helped with optimizations and improvements, mostly with regard to graphics. The overall project was directed by Mac Walters, who previously served as lead writer for Mass Effect 2 and Mass Effect 3.

Early in the development process, BioWare consulted with Epic Games to determine the feasibility of porting the games from their original engine, Unreal Engine 3, to Unreal Engine 4. BioWare eventually determined that the amount of work required to do so was significant, and would involve remaking large aspects of the games, such as redoing all cinematic scenes. They were also concerned that an overhaul of that magnitude would fundamentally change and take away from the original trilogy experience. Based on these findings, BioWare decided to keep the games on their original engine, and also to approach the project as a remaster as opposed to a remake. Due to its complicated nature and potential impact on the project's timeline, BioWare also decided that the Mass Effect 3 multiplayer mode would not be included. The team intended to include all single-player DLC in the package but was unable to include the Pinnacle Station pack from Mass Effect because its source code was corrupted, which Walters described as "heartbreaking".

As part of the remastering process, BioWare increased resolutions for all textures throughout the trilogy, which was accomplished by utilizing an artificial intelligence upscaling program and other custom tools. Once those initial visual upgrades were complete, the art department began manual work on assets, character models, and environments. After reviewing each game for potential changes, the team concluded that certain camera angles of female characters were either gratuitous or in need of improvement, so they moved ahead with alterations to some original shots. By the spring of 2020, Legendary Edition entered a "baseline" state where the games were fully playable and BioWare's first round of improvements had been implemented. However, the team felt that the original Mass Effect was still lagging behind the other games in terms of visuals, so they brought in the game's original art director, Derek Watts, to add new details and effects. The original game also received a significant amount of gameplay updates, which was done in order to modernize the experience and to remove inconsistencies with its sequels. These updates included adjustments to boss encounters that were originally deemed "painful" for players, which required the involvement of one of the game's original level designers. The compilation was released to manufacturing on April 9, 2021.

== Release ==
Mass Effect Legendary Edition was officially announced on November 7, 2020, which is also known as "N7 Day", a date declared by BioWare as an annual celebration of the Mass Effect franchise. The compilation was released for PlayStation 4, Windows, and Xbox One on May 14, 2021. Although it runs and features targeted enhancements on PlayStation 5 and Xbox Series X/S through backward compatibility, BioWare has no plans to release versions of Legendary Edition specifically for those consoles. In an interview, Walters stated that while he would like to port the compilation to Nintendo Switch, that console was outside the project's scope.

== Reception ==
Reception

Aggregate scores
| Aggregator | Score |
|---|---|
| Metacritic | PC: 86/100; PS4: 87/100; XB1: 90/100 |
| OpenCritic | 96% |

Review scores
| Publication | Score |
|---|---|
| Destructoid | 9/10 |
| Game Informer | 9/10 |
| GameSpot | 8/10 |
| GamesRadar+ | 4.5/5 |
| IGN | (ME1) 8/10 (ME2) 9/10 (ME3) 8/10 |
| PC Gamer (US) | (ME1) 77/100 |
| Push Square | 9/10 |
| RPGamer | 4/5 |

According to the review aggregator Metacritic, the Windows and PlayStation 4 versions of Mass Effect Legendary Edition received "generally favorable reviews" whereas the Xbox One version received "universal acclaim" from video game publications. According to OpenCritic, 96% of 122 critic reviews recommend the game.

Critics generally felt that the first Mass Effect, which received more extensive upgrades than its sequels, was significantly improved in Legendary Edition. Alyssa Mercante of GamesRadar+ opined that the changes to the game resulted in a more modern experience, and that BioWare successfully brought the game more in line with its sequels without detracting from its original charm. Shubhankar Parijat of GamingBolt asserted that the remaster was one of the most impressive that he had seen, which he attributed to the extensive work done to assets, environments, lighting, and character models. By contrast, some critics felt that the visual changes went too far and ultimately overshadowed the original's mood and tone, while other critics felt that the gameplay updates did not go far enough.

Reviewers responded positively to Mass Effect 2 and Mass Effect 3 in Legendary Edition despite those games receiving relatively minor updates. Writing for Destructoid, Eric Van Allen praised the adjustments made to the morality system of Mass Effect 2, which he felt made the game feel less unforgiving. Dan Stapleton of IGN opined that the graphical improvements made to Mass Effect 2 made it look comparable to a modern release, with the main exception being its facial animations. In his evaluation of Mass Effect 3, Robert Ramsey of Push Square noted that the inclusion of expansions that were not available with the base version of the game resulted in a meaningfully enhanced experience. By contrast, Jordan Ramée of GameSpot criticized the compilation for not integrating DLC well into the overall narrative of the individual games.

As an overall product, Legendary Edition received praise for its convenience, scope, and preservation of the Mass Effect trilogy. Writing for The Washington Post, Jhaan Elker recommended the compilation to fans and newcomers alike, with the qualification that some players may still prefer the original version of the games with mods. In a performance review for Eurogamer, Thomas Morgan highlighted the ambition and effort of the collection, and concluded that the final result was a "perfect jumping on point for the series". In her review for Game Informer, Kimberly Wallace lauded the Mass Effect trilogy as a whole, and expressed gratitude towards the remaster for keeping attention on the series and giving players an opportunity to easily play through the story in its most complete form, with all DLC included.

=== Sales ===
In the United Kingdom, Legendary Edition was the best selling game during its week of release, which was mostly due to digital sales. Also during the week of its release, the Windows version of the game had over 59,000 concurrent players on Steam, which was the highest concurrent player count to date for a BioWare title. On the PlayStation Store, Legendary Edition was the third-highest selling game in the United States and the sixth-highest selling game in Europe for May 2021. During an investor call on August 4, 2021, Electronic Arts Chief Executive Officer Andrew Wilson revealed that the game performed "well above" expectations, although exact sales figures were not disclosed. Legendary Edition finished 2021 as one of the 12-highest selling new releases of the year on Steam. According to The NPD Group, Legendary Edition was the 19th-best selling game on PlayStation and the 12th-best selling game on Xbox of 2021 overall.
