= Joker (Mass Effect) =

Supporting character in the Mass Effect series

Joker Jeff Moreau
- Mass Effect character
- Jeff "Joker" Moreau as he appears in Mass Effect Legendary Edition (2021)
- First appearance: Mass Effect (2007)
- Last appearance: Mass Effect 3: Citadel (2013)
- Voiced by: Seth Green

In-universe information
- Full name: Jeff Moreau
- Nickname: Joker
- Affiliation: Systems Alliance Navy
- Family: Unnamed parents Hilary (sister)
- Origin: Tiptree
- Occupation: Pilot in command of the Normandy
- Position: Flight Lieutenant

Jeff "Joker" Moreau is a character from BioWare's Mass Effect franchise. In the original Mass Effect video game trilogy, he is the pilot in command of the Normandy-class SR, a highly advanced series of spacecraft with stealth capabilities which serve as the base of operations for the player character, Commander Shepard. In Mass Effect 2, Joker briefly becomes a playable character when the Normandy is invaded and the majority of its crew captured by hostile forces. Outside of the video game series, Joker appears as the central character of the 2013 comic book, Mass Effect: He Who Laughs Best, which explores the backstory behind how he became the pilot of the Normandy. He is voiced by American actor Seth Green, who was given a level of creative freedom to improvise the character's dialogue during recording sessions.

The character's nickname alludes to his characterization as a sarcastic foil to other characters who interact with him. Joker has received critical acclaim reception by critics and have been recognized as one of the most notable examples of disability representation in video game medium. Aspects of Joker's characterization, such as his depiction as a skilled pilot who excels in spite of his limited mobility caused by a genetic disorder colloquially known as brittle bone disease, as well as his defensive attitude towards other characters who engage him in a conversation about his condition, has been the subject of scholarly analysis published in academic journals.

== Character overview ==
Jeff Moreau, better known by his nickname "Joker", is the human pilot of the Normandy, described as the most advanced military infiltration starship in the galaxy within the series. He is from a human colony called Tiptree, where his father and sister Hilary resides. Joker has Vrolik Syndrome, a genetic condition that causes extremely brittle bones. He was born with multiple leg fractures, has difficulty walking, and takes medication to manage his condition. As a result, he is usually confined to the helmsman's seat on the Normandy for the majority of his appearances. Joker overcompensates for his disability by developing his reputation and skills as a highly competent pilot. His personality is established as an individual who is very outspoken about his own achievements and capabilities. Joker earned his nickname from his flight school instructor, who used to “bug [him] about never smiling”

From Mass Effect 2 onwards, Joker serves as the pilot for the Normandy SR-2, the more advanced successor to the original Alliance commissioned spacecraft, where he works alongside the Enhanced Defense Intelligence or EDI, the spacecraft's integrated artificial intelligence (AI) system. Joker is initially unfriendly towards EDI, but gradually warms up to her over the course of Mass Effect 2's narrative. By Mass Effect 3, Joker may develop a relationship with EDI if encouraged by Shepard.

== Development and portrayal ==
Joker was originally designed with a more sickly appearance to emphasize his ill health. Mass Effect co creator Casey Hudson revealed in a 2011 tweet that Joker's face was modeled after an applicant from a BioWare Edmonton casting call. According to Mass Effect level designer Joe Hendriks, the cinematic designer for Joker's bar scene in Mass Effect 3: Citadel originally asked for ten minutes worth of cutscene time, but eventually conceded.

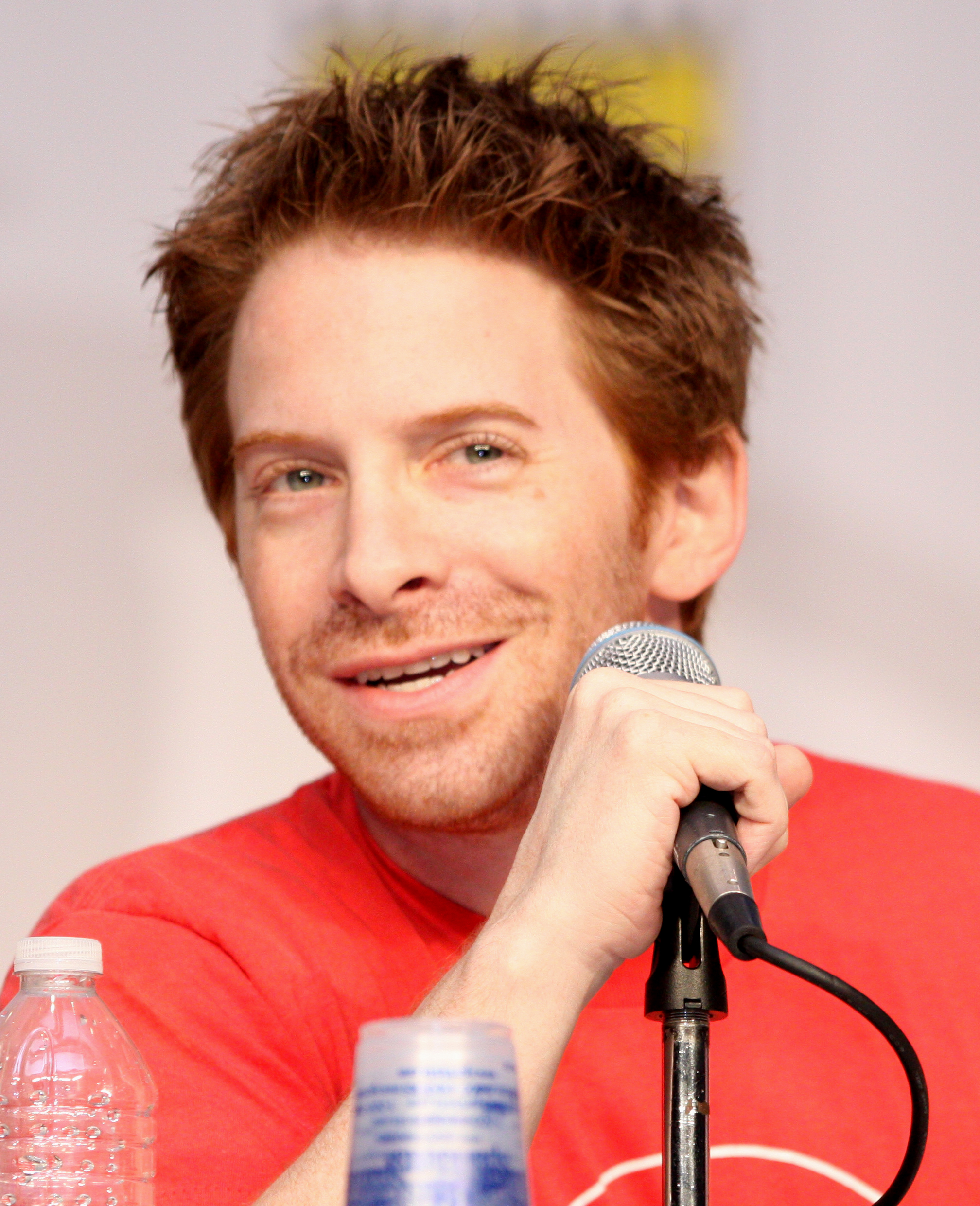
Seth Green in 2010.

Seth Green voiced Joker for the Mass Effect video game series. A prolific voice actor, Green claimed that he was frequently approached to do voice acting for video games since the 2000s, but turned down many offers as he was picky about the projects he wanted to work on. In an interview with MTV which was published a month before the release of the first Mass Effect, Green revealed that he decided to accept a role for the project as he thought Joker was a "cool character" and that it would be "a lot of fun". Green later said BioWare's work on the Mass Effect trilogy exceeded his expectations and he was continually impressed by the level of detail and quality of work in the development of the original game's sequels.

For the first Mass Effect, Green estimated that he recorded between four and six hours of voice acting work, which included planned recordings from the game's script as well as a few sessions which were set up on short notice due to changes in the game's development. Green found that the fluid dialogue system BioWare used for Mass Effect was similar to his Robot Chicken show as it was organized cue by cue: Green would record a block of dialogue for a scene and he would then be filled in on what is supposed to have happened within that scene, to which he would then attempt to use that contextual information to emotionally connect himself to the envisioned moment when reading the line. Green compared his work experience to the Choose Your Own Adventure interactive gamebook series, since he would record several potential options within a dialogue tree, which is determined by a specific direction chosen by the player.

Green was not obliged to strictly adhere to the script and was given some creative freedom to occasionally ad-lib Joker's reactions as long as it was contextually appropriate, particularly in conversations which do not involve a technical or gameplay instruction for the player's benefit. Green indicated that his take on Joker's personality, which was intended to be "sarcastic but unapologetic", was not influenced by any other character he had played prior to Mass Effect. He thought of Joker in the first Mass Effect as "an orphan with a chip on his shoulder" and "super bad-ass pilot" who knows he is the best in his profession and is unafraid to tell people about it. Green suggested that the character makes up for his shortcomings and weaknesses with an "acerbic wit" and "biting comedic spirit".

In promotional videos for subsequent Mass Effect sequels which featured Seth Green, he described Joker as a lone wolf who is uninterested in getting involved with any group. He also highlighted the character's interactions with EDI, and that he was enthusiastic about the opportunity to work with EDI's actress, Tricia Helfer. Green found his experience with the Mass Effect franchise to be very different from other media projects he had been involved with because of how fondly its fans feel about its characters, and that he has himself received a consistently warm fan reception over the years even though they do not know each other on a personal level.

== Appearances ==
=== Mass Effect ===
Joker is introduced in Mass Effect as the pilot in command of the SSV Normandy, an advanced prototype "deep scout" stealth frigate developed as part of a collaboration between the human Systems Alliance and the turians, an alien species who were once hostile to humanity. He provides vital support for Commander Shepard's squad in dangerous field operations such as evacuations, and has an ancillary role as a guide and confidant since he provides valuable intel which helps the squad stay on course a mission. In one of the final missions, Joker demonstrates his exemplary skill at piloting the Normandy by successfully dropping off a Mako tank in a landing zone that is much smaller than what is permitted by Systems Alliance regulations. Joker later participates in a climactic battle between the Citadel's defenders and an invading force led by the Reaper Sovereign, and manages to land a blow which tears apart Sovereign's incapacitated body using the Normandy's cannons.

=== Mass Effect 2 ===
During the opening sequence of Mass Effect 2, the Normandy is attacked and destroyed by a warship commandeered by a hostile alien species known as the Collectors. Prior to its destruction, Shepard convinces Joker, who initially refused to abandon ship, to retreat to the escape pods, but dies in the process. Two years after the incident, Joker is recruited by the anthropocentric paramilitary organization Cerberus to serve as the pilot for the Normandy SR-2. Joker reunites with a resurrected Shepard, but finds himself working alongside the ship's AI unit, EDI.

Joker is briefly playable during an incident where the Collectors invade the Normandy and capture its remaining crew while Shepard's squad is away from the ship. He is instructed by EDI to remove her behavioral constraints, which allows her to take full control of the ship's defense systems to repel the Collectors. Unlike Shepard, Joker moves slowly with a limp and cannot sprint for short distances. In the event that the outcome of the suicide mission results in the deaths of every member of the squad including Shepard, Joker is shown confronting the Illusive Man in an alternate version of the game's ending.

=== Mass Effect 3 ===
In Mass Effect 3, Joker continues to be the pilot of the Normandy SR-2, which has been claimed by the Alliance from Cerberus. At the commencement of the Reaper invasion of Earth during the game's opening sequence, Joker assumes control of the Normandy and evacuates Shepard from Earth, then charts a course to a Mars research facility to investigate a potential countermeasure against the Reaper threat in response to Admiral Steven Hackett's request. Joker's story arc in 3 follows his improving relationship with EDI, who has commandeered an android body following an incident at the Mars facility. In the game's original endings, the Normandy is hit by a wave of energy released after Shepard activates the Reaper countermeasure known as the Crucible on the Citadel in spite of Joker's frantic efforts to evade it, and crashes on a remote planet.

In the Citadel DLC, Joker makes up an exaggerated story of how he took over a mech and killed an improbable number of opponents. During this, he says, "Welcome to the island of Dr. Me" which is an allusion the classic science-fiction novel, The Island of Dr. Moreau by H.G. Wells.

Subsequent post-launch downloadable content elaborates on Joker's potential fate along with the surviving crew of the Normandy, which varies depending on the player's choices throughout the game's narrative.

=== Mass Effect: He Who Laughs Best ===
Mass Effect: He Who Laughs Best, a single-issue comic released on May 4, 2013, for Free Comic Book Day 2013, explores how Joker became the pilot of the SSV Normandy prior to the events of Mass Effect. Joker is first seen as a shuttle pilot transporting a turian general named General Invectus, who is tasked with overseeing recruitment trials for the position of pilot of the Normandy. When he sees Joker with crutches after they arrive at Acturus station, Invectus remarks that he would never trust the ship with a cripple. To prove a point that he is a competent pilot who is not given opportunities because of discriminatory attitudes towards his condition, Joker hijacks the Normandy and takes the ship through the trial course, and successfully completes it while being pursued by station security. Although Joker is threatened with a court martial and imprisonment upon his return, Invectus is impressed by Joker's ability to exploit gaps in the ship's security and run the Normandy through the trials with time to spare while under weapon fire. He gives a recommendation that Joker be made the Normandy's pilot, which is actioned by the ship's inaugural captain, David Anderson.

== Reception ==
Joker has received widespread acclaim reception from critics. Chloe Williams from TheGamer considered Joker to be one of the best designed characters in the series. Bitmob regarded Joker as the "Dolorous Edd of Mass Effect", with praise for the character's role as an effective source of comic relief in Mass Effect as well as Seth Green's casting as the character. Kate Cox from Kotaku praised Green for lending essential tension-breaking humor to the Mass Effect series through his voice work as a bold and impertinent spaceship pilot. VideoGamer.com staff considered the destruction of the original Normandy and EDI taking control of the second Normandy, both scenarios where Joker plays a pivotal role, to be among the very best moments from the first Mass Effect games. Christopher Chiu-Tabet from Multiversity Comics praised He Who Laughs Best as a fun story, but felt that the art style employed by its artist did not do justice to Joker's scene in the comic's final panel, where he realizes that his stunt actually worked.

Joker has been recognized as one of the most notable or visible examples of disability representation in video games. Da Silva Leite cited Joker as an exemplary demonstration of how a video game's narrative could meet accessibility guideline principles of non-discrimination and respect for differences, since he is primarily presented by his characteristics as a ship's pilot in the universe of Mass Effect as opposed to his mobility disability. Online disability lifestyle publication Disability Horizons published an article in 2021 which highlights Joker as the best representation of disability in the Mass Effect trilogy due to his consistent portrayal as a competent and unique individual. The International Journal of Computer Game Research published two articles, in 2018 and 2020 respectively, which critically analyzed Joker's representation as a character with disabilities.

=== Analysis ===
An essay by Amanda Joyal published in 2012 examines Joker within the context of the "supercrip," a term used by disability theorists to discuss characters who are perceived as possessing extraordinary talent because of, or in spite of, their disability. Joyal contrasted Joker's "supercrip" role with the "normate" player-controlled Commander Shepard. While Joker allows the player to view disability as something other than physical suffering, Joyal observed that the inhabitants of the Mass Effect universe are all deeply reliant upon new technology, which essentially redefines the "normate" body as one that includes prosthesis, even as Joker is defined as the "other" due to his extraordinary capability of flying the Normandy. Joyal was particularly critical of how camera angles and character positions in the first Mass Effect's cut-scenes contribute to the construction of Joker as the subordinate "other" against which Shepard's "normate" body, because Joker is frequently seen looking up to Shepard from his chair while Shepard's gaze or the player's camera perspective is angled down on him. Joyal argued that the game's representational choices deliberately divert attention from bodies that could potentially be an uncomfortable sight for the player, and consequently privileges ability over disability. Noting that his mobility appears to have increased in the sequel as he was mostly immobile in the previous game by comparison, Joyal interpreted and analyzed how a potential cure for his disability allows Joker to take on the more traditional role of the hero figure that would not be possible for a typical disabled character. She concluded that Joker is in essence a character "designed for the able-bodied player" because he "has to become more able-bodied in order to become a heroic figure" and that the Normandy acts as his prosthesis, a sign of empowerment and super-ability as opposed to a reminder of his disability.

Theresa Krampe examined how hegemonic masculinity embodied by the default male Shepard is constructed and deconstructed as compared with Joker's "otherness", and how themes of disability, violence, grotesque modification and virtuality challenge the integrity of the "normate" male body or the player's own physicality. Krampe suggested that Joker's characterization as a physically disabled character and his constant defensiveness in his conversations with the able-bodied protagonist is an example of the Mass Effect series' attempt at positioning queer masculinity prominently, which challenges the "dominance of the white, heterosexual, attractive, male videogame protagonist" in the video game industry. She compared the self-disclosure of his identity as a physically disabled person in the first Mass Effect to that of the real world act of coming out by LGBT individuals due to their similar dynamics of power and knowledge. In this sense, Krampe posited that Joker's portrayal is one example of how mass-market videogames can reclaim cultural space for marginalized subject positions. On the other hand, Krampe concurred with Joyal's analysis of problematic aspects of Joker's portrayal. She noted that while it is plausible that players may achieve come to understand and/or empathize the restrictions faced by people with physical disabilities from the brief playable segment as Joker in Mass Effect 2, she concluded that the character's subversive potential is somewhat ambivalent because in order to save the day, he ends up losing his "otherness" to become closer to the hegemonic ideal represented by the player character.

Adan Jerreat-Poole interpreted Joker's depiction in the video game series as a signifier that the futuristic setting of Mass Effect is one that remains ableist and invested in hegemonic settler masculinity. However, Jerreat-Poole's reading of Joker's body, movement, and language during his appearances in the Mass Effect trilogy led him to conclude that the character is overall a positive depiction of disability because he demonstrate agency through his tone of voice. Jerreat-Poole interpreted Joker's frequent use of sarcasm in his conversations with others as a critique of the cultural narratives of ableism as well as what he termed "crip exceptionalism and overcoming": examples of in-game dialogue were highlighted to support the notion that Joker asserts agency through volunteering information about himself on his own terms, and that he talks about his condition through mockery and ridicule, which exposes the ableist attitudes of mainstream society and registers complaint against a healthcare system that intends to "fix" him. He wrote that Joker's unapologetically slow movements and considerably less mobile body stands out in a universe filled with superhuman abilities or technological enhancements, and interprets his refusal to be fixed or sped up as a resistance to the hypermasculinist ableism that is prevalent and widely celebrated in the action video game genre. To Jerreat-Poole, Joker's abrasive attitude during conversations about his disability echoes what Sara Ahmed describe as "willful moments of resistance" in her publication Willful Subjects, and that the character embodies the "crip killjoy" who identifies and undermines the dominant ideology's expectations through his refusal to hide or cure his disability.
