= EDI (Mass Effect) =

Fictional character in the Mass Effect series

EDI Enhanced Defense Intelligence
- Mass Effect character
- EDI as she appears in Mass Effect 3 (2012)
- First appearance: Mass Effect 2 (2010)
- Voiced by: Tricia Helfer

In-universe information
- Affiliation: Cerberus (Mass Effect 2); Systems Alliance (Mass Effect 3)

EDI (/ˈiːdiː/ EE-dee), short for Enhanced Defense Intelligence, is a character in BioWare's Mass Effect franchise. The character first appears as a non-player character in Mass Effect 2, playing the role of the artificial intelligence aboard the Normandy SR-2, the game's main spaceship and hub. In Mass Effect 3, EDI returns as a party member (or "squadmate"). EDI is voiced by Canadian and American actress Tricia Helfer.

In designing EDI's body in Mass Effect 3, the Mass Effect art team found inspiration in Maria from Fritz Lang's Metropolis, wanting to give her a "sexy, chrome and robotic" appearance. Narratively, EDI was designed to contrast with Legion, the other main robotic character of the series. Throughout the series, EDI begins as a ship AI bound by programming limitations before gradually taking on a more active role in the story. In Mass Effect 3 she acquires a physical body and the player is allowed to encourage a relationship between the Normandy's pilot, Joker, and her. Depending on the player's choices at the end of Mass Effect 3, EDI may not survive the game's conclusion.

EDI has attracted significant attention in the cosplay, fan art, and modding communities. Her representation in the Mass Effect trilogy, particularly her design and relationship with Joker, has generated substantial commentary and critical analysis, with reviewers praising her characterization while expressing concern over her sexualization in Mass Effect 3. Scholars and critics have also examined her role as an artificial intelligence, analyzing her dialogue and her relationship with Joker.

== Concept and design ==
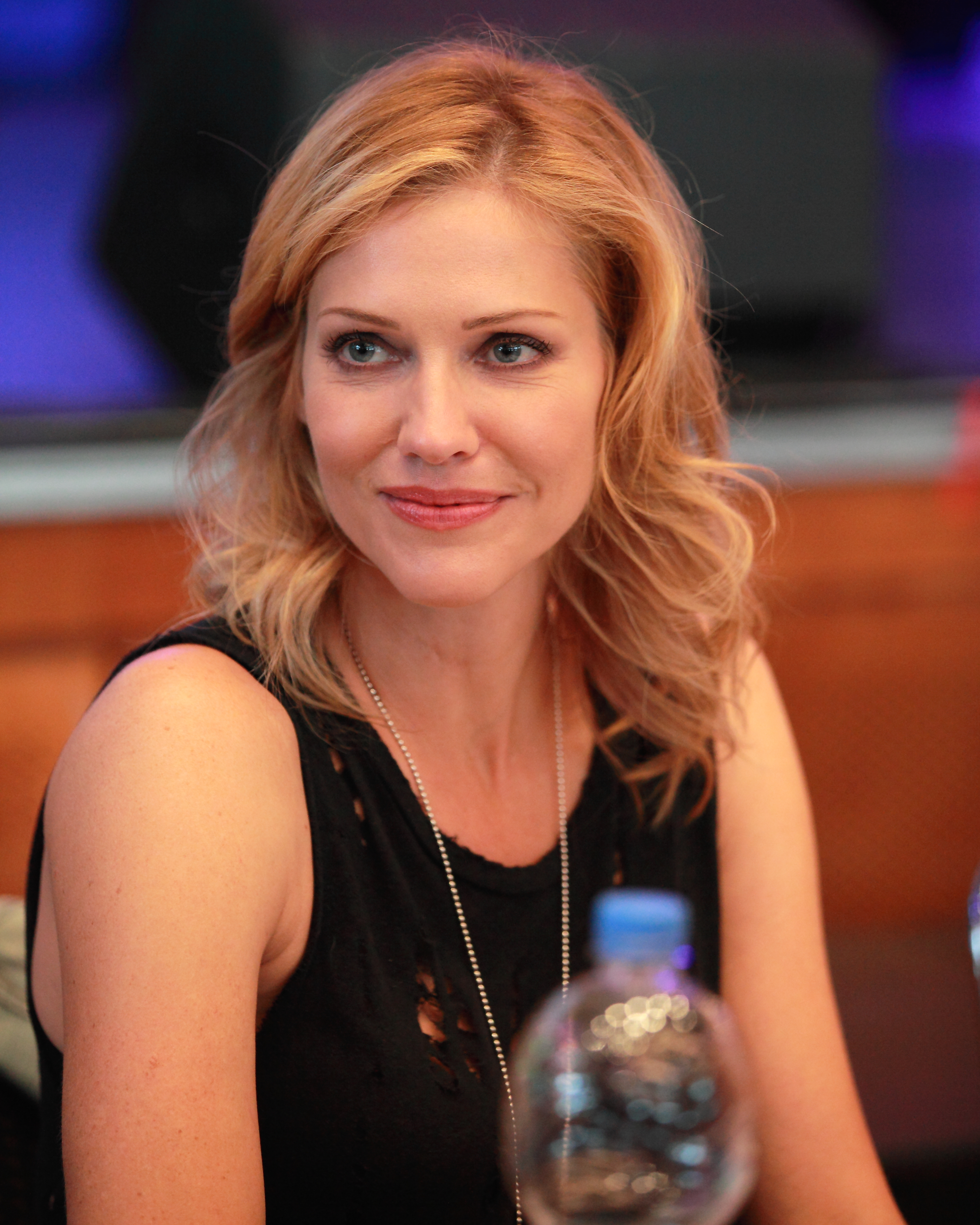
Tricia Helfer provides the voice for EDI.

Chris Helper, one of EDI's writers, stated that she had been written to contrast with Legion, Mass Effect's other main robotic character. Whereas Legion was depicted as humorless and alien in nature, EDI was designed to be more relatable, characterized by her curiosity towards the humans around her. Helper stated that EDI's capacity to be humorous was intended to distinguish her from the artificial intelligence (AI) assistants in other video games.

For her body's design in Mass Effect 3, the Mass Effect art team wanted to give EDI a "sexy, chrome and robotic" appearance, inspired by Maria from Fritz Lang's silent film Metropolis (1927). Early concepts initially portrayed EDI's body through a model without eyes, instead having a set of holographic eyes. This concept was finally discarded due to constraints regarding the digital acting system used by BioWare during the development of the game. For the final design, the team debated how robotic it would be, how her hair would look like and whether or not her face would be expressive. They ultimately decided for EDI to have the same facial effects as other humans, as the body had been design as an infiltration unit that "once had skin over the metal". The result features a great level of detail, with a body that was split between solid and transparent surfaces, resulting in a two-tone appearance.

In Geoff Keighley's The Final Hours of Mass Effect 3, former series producer Casey Hudson stated that EDI's body had been designed to raise questions regarding whether love could arise between an individual and a robot, referring to the possible relationship that can occur between the Normandy's pilot Joker and EDI in Mass Effect 3. Hudson further described their love-hate relationship in Mass Effect 2 as a "platonic symbiosis". Members of the writing team Sylvia Feketekuty and Trick Weekes, stated that EDI's relationship with Joker allowed her to do more than what she had already been designed to do as an assistant artificial intelligence.

In Mass Effect 2 and Mass Effect 3, EDI was voiced by Canadian and American actress Tricia Helfer. Helfer described her work as EDI on the franchise as fun but streamlined, limited to "reading loose sentences in a booth". In a 2014 interview, Helfer acknowledged that with the then-upcoming Mass Effect: Andromeda heading in a new direction, EDI's return seemed unlikely; however, she expressed openness to taking on a different role in the franchise.

== Appearances ==
=== Mass Effect 2 ===
EDI's design in Mass Effect 2

Mass Effect 2 starts with the game's protagonist, Commander Shepard, dying in the destruction of their spaceship, the Normandy SR-1. Shepard is then resurrected by Cerberus, a human-supremacist organization with controversial methods and goals, who also built an upgraded version of the Normandy. The game then introduces EDI, short for Enhanced Defense Intelligence, as the Normandy SR-2's artificial intelligence, depicted as a spherical hologram that appears at various terminals throughout the ship and that is limited by her programming. Throughout the game, EDI is shown to be a supportive system that provides Shepard with information and aid as situations arise during the narrative. EDI has control of all of the Normandy's vital systems, capable of shutting them down at any moment, though she never acts on it. The game also establishes a conflicting relationship between EDI and the Normandy's pilot, Joker. This relationship is initially portrayed as antagonistic, with EDI and Joker arguing constantly and addressing each other in formal terms: EDI refers to Joker as "Mr. Moreau" and Joker to EDI as "it". This dynamic shifts toward the end of the game, with EDI first-naming Joker and him beginning to refer to EDI as "her". EDI is also responsible for giving the character Legion his name when she makes an analogy between his condition as a gestalt intelligence and the biblical story of the exorcism of the Gerasene demoniac in Mark 5:9. If Shepard attempts to scan the planet Uranus for resources, EDI will make a joke regarding the planet's name.

Approaching the final mission of the game, the Normandy is boarded by the Collectors, an alien species that was being controlled by the Reapers, a set of gigantic space-faring leviathans, to abduct human colonists. EDI guides Joker throughout the ship in Shepard's absence, ultimately unshackling EDI from her programming and allowing her to manually control the ship and escape.

=== Mass Effect 3 ===
Mass Effect 3 takes place amid an ongoing invasion by the Reapers. During one of the beginning sections of the game, EDI acquires a body from a robotic Cerberus agent by the name of Eva Coré. This body allows EDI to become a party member or "squadmate" in the game, being able to join Shepard on missions.

Mass Effect 3 further expands EDI and Joker's relationship, giving the player the option to encourage Joker to seek a romantic relationship with EDI. Throughout the game EDI asks Shepard for advice regarding this possible romantic relationship, with EDI usually taking this advice literally instead of figuratively. The game further focuses on EDI's character and has her develop human characteristics, with EDI questioning her place within the galaxy and her relationship with Joker, at one point invoking a quote from Frankenstein when she questions her place in the relationship. EDI further questions her role, stating that she does not belong with any of the Mass Effect robotic species, being the Geth and the Reapers, nor with the humans, reaching the conclusion that she is "free but alone". After a conversation near the end of the game, EDI rewrites her self-preservation protocols to allow her to sacrifice her own life to save another person's life.

EDI is a mandatory squadmate during one of the final quests in the game, which sees Shepard raiding the headquarters of the Illusive Man, the leader of Cerberus. In it the player can learn that EDI is based on a rogue artificial intelligence that could be encountered by Shepard on the Moon in the first Mass Effect, along with some salvaged technology from Sovereign, a Reaper that appeared as the main antagonist of the first Mass Effect. During the game's ending sequence, if the player decides to choose the "destroy" ending in order to deal with the Reapers, it results in the death of all artificial intelligences, including EDI.

==== Mass Effect 3: Leviathan ====
During the Leviathan downloadable content for Mass Effect 3, Shepard attempts to locate the Reapers' creators, a mysterious ancient species known as the Leviathans. To do that, Shepard must seek for insights together with EDI in a laboratory that belonged to a investigator known as Dr. Bryson. EDI aids Shepard in analyzing the information available at the laboratory, with Shepard being able to return to analyze new data after each narrative break.

== Reception and analysis ==
=== Reception ===
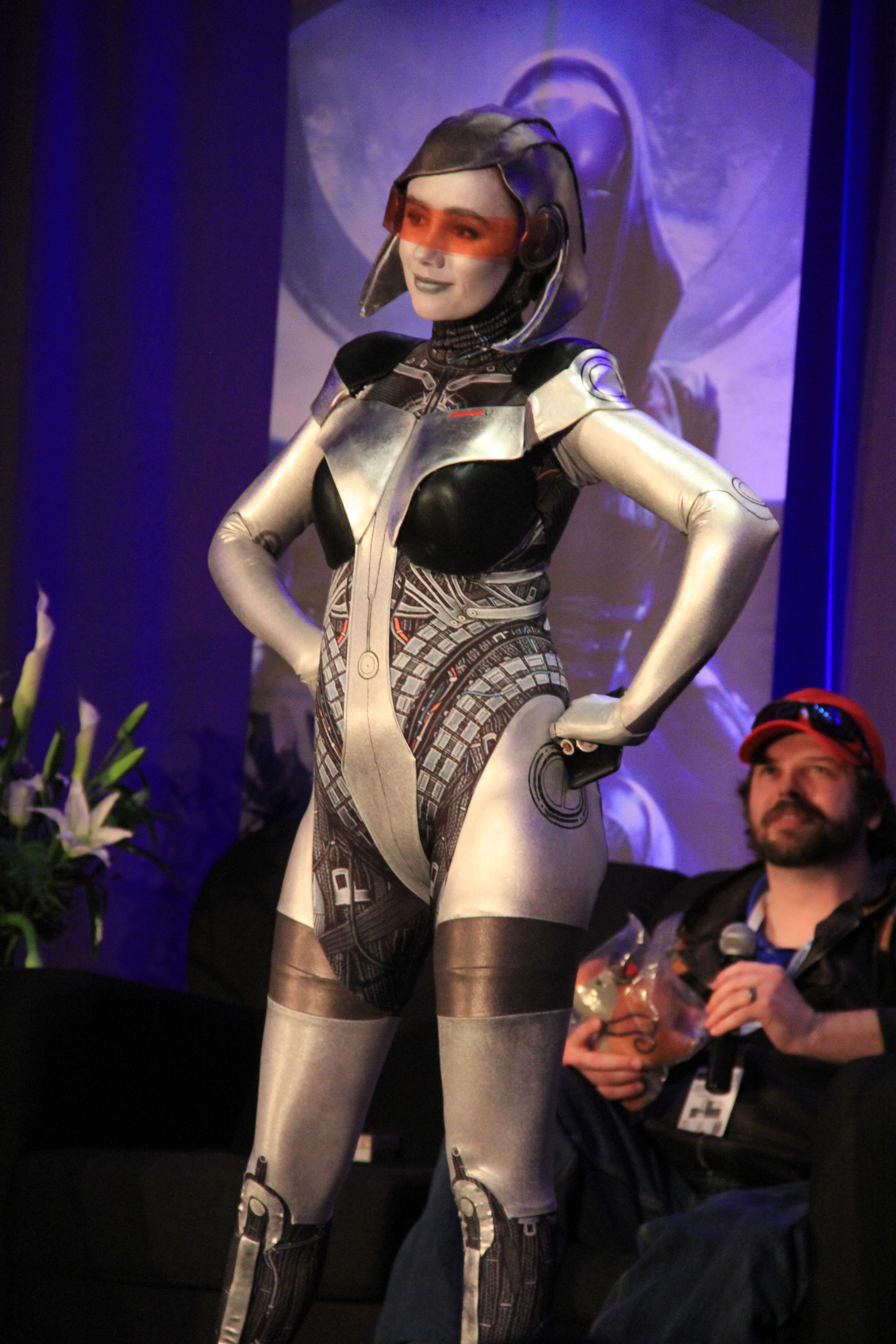
A Mass Effect fan at PAX South 2015, cosplaying as EDI

EDI has attained significant relevance in popular culture, becoming popular in the cosplay, fan art, and modding communities. Cosplayers have recreated EDI's robotic appearance in detail. Fans have also created life-sized papercraft models of the character. Her design has also inspired modders, including a mod for Resident Evil 3 Remake that replaces Jill Valentine's main outfit for one of EDI's costumes in Mass Effect 3. Taryn van der Byl of NAG highlighted the importance of the "probing Uranus" joke made by EDI in Mass Effect 2 when scanning the planet Uranus.

EDI's representation in Mass Effect 2 and Mass Effect 3, including her design and possible relationship with Joker, has been the subject of substantial commentary. In his ranking of the Mass Effect trilogy's best squadmates, Kenneth Shepard of Kotaku regarded EDI as "an incredible character" yet felt conflicted regarding her representation in the games. Shepard defined her attitude in Mass Effect 2 as "deadpan but witty", however, highlighting her as one of the best written, funny, and introspective characters in the series. Shepard underlined her attempts to learn what it means to be a person as "fascinating", stating, however, that this introspection was dampened by her story ending up tied to her relationship with Joker. Shepard further criticized this relationship, stating that it "feels uneven" as it shifted dramatically from Joker's excitement over a "sexy robot" to an examination of the depth of these two characters' feelings for one another. In his ranking written for PC Gamer, Wes Fenlon criticized EDI's design in Mass Effect 3 and her possible relationship with Joker, stating that EDI's role in representing what it meant to be human was already covered through Legion, making EDI's human form feel "gratuitous". GamesRadar+ included EDI in their list of "uncomfortably sexy AI characters", highlighting the relationship between EDI and Joker as "a little strange". Stacey Henley of The Gamer critisized EDI's alternate outfits in Mass Effect 3, stating that they were overly sexualized, leaning too much into the 'sexbot' trope, thus reducing EDI down to her body and making her an uncomfortable character that stopped players from experiencing her engaging, philosophical and layered characteristics. Henley compared this depiction of EDI to those of Miranda Lawson in Mass Effect 2 and Quiet in Metal Gear Solid. However, Henley was quite positive regarding EDI's characterization, praising her role in Mass Effect 2 and Mass Effect 3 and her relationship with Joker, even if she felt that this relationship was damaged by her overt sexualization. Connor Lindsay of Screen Rant theorised that EDI had been the one to attract the Collectors to the Normandy SR-2 to get Joker to lift her restrictions. Lindsay justified this theory because EDI never told Shepard that she had been the AI that they had destroyed on the Moon in the first Mass Effect.

Eric Huels, also writing for Screen Rant, discussed the possibility of EDI returning in the next Mass Effect, arguing that even if EDI dies in one of the potential endings of Mass Effect 3, she could have survived, as the Geth were supposedly also destroyed but have appeared prominently in teaser material for the next installment. Huels also stated that EDI, alongside the Geth, contradicted the Reapers' argument that organic and robotic beings could never coexist peacefully.

=== Analysis ===
Thomas Faller analyzed EDI's role within the Mass Effect universe, arguing that, unlike the Geth, who had harmed their creators and were at breach of one of Isaac Asimov's Three Laws of Robotics, EDI was not and could be categorized as a "supportive program". Faller further stated that EDI represented the actual intended use of artificial intelligence, which is "to serve and aid humanity". Faller also analyzed EDI's relationship with Joker.

EDI's role in her relationship with Joker has been the subject of substantial critical analysis. Dr Rudolf Thomas Inderst and Dr. Bettina Book of the IU International University of Applied Sciences, lexically and semantically analyzed EDI's dialogue through a specific excerpt of a conversation between EDI and Commander Shepard regarding her possible relationship with Joker in Mass Effect 3. They noted how EDI utilized specific terms and modes of conversation that "emphasized the technical and emotional distance between human and AI", noting how she interprets Shepard's statements literally and scientifically as demonstrated when EDI responds to Shepard's mention of chemistry by reducing an inherently human concept to its clinical equivalent. In their pragmatic analysis of the dialogue, they argued that EDI's communication in it was guided by an interest in understanding Joker's emotions, arguing that EDI's violation of Grice's maxims culturally reflects how identity and social understanding are constructed differently in artificial intelligences. Amanda Joyal examined the relationship between Joker and EDI, arguing that their progression from antagonism to intimacy reflects broader themes of Joker's cyborg identity.
