= D. C. Douglas =

American actor

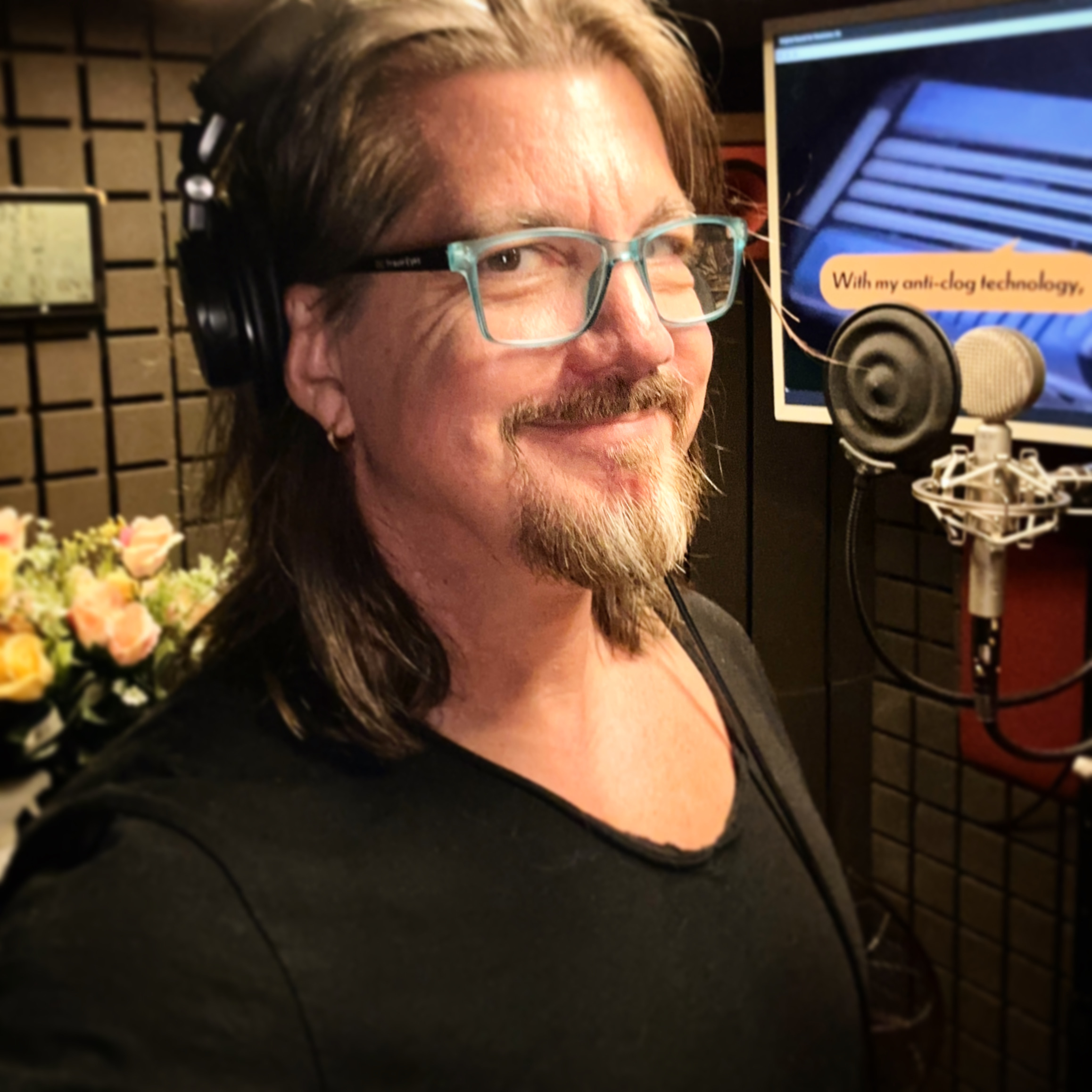
- Douglas in 2023
- Born: Berkeley, California, U.S.
- Occupation: Actor
- Years active: 1977–present
- Notable work: Mass Effect as Legion; Star Wars Jedi: Survivor as Rayvis; Transformers: Rescue Bots as Chase; Resident Evil as Albert Wesker; JoJo's Bizarre Adventure: Diamond Is Unbreakable as Yoshikage Kira
- Website: dcdouglas.com

D. C. Douglas is an American actor. He played Pa Kettle on Syfy's Z Nation and Zepht on Star Trek: Enterprise, and has appeared in several soap operas, including Days of Our Lives and The Young and the Restless. He voiced Albert Wesker in ten Resident Evil games, Legion in Mass Effect 2 and Mass Effect 3, and Yoshikage Kira in JoJo's Bizarre Adventure: Diamond Is Unbreakable (2016).

== Early life ==
Douglas was born in Berkeley, California. His father worked in sales and his mother is an artist, writer, and spiritual advisor. His maternal grandparents were vaudeville performers. After the decline of Vaudeville, his grandmother, Grace Hathaway, performed in burlesque and his grandfather, Joe Miller, became known in San Francisco for his talks at the Theosophy Lodge and weekly group walks through Golden Gate Park.

His parents divorced when he was five and Douglas was primarily raised by his mother in the San Francisco Bay Area from the 1970s to early 1980s. At age seven, he decided to become an actor after watching an episode of Hollywood and the Stars. He performed in community theatre in San Jose and Walnut Creek, and after getting his GED his Ygnacio Valley High School drama teacher encouraged him to pursue his acting dream.

At sixteen, Douglas traveled alone to New York to audition for Royal Academy of Dramatic Art -- the only US held auditions that year -- but was not accepted. Though his back-up plan was to live in New York, his visit dissuaded him from that idea. Instead, he moved to Los Angeles in 1985.

== Career ==
=== Live action ===
==== Theatre ====
Douglas graduated from the Estelle Harman Actors Workshop, the only accredited acting trade school in Los Angeles at the time. He co-founded the improvisation troupe Section Eight and was a member of Theatre of NOTE for several years. He produced Some Things You Need to Know Before the World Ends (A Final Evening with the Illuminati) at the Hollywood United Methodist Church, performing as Brother Lawrence opposite Theatre of NOTE co-founder Kevin Carr in a benefit for the AIDS Healthcare Foundation. The production was well received and became an LA Weekly "Pick-of-the-Week." Douglas performed in many other Equity Waiver 99-seat Theatre productions throughout the 1990s.

==== Television ====
Douglas' first network TV role was on the ABC sitcom Coach, but his three lines were cut in the final broadcast. In 1996, he landed a small role in Boston Common, an NBC pilot. When the show was picked up, he returned in a recurring role as DC, the antagonist to Hedy Burress's character. Douglas' television career involved primarily conservative or antagonist roles. Notable appearances include 24, Star Trek: Enterprise, NYPD Blue, ER, Charmed, Without a Trace, NCIS, Criminal Minds, Castle, and The Encounter.

In 2015, while pitching a film project to The Asylum that would pay homage to Resident Evil 5, a video game Douglas had worked on and gained fan appreciation for, the producers were inspired to cast him as Pa Kettle in Z Nation, a Syfy zombie series, for a three-episode arc.

Though never considered for a lead contract role on the Los Angeles-based soap operas, Douglas guest starred on all of them numerous times. Notable appearances include the manipulative Bellman in a 1991 Days of Our Lives honeymoon arc and two different characters on The Young and the Restless - Chad Atherton in a 1996 arc and Kurz, a crime boss taunting Tristan Rogers's character, in 2014. In 2017, Douglas made his 26th appearance on The Bold and the Beautiful over 20 years, playing his 6th role on the show.

In 2021, Douglas announced he was rebooting his acting career with a focus on independent cinema.

==== Film ====
Douglas' first film was 1989's Future Force with David Carradine. Though all his scenes were with Carradine, Douglas never met him as their characters only spoke through a futuristic video conference system.

Notable film roles include a possessed ghost hunter in Black Ops with Lance Henriksen, a disturbing turn as "Dad" in Smartass with Joey King, a deranged cop in Helen Alone with Priscilla Barnes, and a harried producer in Labor Pains with Lindsay Lohan.

In 2013, Douglas was cast as a serial killer in Apocalypse Kiss and altered his appearance to resemble Resident Evil villain Albert Wesker, as the producers were fans of his work in the video game franchise.

Douglas has worked with The Asylum since 2002, appearing in ten of their films. In 2015, while working on Alpha House, he bonded with the film's writers, Jacob Cooney and Brandon Trenz. Together, they developed the idea for Isle of the Dead, which Douglas pitched to The Asylum producers David Michael Latt, David Rimawi, and Paul Bales. The film was completed in 2016 with Douglas as Aiden Wexler opposite Joey Lawrence and Maryse Mizanin. It aired on the SyFy network.

Other notable The Asylum films include Titanic II as the ship captain, Sharknado 2 as Bud, one of the few characters to die by an alligator in a shark movie, and Aquarium of the Dead as the clueless aquarium tour guide. In 2021, Douglas was cast in three unrelated Lifetime Network films: The Killer in My Backyard, Killer Stepmom, and Drowning In Secrets.

==== Producer, writer, director ====
In 1996, Douglas wrote, produced, and starred in his first festival film short, Falling Words. He later wrote, produced, and directed The Eighth Plane, an anti-Scientology short, and Freud and Darwin Sitting in a Tree, about Lewis Henry Morgan. In 2001, he resurrected the character 'Lance Baxter' from Falling Words and created a cabaret act covering sad love songs that illustrated his dysfunctional relationships. It was performed at The Lava Lounge in Hollywood.

In 2006, inspired by turning forty, Douglas expanded the idea into Lance Baxter: Halfway Through My Life If I'm Lucky. The show featured original songs (lyrics by Douglas, music by Lily Popova) and comedic monologues. It was produced at The M Bar in Hollywood and ran for several nights as a fundraiser for More Than Shelter for Seniors.

Also in 2006, his film short Duck, Duck, Goose! played at film festivals worldwide and received Best Short awards from the Seattle's True Independent Film Festival (STIFF) and Trenton Film Festival.

His 2009 CGI short The Crooked Eye, starring Fay Masterson and narrated by Linda Hunt, played at festivals and won awards for Best Narration (STIFF), Best Screenplay (HDFest), and Best Animated Short (Red Rock Film Festival).

In 2016, he wrote, edited, and directed the Halloween animated short Ginger & Snapper with Rachael Leone, featuring voice actors Lacey Chabert, Steve Blum, Liam O'Brien, Laura Bailey, and Roger Craig Smith.

From 2007 to 2019, Douglas voiced Resident Evil villain Albert Wesker. As his fan following grew, he began producing fan service videos, with popular entries including anOld Spice spoof, 12 Days of Evil, and Covid-19: Albert F. Wesker Tips.

In 2017, Douglas created and launched MSM Breaking News!: Fake Trump Cartoons, an animated web series satirizing the Donald Trump presidency and the Robert Mueller investigation into Russian interference in the 2016 United States elections. A typical episode was written by Douglas and produced by his animator, Rachael Leone. Guest voice actors have included Steve Blum, Maurice LaMarche, Mary Elizabeth McGlynn, Todd Haberkorn and Mark Meer, among others.

=== Voiceover ===
==== Early voice-over career ====
Douglas began his voice acting career in the early 1990s by providing walla for low budget action and erotic films that were usually aired late night on Showtime. By the 21st century he had stopped doing general walla work altogether, but occasionally took on unique ADR jobs, including voice matching Guy Pearce in Factory Girl and Kevin Spacey in Fred Clause, as well as voicing a TV reporter in 50/50 and Brad Pitt's SpaceCom computer therapist in Ad Astra.

==== Video games ====
Douglas has voiced a variety of characters in video games, often being cast as low-voiced villains. Notable roles include The Master in the Buffy the Vampire Slayer video game, Albert Wesker in the Resident Evil series as well as Marvel vs. Capcom (9 games in total from 2007 - 2019), Raven in Tekken 6, AWACS Ghost Eye in Ace Combat 6: Fires of Liberation, Commandant Alexei in Tales of Vesperia, Legion in Mass Effect 2/Mass Effect 3/Mass Effect Legendary Edition, Grimoire Noir and Pod 042 in the Nier franchise, Azrael in BlazBlue: Chrono Phantasma, Coburn in Ubisoft's The Crew and Hector Birtwhistle (H.B.) in Xenoblade Chronicles X.

==== Commercials and promos ====
Douglas was a CBS Daytime promo announcer for the summer of 2003. He has cited that job as the turning point in his voiceover career, as he used the money from that contract to build his home studio, which was uncommon for voice artists at the time. Having a home studio allowed him to leave his editing job and work solely as an actor.

Douglas has lent his voice to several national ad campaigns, including the GEICO Celebrity campaign from 2006 to 2008, the McDonald's Be the Sizzle campaign from 2009 to 2010, Radio Shack's Holiday Hero campaign in 2010 and several Experian spots featuring Douglas and Tom Kenny as computers in 2014.

He has been one of the promo voices for Sony Pix since 2018.

==== Animation ====
Douglas' work in animation includes the role of Chase in Hub Network's Transformers: Rescue Bots (the longest-running Transformers series), Colonel Rawls (and many others) in Cartoon Network's Regular Show, Sylvus (the Elder) and Aikor (the Villain) in Monchichi Tribe, Newton in The Rocketeer, and a cameo in Family Guy as Superman.

==== Anime ====
Douglas initially avoided anime work in the early 2000s due to the low pay rates at the time. However, during his first convention appearance in 2010, he saw the growing interest from anime fans in meeting voice actors. Douglas has said the opportunity to travel while getting paid inspired him to seek out work at the Los Angeles production houses that recorded anime. This led to fan favorite roles such as Yoshikage Kira in the Diamond Is Unbreakable arc of JoJo's Bizarre Adventure, Wooden Sword Ryu in Netflix's Shaman King, Edo in Netflix's Ultraman, Praetorian in Netflix's Super Crooks, and X Drake in One Piece. He replaced Troy Baker as the new voice of the character Gin in the English dub of Case Closed.

== Politics ==
In April 2010, Douglas faced criticism from the Tea Party movement for a phone call he made to Freedomworks in which he left an inflammatory voice mail. A day later, GEICO removed him from a series of internet commercials that were in post-production. This led to some debate in the voice-over community about whether announcers were public figures. Douglas responded by producing a satirical Tea Party PSA for YouTube that was subsequently broadcast on both Joy Behar's HLN show and Geraldo Rivera's Geraldo at Large with Douglas as a guest.

The experience inspired Douglas to continue creating short, satirical political videos. Two of his most viewed videos were his Burn a Koran Day video (posted by The Huffington Post) and his Why #OccupyWallStreet? video (aired on MSNBC's The Last Word with Lawrence O'Donnell).

In November 2011, Douglas tweeted a quote from Brett Ratner at a Tower Heist Q&A that included a disparaging remark about homosexuals. The Hollywood Reporter subsequently reported Douglas' tweet as the beginning of a controversy which led to Ratner resigning from his role as producer of the 2012 Academy Awards.

== Filmography ==
=== Live-action ===
Film credits
Year	Title	Role	Notes
1989	Future Force	Billy	
1995	Under Siege 2: Dark Territory	Technician #1	
1997	Falling Words	Lance	Short film
1998	The Eighth Plane	Henry	Short film
1998	Two Weeks Later	Solomon	Short film
1998	Just Add Water	Barry	Short film
2000	Freud and Darwin Sitting in a Tree	Charlie	Short film
2001	Totally Blonde	French Waiter, Douglas The Hotel Clerk	
2002	Killer 2: The Beast	Dr. W. B. Miller	Direct-to-video
2003	Grace	Nate	Short film
2003	Side Show	Sleazy Producer	Short film
2003	Scarecrow Slayer	Dr. Baxter	Direct-to-video
2003	The Commission	Assistant Counsel Howard P. Willens	
2003	Ga-Ga	Calio	Short film
2003	Billy Makes the Cut	Sal	Short film
2004	Tae Guk Gi: The Brotherhood of War	Additional Voices	English dub
2004	Streakers	Jack	Short film
2004	Billy's Dad Is a Fudge-Packer!	Narrator	Short film
2005	Duck, Duck, Goose!	Jacob	Short film
2005	5.6 Seconds	Radio Announcer	Short film
2006	New York Waiting	Exion	
2006	666: The Child	Dr. Loring	
2007	Sister's Keeper	Richard Stander	
2007	Universal Remote	The Narrator, The Navy Suit	
2008	Bling	Nathan	Short film
2008	Deadwater	Larry Grubman	Direct-to-video
2008	Shelter	Luke Greenley	
2009	The Crooked Eye	Frank	Short film
2009	Poker Run	Amarillo Slim	
2009	Labor Pains	Vista Producer	
2010	Titanic II	Captain Howard	Direct-to-video
2010	Change Your Life!	Randy Reynolds	Direct-to-video
2012	...Or Die	D.C.	Short film
2014	Alpha House	Marshall	Direct-to-video
2014	Helen Alone	Mark's Dad, Announcer	
2014	Apocalypse Kiss	Adrian	
2016	KILD TV	Milton Web / Dr. Perseco	
2016	The Shickles	Barry	
2016	Ribbons	Frank Greenlee	
2016	Isle of the Dead	Colonel Aiden Wexler	
2017	Smartass	Dad	
2018	The Hard Scene	Mark	Short film
2021	Aquarium of the Dead	Daniel	
2021	The Killer in My Backyard	Ron	
2021	Killer Stepmom	Randy	
2021	Debt Valley	Leonard Mason	Short film
2022	Drowning In Secrets	Caleb	
2022	Cuddly Toys	Reverend Maxwell	

Television credits
Year	Title	Role	Notes
1988	Al TV	Reginald Buttplug, Fashion Designer	Episode: "Even Worse"
1991	Coach	Dulcimer Freak	Episode: "Leonard Kraleman: All-American"
1991	General Hospital	Sidney	1 episode
1991–2014	Days of Our Lives	Bellman, Brad, Mr. Bob Salke	4 episodes
1992	Civil Wars	Ernie	Episode: "His Honor Offer"
1992	Renegade	Father Nelson	Episode: "Eye of the Storm"
1994	Melrose Place	Dweeby Executive	Episode: "And Justice for All"
1995	Hudson Street	Kid	Episode: "Contempt"
1996–1997	Boston Common	Ben, DC	10 episodes
1996–2014	The Young and the Restless	Chad Atherton, Cohort, Kurtz	13 episodes
1997	Claude's Crib	Snobbish Waiter	Episode: "Clothes Encounter"
1997	Diagnosis: Murder	Randy Thompson	Episode: "Murder in the Air"
1997–2017	The Bold and the Beautiful	Court Clerk, Chip, Dr. Whittman, Minister, Dr. Andrews	26 episodes
1998	Beverly Hills, 90210	Mr. Remington	Episode: "The Girl Who Cried Wolf"
1998	Beyond Belief: Fact or Fiction	Wally	Episode: "Scoop"
1998	Silk Stalkings	Ferret	Episode: "Forever"
1998	Emma's Wish	Carney	Television film
1999	King's Pawn	Clark	Television film
2001	Charmed	Craig	Episode: "Bride and Groom"
2002	That '80s Show	Customer	Episode: "Tuesday Comes Over"
2002	ER	Ken Ambrose	Episode: "Dead Again"
2003	Mister Sterling	Danny	Episode: "Statewide Swing"
2003	Star Trek: Enterprise	Zepth	Episode: "The Breach"
2003	JAG	Dr. Alan Ganzel	Episode: "Pas de Deux"
2004	NYPD Blue	Dr. Ted Hollingsworth	Episode: "What's Your Poison"
2005	Las Vegas	Barnett	Episode: "One Nation, Under Surveillance"
2005	The Inside	Ned Batter	Episode: "Old Wounds"
2005	Strong Medicine	Agent Norton	Episode: "New Blood"
2006	The Suite Life of Zack & Cody	Snooty Interviewer	Episode: "Books and Birdhouses"
2006–2007	What About Brian	Gary Barnes	2 episodes
2007	24	Blake Simon	Episode: "Day 6: 6:00 a.m.-7:00 a.m."
2007	Passions	Dr. Kirkwood	3 episodes
2007	Final Approach	Doug Ellis	Television film
2008	Without a Trace	Charlie Reed	Episode: "A Bend in the Road"
2009	Three Rivers	Dr. Ralston	Episode: "Place of Life"
2010	Criminal Minds	Mr. Krouse	Episode: "Risky Business"
2011	Raising Hope	Man in Suit	Episode: "It's a Hopeful Life"
2012	Castle	Bill Moss	Episode: "Dial M for Mayor"
2012	Bucket & Skinner's Epic Adventures	Blake's Dad	Episode: "Epic Cuffs"
2012	Hot in Cleveland	Peter Filsinger	Episode: "Rubber Ball"
2012	2 Broke Girls	Conrad Dean	Episode: "And the Drug Money"
2012	NCIS: Los Angeles	Rob Nelson	Episode: "Neighborhood Watch"
2012	Workaholics	Tattoo Artist	Episode: "True Dromance"
2012	Franklin & Bash	Wooten	Episode: "Strange Brew"
2012	Sullivan & Son	HR Guy	Episode: "Hank Speech"
2013	Dog with a Blog	Rick Stewart	Episode: "Stan's Old Owner"
2013	Kickin' It	Chuck Crawford	Episode: "Fawlty Temple"
2014	NCIS	Tom Speakman	Episode: "Crescent City: Part 1"
2014	Sharknado 2: The Second One	Bud	Television film
2015	The Haunted Hathaways	Oliver Loomis	Episode: "Haunted Ghost Tour"
2015–2016	Z Nation	Pa Kettle	3 episodes
2019–2019	Wizard School Dropout	Professor Grundlesnoot	5 episodes
2020	The Encounter	Lewis	Episode: "Delivery"
2022	CSI: Vegas	Rob Carson	Episode: "The Painted Man"

=== Voice-over ===
Anime credits
Year	Title	Role	Notes
2000–2001	Hajime no Ippo	Genji Kamogawa, Kazuki Sanada	Also Champion Road
2009–2011	One Piece	X Drake	
2014–2015	Naruto: Shippuden	Gari, Ittan	
2015	JoJo's Bizarre Adventure: Stardust Crusaders: Battle in Egypt	Doctor	
2015–2016	Durarara!! x2	Additional Voices	
2016	Erased	Kitamura	Ep. "Future"
2017	Cyborg 009: Call of Justice	Steven Archimedes	
2017	Berserk	Locus, Priest	
2017	Mobile Suit Gundam: Thunderbolt	Vincent Pike, Nelson	
2017–2018	Mobile Suit Gundam: Iron-Blooded Orphans	Jasley Donomikols	
2018–2019	Hunter × Hunter	Shoot McMahon	
2018	Record of Grancrest War	Dimitrie	Ep. "Forest of Eternal Darkness"
2018	Sword Art Online Alternative Gun Gale Online	Narrator	Ep. "Squad Jam"
2018	The Laws of the Universe	Alpha	
2018	Back Street Girls: Gokudolls	Ryo	
2018	Sirius the Jaeger	Kershner	
2018–present	Baki	Igari, Commander	Netflix ONA
2019	JoJo's Bizarre Adventure: Diamond Is Unbreakable	Yoshikage Kira, Kosaku Kawajiri	
2019	Ultraman	Edo, Nepenthus	Netflix ONA
2019	Neon Genesis Evangelion	Keel Lorenz	Netflix dub
2019	Cells at Work!	Basophil	
2019	Boruto: Naruto Next Generations	Gekko	
2019	One Piece: Stampede	X Drake	
2020	Welcome to Demon School! Iruma-kun	Callego Naberius	
2020	Akudama Drive	Master	Funimation dub
2021	Hortensia Saga	Maurice Baudelaire	Funimation dub
2021	Shaman King	Ryunosuke "Ryu" Umemiya	Netflix dub
2021	Super Crooks	Praetorian	Netflix dub
2022	Bastard!! Heavy Metal, Dark Fantasy	Geo Noto Soto	Netflix dub
2023	The Legend of Heroes: Trails of Cold Steel – Northern War	Rufus Albarea	Crunchyroll dub
2023	Nier: Automata Ver1.1a	Pod 042	

Animation credits
Year	Title	Role	Notes
2009, 2011	Family Guy	Imperial Officer #3, Superman	
2010	The American Dream	Various	Television special
2011–2016	Transformers: Rescue Bots	Chase, Mr. Harrison, Additional Voices	
2016–2017	Regular Show	Colonel Rawls, Additional Voices	
2020	Homeward	Rolf	
2020	DC Super Hero Girls	Deathstroke	
2020	The Rocketeer	Newton / Gus	
2021	FriendZSpace	BotDog	
2024	WondLa	Omnipod	
2024	What If...?	The Incarnate	3 episodes
2026	Beavis and Butt-Head	Beavis' real voice	Episode: "Bold New Voice"

Film ADR credits
Year	Title	Role	Notes
2011	50/50	Live Volcano Reporter	Uncredited
2017	Death Race 2050	A.B.E.	Uncredited; Direct-to-video
2019	Ad Astra	Computer Therapist	Uncredited

Video game credits
Year	Title	Role	Notes
2002	Buffy the Vampire Slayer	The Master	
2004	SpellForce: The Breath of Winter	Uzakhan, Shamziro, Bario, Blind Monk, Desperate Soul	
2005	Tekken 5	Various	
2006	SpellForce 2: Shadow Wars	Avatar, Malacay	
2006	Xenosaga Episode III: Also sprach Zarathustra	Suou Uzuki, Voyager	
2006	.hack//G.U. vol.1//Rebirth	Gabi, Taihaku	
2007	.hack//G.U. vol.2//Reminisce	Gabi, Taihaku	
2007	.hack//G.U. vol.3//Redemption	Gabi, Taihaku	
2007	Eternal Sonata	Jazz	
2007	Ace Combat 6: Fires of Liberation	AWACS Ghost Eye	
2007	Resident Evil: The Umbrella Chronicles	Albert Wesker	
2008	Soulcalibur IV	Male Voice 5	
2008	Tales of Vesperia	Alexei	
2009	Resident Evil 5	Albert Wesker	
2009	Tekken 6	Raven	
2009	Resident Evil: The Darkside Chronicles	Albert Wesker	
2010	Mass Effect 2	Legion, Crewman Hawthorne	
2010	Nier	Grimoire Noir	
2011	Marvel vs. Capcom 3: Fate of Two Worlds	Albert Wesker	
2011	MotorStorm: Apocalypse	Dusklite Site Manager	
2011	Resident Evil: The Mercenaries 3D	Albert Wesker	
2011	Tekken Tag Tournament 2	Raven	
2011	Ultimate Marvel vs. Capcom 3	Albert Wesker	
2011	Star Wars: The Old Republic	Various	
2012	Mass Effect 3	Legion, Tactus, Geth Elder, Legion Assassin, Geth VI	
2012	Street Fighter X Tekken	Raven, Eddy Gordo	
2012	Rise of Dragonian Era Online	Narrator	
2012	Tales of Graces f	President Dylan Paradine	
2012	Starhawk	Rifters, Outcasts, Radio Control Operators	
2013	NBA 2K14	Uber Agent	
2013	Rune Factory 4	Dylas, Bado	
2013	Dark Matter	AI	
2014	BlazBlue: Chrono Phantasma	Azrael	
2014	ZMR Zombie Monster Robots	Mech	
2014	The Crew	Coburn	
2015	Resident Evil: Revelations 2	Albert Wesker	
2015	Lego Jurassic World	Additional Voices	
2015	Lost Dimension	George Jackman	
2015	Persona 4: Dancing All Night	Dance Instructor	
2015	Xenoblade Chronicles X	H.B.	
2015	The Legend of Heroes: Trails of Cold Steel	Rufus Albarea, Valimar	
2016	Resident Evil Zero HD Remaster	Albert Wesker	
2016	Fire Emblem Fates	Gunter	
2016	Space Run Galaxy	Simon	
2016	Umbrella Corps	Albert Wesker, Player	
2016	Lego Star Wars: The Force Awakens	2Med2	
2016	Zero Time Dilemma	Zero	
2016	God Eater 2: Rage Burst	Odin	
2016	The Legend of Heroes: Trails of Cold Steel II	Rufus Albarea, Valimar	
2016	Shin Megami Tensei IV: Apocalypse	Odin	
2016	Exist Archive	Yamatoga	
2016	Tyranny	Sage Lantry	
2017	Fire Emblem Heroes	Wrys, Barst, Gunter	
2017	Robo Recall	Odin, Service Bots, Thug Bots	
2017	Nier: Automata	Pod 042	
2017	Persona 5	Suguru Kamoshida	
2018	Monster Hunter: World	Analytics Director	
2018	Radiant Historia: Perfect Chronology	Gafka	
2018	BlazBlue: Cross Tag Battle	Azrael	
2018	Valkyria Chronicles 4	Jester Mooney	
2018	Soulcalibur VI	Pod 042	
2019	Ace Combat 7: Skies Unknown	Schroeder	
2019	Dead or Alive 6	Diego	
2019	Sekiro: Shadows Die Twice	Narrator, Merchant	
2019	Teppen	Albert Wesker	
2019	AI: The Somnium Files	#89	
2019	Code Vein	Gregorio Silva, Anti	
2019	The Legend of Heroes: Trails of Cold Steel III	Rufus Albarea, Valimar	
2019	Shenmue III	Additional Cast	
2019	Borderlands 3	Burton Briggs	
2019	YIIK: A Postmodern RPG	Golden Alpaca, God of Hope	
2020	Space Channel 5 VR: Kinda Funky News Flash!		
2020	Persona 5 Royal	Suguru Kamoshida	
2020	The Legend of Heroes: Trails of Cold Steel IV	Rufus Albarea, Valimar	
2021	Nier Replicant ver.1.22474487139...	Grimoire Noir	
2023	Octopath Traveler II	Father	
2023	Honkai: Star Rail	Svarog	
2023	Star Wars Jedi: Survivor	Rayvis	
2023	The Legend of Heroes: Trails into Reverie	Rufus Albarea, Valimar	
2023	Armored Core VI: Fires of Rubicon	G1 Michigan, additional voices	
2024	Tekken 8	Raven	
2024	Unicorn Overlord	Jeremy	
2025	The Legend of Heroes: Trails Through Daybreak II	Rufus Albarea	
2026	The Legend of Heroes: Trails Beyond the Horizon	Rufus Albarea	
2026	Star Wars: Zero Company	M-3V0	

== See also ==
- Gilbert Gottfried — actor fired as voice of Aflac Duck in 2011 for jokes about the 2011 Tōhoku earthquake and tsunami
