= Legion (Mass Effect) =

Fictional character from Mass Effect

Legion Geth Platform 2A93
- Mass Effect character
- Legion's design as presented in The Art of the Mass Effect Universe.
- First appearance: Mass Effect 2 (2010)
- Last appearance: Mass Effect 3 (2012)
- Voiced by: D. C. Douglas

In-universe information
- Alias: Legion
- Race: Geth
- Class: Infiltrator
- Skill: Sniper Rifles; Technology

Legion is a character in BioWare's Mass Effect franchise. The character first appears in Mass Effect 2 as a party member (or "squadmate"). After Mass Effect 2, Legion returns in Mass Effect 3 as a supporting non-player character. Legion is voiced by American actor D. C. Douglas.

"Legion" is a name given by The Normandy SR-2's artificial intelligence, EDI, to Geth Platform 2A93, a robot unit inhabited by the gestalt consciousness formed from a host of networked artificial intelligence entities known as the geth. The philosophical basis EDI relies on is the biblical story about the demonic entities from the exorcism of the Gerasene demoniac, which alludes to the multitude of geth runtime programs housed within the mobile platform and the emergence of a swarm intelligence system which consists of these programs interacting locally with one another and with their environment. Legion is designed to operate outside of geth space in a diplomatic manner, and develops a fascination for series protagonist Commander Shepard.

Legion is a popular and recognizable character, having earned numerous placements in "top character" lists. The character's physical appearance and valediction "does this unit have a soul?" has attained wider recognition in popular culture. Commentators have referenced Legion and the geth in their discussions about artificial intelligence in fiction. Legion is also featured in various official and unofficial Mass Effect merchandise.

== Character overview ==
Within the lore of the Mass Effect franchise, the geth are a collective of AI (artificial intelligence) beings which do not have the concept of individuality, and think in terms of the entire consensus. The geth were originally created by the quarians, a species of humanoid extraterrestrials known for their skills with technology and synthetic intelligence, to be "servants of the people" centuries before the events of the Mass Effect series. A single geth program has enough processing power for its motor functions and sensory input, and is essentially a simple software program housed within "mobile platforms" made from flexible synthetic material. When more than one geth are brought together, they can network their processing power; while not quite a hive mind, the geth are capabe of forming a system which consists of the coordination of multiple simple programs akin to swarm robotics, freeing up cycles for more advanced forms of reasoning, and making the individual geth capable of more complicated tasks.

Following the geth's ubiquitous integration within quarian society, repeated interaction with their creators suggested to the geth a template for collective behaviour, and their network gradually developed the capacity for self-awareness. Fearing the geth's unexpected intellectual development, the quarians attempted to destroy their creations. This led to an uprising from the geth, and a protracted war began between the two biological and technological races, which ultimately ended with the geth seizing control of the quarian homeworld Rannoch and the exile of the surviving quarians.

"Legion has an ideology all his own and, for me, he's the best-developed character in the story, which is a quirky paradox seeing that, as a machine, he's meant to have no character. But he does somehow, right? Why did he choose to attach Shepard's armor to his frame? Because there was a hole."

— Nick Clifford, Mass Effect Assistant product manager

A collective consciousness formed from 1,183 geth programs, Legion's unit is eleven times more powerful than standard geth mobile platforms as it is meant to contain a host number of "core Geth intelligences" in a single mobile unit. In terms of appearance, Legion looks much like other geth units, but is far more advanced and capable of independent thought. Designed to interact diplomatically with organic lifeforms, Legion develops a unique fascination with Shepard, whom he refers to as "Shepard-Commander". (Note: Although the geth do not have any concept of gender as a synthetic species, several commentators cited in this article have referred to Legion by the masculine pronoun.)

Legion is the first representative from the "true geth" consensus encountered by the player in the role of series protagonist Commander Shepard for the original Mass Effect trilogy. The "true geth" represents a majority of the geth consensus that refused to follow Saren Arterius and the Reapers to war with all other sentient life in the first Mass Effect, whose geth enemies are revealed in the sequel as members of a splinter heretic faction who worshiped the Reaper Sovereign. Legion's backstory involves him retracing the worlds Shepard had visited in the first Mass Effect, searching for the human who managed to defeat Sovereign and the geth heretic faction. Legion eventually found the SSV Normandy's wreckage on the planet Alchera and learned of Shepard's death, but kept a piece of the Commander's torn off N7 armor and attached it to cover the battle damage in his chest.

== Concept and design ==
The design team's initial approach to Legion's concept was to distinguish him from other geth. Numerous sketches of Legion with various different head shapes or two or more glowing photo-receptors in lieu of a single bright "flashlight head" were considered but ultimately not chosen as the team changed creative direction and decided to apply a more restrained approach. Legion's final design incorporates a ripped off section of Shepard's armor from the first game. According to Mass Effect 3's audio lead Rob Blake, the process of morphing the spoken dialogue by Legion's actor D.C. Douglas into the desired voice for the character was "arduous", as he wanted to retain the signature granular, "clicky" sound effects of a typical geth unit without compromising the intonation of the actor's performance.

The geth were intended to be sidelined after the first Mass Effect, and Legion was not originally supposed to be made a squad member for its sequel. However, overall fan response to the geth was positive, so their role was expanded for the remainder of the original trilogy through Legion. This had the side effect of lessening focus on other minor plot lines, including that of the insectoid rachni. BioWare employees Patrick Weekes and Sylvia Feketekuty wrote Legion for Mass Effect 3. Weekes noted that the development team liked the idea of the geth intelligence being one that forms by consensus and increases exponentially when they are greater in number, as they wanted to develop something that is distinct from standard organic intelligence as well as typical artificial intelligence or robot tropes in fiction, which are often functionally similar to the notion of how human beings operate intellectually. According to Feketekuty, Legion could connect back to the other clusters of geth consensus at will, though the gestalt intelligence contained with its platform is ultimately an "anonymous collective going out on its own" and is capable of operating under "the equivalent of offline mode". Unlike EDI, another AI companion, Legion is depicted as lacking the concept of a sense of humor.

== Appearances ==
=== Mass Effect 2 ===
Legion was first seen in the inaugural teaser trailer for Mass Effect 2, and was later fully revealed in the "Mass Effect 2 Enemies" trailer; BioWare released both trailers in February 2009 and November 2009 respectively. In Mass Effect 2, Legion is presented as an unidentified geth unit who assists Shepard's squad from attacking husks with a sniper rifle on board a derelict Reaper, though he is disabled by a husk while opening the way for the squad to reach the ship's core. Shepard decides to take the disabled geth back to the Normandy at the conclusion of the mission. The geth unit can be sold to Cerberus for research, or kept stored under guard in the AI Core of the Normandy. If reactivated for Shepard to interrogate, he identifies and accepts EDI's analogy of his nature to the biblical story of the exorcism of the Gerasene demoniac in the Gospel of Mark 5:9. While Legion agrees to join the suicide mission against the Collectors, Shepard must gain Legion's loyalty by traveling to a heretic geth station and either choose to destroy all heretic geth or to reprogram their own mind-altering virus so that they will rejoin the "true geth". Following the mission's completion, Legion becomes loyal to Shepard and reveals that the heretic faction decided to help Sovereign in the original Mass Effect in return for a Reaper body that all geth could upload themselves into, and join into a single consciousness. The "true geth" consensus declined to advance Sovereign's agenda and believe that all life have a right to self-determination; Legion reveals that the geth intend to do this by building a megastructure, an enormous self-supporting artificial construct similar to a dyson sphere, which could house every single geth program. If Shepard asks Legion why he repaired himself from damage sustained on Eden Prime with pieces of Shepard's old N7 armour from the Normandy's crash site, Legion becomes evasive in his replies.

=== Mass Effect 3 ===
Legion returns in Mass Effect 3 if he survived the suicide mission from the previous game. After defeating the Collectors, Legion returned to the Geth Consensus in the Perseus Veil. Regardless of whether the heretics were rewritten or destroyed, the quarians, in an attempt to retake Rannoch, their homeworld, attacked first. They destroyed the proposed geth megastructure, which was still under construction and had a significant number of geth programs already installed. With their intelligence dimmed and survival taking precedence among the geth, they choose to make a deal with the Reapers, allowing themselves to be controlled with Reaper code to grant them greater intelligence and fighting ability, believing the cost of their free will an acceptable price to avoid extinction. Legion is then captured by the heretics, who used him to broadcast the Reaper signal to all geth from a dreadnought, even to those beyond the Veil. Shepard rescues Legion, who assists Shepard by using an improved interface for the interaction between organic and synthetic lifeforms, which allows Shepard to enter the geth collective and sever their connection to the Reapers, throwing their fleet into disarray.

Prior to attacking the geth base on Rannoch, Legion reveals that the Reaper code is contained within his platform. After assisting Shepard in destroying the Reaper leading the attack on the Rannoch, Legion attempts to upload the Reaper upgrades to the geth to give them true intelligence and consciousness, but with free will. The code is incomplete, forcing Legion to upload and disperse his own code throughout the collective, effectively deactivating the gestalt consciousness residing within the platform. Shepard will have to choose between allowing Legion to upload the code and allow the geth to wipe out the quarians, or stopping Legion and allow the quarians to wipe out the geth. Alternatively, if multiple conditions are met in both Mass Effect 2 and Mass Effect 3 depending on the player's choices, Shepard and Tali could convince the quarians that the geth do not seek to harm them and to break off their attack. If the player passes this milestone, Legion's geth programs are transferred from the platform to the geth mothership, ensuring the geth consensus has attained free will; their first act is to reinforce the quarians' immune systems by reprogramming their suits. Legion, in his final moments, refers to himself as "I" and not "we", signifying that he has become a true individual rather than a gestalt intellect. Tali tells Legion that the answer to the question the geth asked centuries ago, if they had souls, was "yes". Regardless of how the situation between the quarians and the geth is resolved, Legion's name is engraved on the memorial wall on the Normandy.

If a new game is started for Mass Effect 3 or if the player imports a saved game where Legion cannot appear in Mass Effect 3, Legion's role in the narrative will be replaced by a "Geth VI" constructed in Legion's likeness, with the non-standard elements like the section of N7 armor and the hole in the platform's torso recreated via hologram. It has no memory of the events after Saren's attack on Eden Prime, and it will not be possible for the player to broker a ceasefire between the geth and the quarians. If the player imports a saved game where Legion was given to Cerberus in Mass Effect 2, he will appear as an enemy unit when Shepard raids the Cerberus Cronos Station in Mass Effect 3.

== Merchandise ==
Legion has been subject to licensed merchandise. In 2015, Hong Kong-based designer figure producer ThreeZero released a 13-inch tall action figure of the character; it is covered in a "suit" of PVC to mimic the character's body of wiring and to cover the figure's joints. In 2021, the official BioWare online store offered a Legion canvas print stretched over a wooden frame for purchase. All 500 pieces of the limited edition artwork by artist Ben Huen have since been sold out, with shipments due for the second half of 2021 in two waves.

== Cultural impact ==
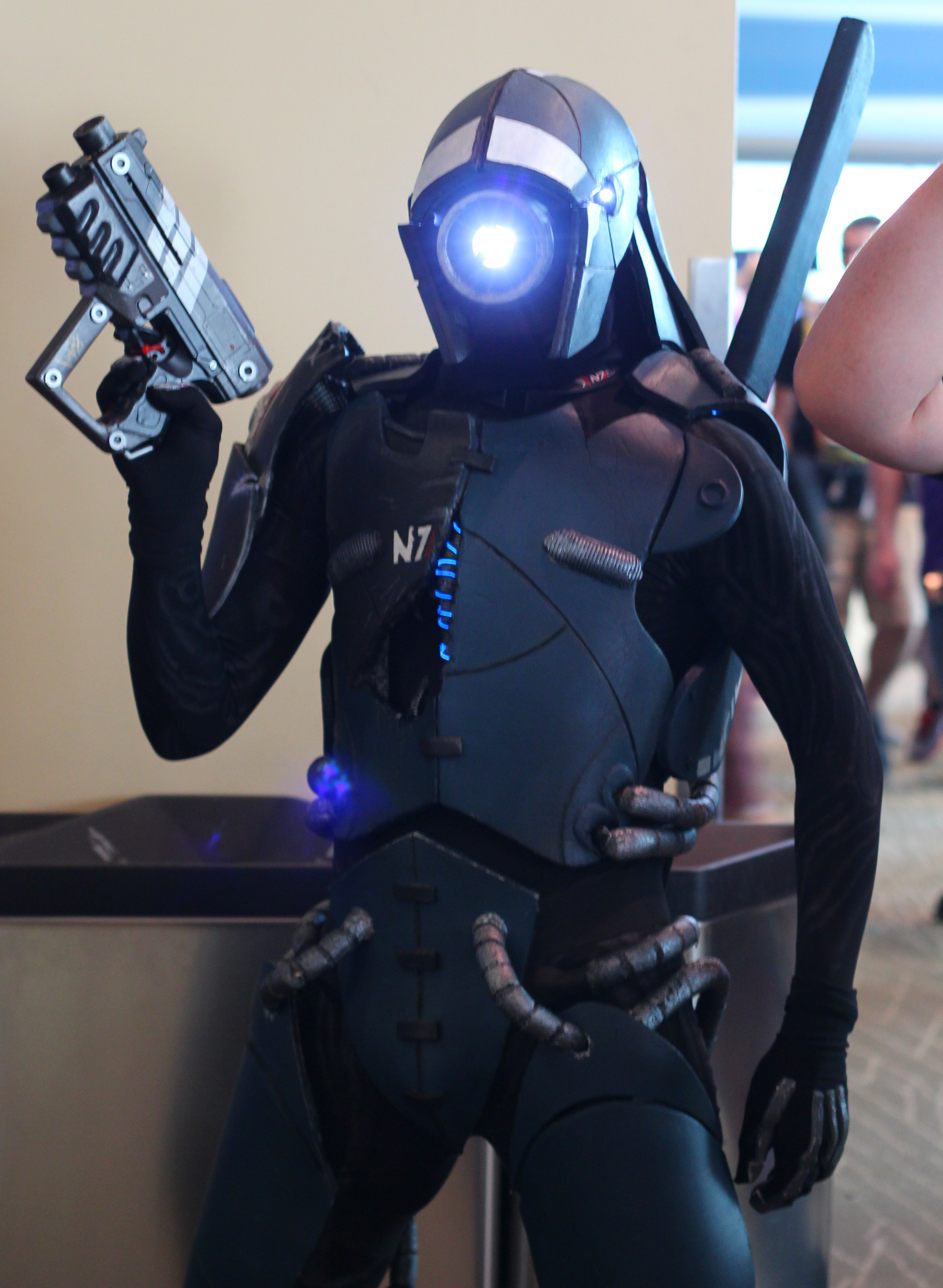
A fan dressed as Legion at PAX Prime 2013

Legion has attained wider recognition in popular culture, and continues to be referenced in various media after the conclusion of the original trilogy. Legion was one of the most voted characters according to the results of a reader's poll published by IGN in December 2014 for their top ultimate RPG party choices. Legion's parting question, "Does this unit have a soul?" was selected by Gamesradar as one of the best video game quotes of all time. Legion's quote is referenced by Amazon's Echo device as of 2017. BioWare acknowledged the Amazon Echo easter egg and responded with a pop culture reference of their own. In early 2018, some media outlets drew attention to the many visual similarities between the reimagining of the 1965 series Lost in Space and the Mass Effect franchise, particular the appearance of the redesigned Robot character. In a February 2019 article written for Comicbook.com, Liana Ruppert noted the trending number of Apex Legends players requesting for a Mass Effect Legion skin for the Pathfinder character.

=== Critical reception ===
Legion has been generally well received, with appearances in multiple "top" character lists by critics. GamesRadar considered Legion one of the best new characters of 2010, praising his "clinical and decidedly mechanical delivery" and intriguing dialogue. Casey Lynch from IGN believed Legion to have one of gaming's best "first encounters" with a character, which is accentuated by his musical theme and its "rousing crescendo". Steven Hopper of IGN was excited to see how Legion would develop in the then-upcoming Mass Effect 3 and calling his recruitment "an awesome twist". GamesRadar's Jordan Baughman cited Legion as an example of BioWare's "Kickass Robot" character archetype, following on from Knights of the Old Republic's HK-47 and Dragon Age's Shale.

Chris Livingstone from PC Gamer thought highly of Legion and called him "an interesting character" in spite of the presence of what Livingstone considers to be cliched science fiction tropes surrounding the character within the series narrative. He emphasized that Legion's decision to co-opt a piece of Shepard's armor as a crude form of self-repair is an intriguing notion that he is capable of sentimentality. He also noted that even though the character lacks a sense of humor as a character trait, "he is often funny in that way robots have of flatly presenting data" within certain situations, and was saddened by his eventual demise in Mass Effect 3.

=== Analysis ===
The depictions of Legion and the geth have been analyzed by multiple sources. Eric Emin Wood from ITBusiness.ca explained the nature of the geth through the following example: "imagine the Geth mothership as a cloud server, each Geth unit as a computer, and each Geth as a file". In his essay "We Are Legion: Artificial Intelligence in BioWare's Mass Effect", Thomas Faller compared the geth narrative of becoming self-conscious about its situation to René Descartes' philosophical proposition cogito, ergo sum and the right to be accepted as individual. He notes that the Mass Effect universe "does not only provide us with classical themes such as a distinct breach of Asimov's 'Three Laws of Robotics,' but also gives us the opportunity to experience those issues in a more immersive way". The authors of the 2017 book Ten Things Video Games Can Teach Us: (about life, philosophy and everything), discussed the nature of Legion and the geth, and specifically whether the manner in which their intelligence is manifested fits into American philosopher Hilary Putnam's theory of functionalism. Dutch theologian Frank Bosman noted that the biblical origins of Legion's name is an example of the numerous explicit references to Christian tradition in Mass Effect.

In his criticism of a 2018 presentation by AI developer Hanson Robotics, Wood said Mass Effect presents a more persuasive argument by comparison, that an AI entity which reaches a certain developmental milestone intellectually is essentially a new form of life. Wood cited Legion and the geth as exemplifying the notion that "any groundbreaking creation will be accompanied by consequences both good and bad, and which it will be is often outside its creators' control".
