= Mako (Mass Effect) =

Fictional vehicle from Mass Effect game series

- Mass Effect vehicle
- Concept art of the Mako as presented in the Art of the Mass Effect Universe.
- First appearance: Mass Effect (2007)
- Last appearance: Mass Effect: Paragon Lost (2012)

Information
- Affiliation: Systems Alliance

General characteristics
- Class: Infantry fighting vehicle
- Armaments: Turreted 155mm mass accelerator and coaxially-mounted machine gun
- Population volume: 1 driver/gunner 8 passengers

The M35 Mako is a fictional infantry fighting vehicle that appears in the Mass Effect video game franchise. A six-wheeled tank / utility vehicle, it appears in the original Mass Effect as a drivable transport vehicle which is also capable of providing combat support. The Mako was originally intended for inclusion in Mass Effect: Andromeda, though a similar vehicle known as the ND-1 Nomad was featured instead. The Mako was widely criticized for being awkward to control in the game's vehicle sections, which was also described as lacking in meaningful content, leading to its removal as a drivable vehicle from later titles due to the substantial negative feedback. However, retrospective opinions of the vehicle have recognized it as an iconic aspect of the series in spite of its gameplay flaws.

== Development ==
The Bioware team was inspired heavily by early space exploration games such as Starflight and Star Control II, according to Bioware founder Ray Muzyka. Noting the influence of Star Control II, writer Mike Laidlaw explained that "the inspiration is all over the Mass Effect series", particularly "the Mako, which was a direct nod to the lander gameplay of Star Control II".

Multiple concepts were considered for the Mako early in development, including a rover, a tank, and a scout vehicle.A hovering feature was included in some concepts, which is later utilized for the M-44 Hammerhead, an optional purchased add-on for Mass Effect 2 which is only used for linear, specific missions. The Mako's final design references a modern armored personnel carrier with a darkened, armored-glass front and six wheels. Casey Hudson, director of the original Mass Effect trilogy, acknowledged that the Mako was inspired by the BIG TRAK / bigtrak, a programmable electric toy vehicle envisioned for use on the moon or a planetoid style environment.

In response to a line of questioning about the Mako's subsequent removal as a drivable vehicle during an interview in 2010, Hudson explained that the team thought of the first game's Mako missions as a "value-add", in that the Mako is a "totally supplementary" option added by the developers when in fact, they did not need to. He observed that players often perceived the Mako segments to be on equal footing with the game's other missions and thus apply the same expectations of richness and quality. Noting that the player's perspective is always the right perspective and it is the developer's responsibility to understand why they play the game a certain way, Hudson remarked that it was an important lesson for the developers to consider whether the addition of certain gameplay elements would be perceived as a "value-add", as it will be judged along with the rest of the game and held to the same standards.

Bioware announced at San Diego Comic-Con 2014 the Mako vehicle would return in the next installment in the series due to its exploration emphasis. The panel team indicated that the Mako would be customizable and that they wanted to make it fun to play: it will now be more agile and takes advantage of the newer open spaces, though it no longer have an attached cannon. BioWare's Mike Gamble explained that, "We're playing around with a bunch of different physics for the Mako. The thing that we have to do is make sure it is as responsive as possible. We've learned a thing or two over the years." Aaron Flynn noted that the development team for the Need for Speed series was consulted for guidance and advice to improve the vehicle's gameplay experience for Andromeda. He claimed that Andromeda's iteration of the Mako does not have the multiple edge cases from the first game "where you could do crazy stuff with it", and that it should be a high quality experience that compares well to any driving simulation video game. In an interview with Polygon, lead writer for Andromeda Mac Walters said that it was a non-controversial choice internally to bring back the Mako as the game is heavy on planetary exploration which is appropriate for the vehicle's role, in spite of its notoriety with fans and critics.

The 2021 Mass Effect Legendary Edition compilation implemented some design changes to improve the Mako's handling, such as tweaked turning physics, camera controls and thrusters which could give a temporary speed boost. Legendary Edition Project Director Mac Walters admitted that there is no consensus on how to present or update the Mako for the remastering process, and thus the option to switch back to the Mako's original handling is retained and available at the player's discretion.

== Depiction ==
The Mako's primary role is the Systems Alliance military's rapidly deployable transport and direct-fire support for infantry squads during planetary missions. The Mako's compact size and light weight allow it to fit in the small cargo bays of scouting frigates and corvettes commissioned by the Systems Alliance. It is equipped with micro-thrusters, and a small element zero core which can be used to reduce or increase mass, allowing the Mako to be safely air-dropped to virtually any world. This allows frigates to deploy their shore parties while limiting the ship's exposure to defensive anti-aircraft artillery. When used in conjunction with thrusters, mass reduction allows the Mako to extricate itself from difficult terrain. In low gravity environments, the core can be used to increase mass and provide greater traction. Several combat support vehicles using the Mako's basic chassis are also manufactured for Alliance surface garrisons.

The Mako is environmentally sealed and powered by a hydrogen-oxygen fuel cell to support Alliance military personnel who may find themselves fighting in a variety of planetary environments. The Mako possesses a ground-penetrating radar which allows detection of anti-vehicle mines and other subsurface anomalies, and its hull is covered with laser detection arrays which forewarn the crew of enemy laser-guided ordnance through the vehicle's micro-frame computer system.

In Mass Effect 2, the Mako can be found largely intact at the crash site of the destroyed SSV Normandy on the surface of Alchera, which demonstrates the vehicle's resilience and prompts a flashback by Commander Shepard of it parked inside the Normandy's cargo bay. Numerous Mako vehicles are deployed during the final battle for Earth in Mass Effect 3, and form the bulk of the Alliance mobile armor under Hammer Team. Several Mako vehicles are seen attempting to outrun Harbinger's attacks at the push toward the London Conduit, though one directly sidelines Shepard's squadmates after tumbling on their path, forcing Shepard to proceed alone.

The ND-1 Nomad, considered to be the successor to the Mako, appears in Andromeda and is integrated with multiple quality of life features the Mako lacked.

=== In other media ===
The Mako appears in the animated film Mass Effect: Paragon Lost. The interior of the vehicle is depicted for the first time in the Mass Effect media franchise, which is spacious enough to comfortably accommodate eight passengers.

In 2013, a fan constructed a 19.5" long and 8" tall replica of the Mako out of craft foam, a wooden dowel, and superglue. The base was salvaged from a 6-wheel RC truck from Target, and the body is patterned after a papercraft model designed by another fan. Its attached turret rotates on command via a remote control.

== Reception ==
"But the Big Trak homage is completely inexplicable. Perhaps Big Trak is worshipped as a totemic creature in Edmonton? Perhaps Greg and Ray were always denied one as kids and decided Mass Effect would be their late Christmas? Perhaps they were aiming for a Halo Warthog clone and just missed?"

— Kieron Gillen, "Mass Effect"

Overall critical reception of the Mako has been mixed. Some critics appreciated its exploration aspects, particularly in retrospective reviews, and considered it an iconic part of the Mass Effect series, while others described driving the vehicle as a clunky and frustrating experience. Mike Hoffman from The Escapist considered the Mako to be "the most divisive vehicle in video game history". Marty Sliva from IGN observed that the Mako was "infamous", and a "source of contention amongst fans of the original Mass Effect, partially due to the vehicle's wonky physics".

In his review of the PC version of Mass Effect, Kieron Gillen from Eurogamer called the Mako "adorably rubbish" and made fun of its "attack truck" design. Dan Ryckert from Game Informer said that the Mako "handles like an ambulance with beach balls for wheels", and that the vehicle sections "stuck out like a sore thumb" in an otherwise highly regarded role-playing game. Besides her criticism of the Mako's control mechanics, Carolyn Gudmundson from GamesRadar also complained that the vehicle's shields took overly long to recharge, even with squadmates possessing high tech scores as its passengers. Brenna Hillier from VG247 commented that "ticking every side content box in Mass Effect required a lot of Mako time, and feedback was negative enough that BioWare mostly dropped ground vehicles for the two later games".

In a 2010 article, IGN staff argued that BioWare's decision to remove the Mako and all vehicle exploratory elements from Mass Effect 2 was an overreaction, as they felt that the vehicle's technical issues could have been addressed and refined, noting that "vehicles are often a welcome feature in games that revolve around on-foot combat. They offer a variation in combat pacing and speed up exploration that would otherwise be impossible on foot" and that the Mako or a similar vehicle should return for Mass Effect 3. Matt Boyd from GamesRadar emphasized the Mako's significance as that "even the initial teaser trailer closed with Shepard dropping the Mako into Geth-infested territory"; he acknowledged that the Hammerhead's hovering capabilities as "merciful" compared to the Mako's flawed mechanics, but he disliked the lack of exploration the player can perform with the Hammerhead as well as its weak defenses. Rowan Kaiser from Kotaku praised the Mako sections for giving the story sections of Mass Effect a "sense of speed" that later games lacked, as well as illustrating the size of the universe. Hayley Williams, also from Kotaku, recalled that the Mako was an "awkward, necessary game feature that became part joke, part legend"; while she argued that "anyone who managed to complete the drive up to Peak 15 without driving off the edge multiple times deserves a medal" due to its controls and questionable physics, Williams noted that "a lot of players missed the freedom that it offered" and that it was at least situationally useful in open world combat situations.

BioWare's announcement that an improved version of the Mako would return as a drivable vehicle in Andromeda was well received. Steve Hannley from Hardcore Gaming welcomed the announcement and called the Mako a "fan-favorite". After playing the demo for Andromeda where she took control of the Nomad within the time span of half an hour, Williams observed that the Mako and the Nomad are "fairly similar in both design and function", and that it was easier and more fun to drive.
