= Estelle Harman =

American acting coach

- Born: Estelle Karchmer; September 11, 1922; Beaumont, Texas, U.S.
- Died: April 30, 1995 (aged 72); Hollywood, California, U.S.
- Spouse: Samuel Harman (1947-1995; her death)
- Children: Deborah Harman (b. 1959), Alexis Harman (b. 1961), Eden Harman (1963-2016)

Estelle Harman (September 11, 1922 – April 30, 1995) was an influential American acting coach in Los Angeles, recognized for her dynamic approach to film acting education.

== Biography ==
Harman began her career as an acting instructor at UCLA in the early 1940s. By the 1950s, she had moved to Universal Studios as Head of Talent Development, succeeding Rosenstein after his death in 1952. Harman was known for blending Modern acting techniques with Lee Strasberg's Method, focusing on script analysis and emotional authenticity through personal substitutions. Notable students included Rock Hudson, Bill Bixby, Tony Curtis, Myrna Hansen, and Audie Murphy.

In 1957, after the decline of studio contracts, Harman established the Estelle Harman Actors Workshop in Los Angeles. The workshop was celebrated for its rigorous curriculum that met federal requirements for financial aid, and was accredited by the National Association of Technical and Trade Schools in 1976, making it one of the few acting schools at the time to achieve such recognition.

Her teaching philosophy emphasized the 'independent actor,' capable of applying various acting methodologies without adhering strictly to one doctrine. Students from the later workshop years include Cady McClain, D.C. Douglas, A. Martinez, and Gregory Harrison.

Her innovative approaches influenced numerous actors, including Sharon Gless, who noted that Harman had revised her teaching style from an 'outside-in' to an 'inside-out' approach because of her.

== Legacy ==
Estelle Harman's contributions to the field of acting education left a lasting impact on Hollywood's training methods. She died in 1995, leaving behind a legacy of trained actors who continue to influence the industry. Her daughter, Eden Harman Bernardy, became a respected acting coach in Los Angeles. Eden carried on her mother's legacy in the acting community until her untimely death in 2016.
