= Normandy (Mass Effect) =

Fictional spacecraft

- Mass Effect vehicles
- The SSV Normandy SR-1 as it appears in Mass Effect
- First appearance: Mass Effect
- Last appearance: Mass Effect 3: Citadel
- Based on: Battle of Normandy

Information
- Affiliation: Systems Alliance Navy; Cerberus (ME2)
- Launched: 2183 (SR-1); 2185 (SR-2)
- Decommissioned: 2183, Omega Nebula (SR-1)
- Captain: Captain Anderson (ME prologue); Commander Shepard
- Combat vehicles: M35 Mako (ME); M-44 Hammerhead (ME2); UT-47 Kodiak (ME2 and ME3)
- Auxiliary vehicles: Kodiak drop shuttles (shuttle bay); Passenger escape pods

General characteristics
- Class: Normandy II-class Heavy Stealth Reconnaissance Frigate (ME2 and ME3)
- Registry: SSV Normandy (ME and ME3); CAW Normandy (ME2)
- Armaments: 6 Chimera-class mass accelerator autocannons (SR-1); 2 Mk. IV Thanix-class cannons (SR-2) Both variants: 1 Mk. II Javelin Missile Battery; 40 Z-016 Javelin-class disruptor torpedoes
- Defenses: Enhanced Defense Intelligence (SR-2); Cyclonic/Multicore barrier technology (SR-2); Silaris-A Modular/Ablative Super Armor (SR-2) Both variants: Stealth Systems; 6 GARDIAN point-defense laser Kinetic Barrier; LIDAR/Radar/Spectroscope sensor systems
- Maximum speed: 3.6 trillion mph
- Propulsion: Four antiproton thrusters LOCKE Propulsion Units; Heed Industries Helios Thruster Module (SR-2)
- Power: Element Zero Mk. II Tantalus FTL-Drive Core; Secondary Fusion Plant; Tertiary Extended Fuel Cells (SR-2)
- Length: 170 metres (560 ft) (SR-1); 216 metres (709 ft) (SR-2)
- Width: 96 metres (315 ft) (SR-2)
- Height: 24 metres (79 ft) (SR-2)
- Population volume: 12 skeleton crew (SR-1); 48 crewmen "hotbunk" (Note: Crew Quarters; excluding senior officers / VIPs / squad members improvised or private quarters) (SR-2)

The Normandy-class SR (Note: officially Systems Alliance Space Vehicle Normandy Stealth Reconnaissance) are two fictional spacecraft in the Mass Effect video game franchise. She first appears in Mass Effect as the SSV Normandy SR-1, the product of a joint venture between the human Systems Alliance and the Turian Hierarchy, and described as the most advanced military stealth starship in the galaxy within the series. An improved version of the ship known as the Normandy SR-2, though no longer a commissioned spaceship of the Alliance Navy, is later constructed by the paramilitary organization Cerberus and appears from Mass Effect 2 onwards. Both iterations of Normandy have Jeff "Joker" Moreau (voiced by Seth Green) as the pilot in command, while the SR-2 is integrated with an artificial intelligence entity known as EDI (voiced by Tricia Helfer). She functions as the primary means of transport, war room, and base of operations for the player, in the role of Spectre Commander Shepard, and their crew, as they travel throughout the Milky Way and fight hostile aliens such as the Reapers.

The Normandy has been praised by critics for its visual design, level design, and its appearance in the original Mass Effect trilogy, where it plays a pivotal role in the war against the Reapers and their servants.

== Characteristics and service history ==
=== Normandy SR-1 ===
In Mass Effect 1, the Normandy derives her name from the Normandy landings of World War II. The initial Normandy was created in 2183 as an advanced prototype "deep scout" stealth frigate with help from the Turians, a race of aliens who were once hostile to humans. The Normandy SR-1 is divided into three main decks. The three decks are: Command Deck (Bridge, Main Airlock, CIC, briefing/communications room); Crew Deck (Crew's quarters, Medical bay, Captain's quarters and office); Engineering and Storage (Main engine, Mako bay, Armory)

Most of her revolutionary technology is incorporated into her source of propulsion, the Tantalus drive core, which is also the source of her stealth capabilities. By temporarily "tucking in" and "storing" the heat energy produced within her hull to evade detection, Normandy can briefly travel swiftly undetected or drift passively for a lengthy time of observation, though this technique is not without danger. The stored heat must eventually be released, otherwise the ship risks cooking her own crew alive. To aid in the stealth, the Tantalus drive allows Normandy to move without the use of heat-emitting thrusters. The Normandy is armed with GARDIAN (General ARea Defensive Integration Anti-spacecraft Network) point defense lasers, a spinal mass accelerator cannon, and advanced Javelin disruptor torpedoes, as well as kinetic barriers.

=== Normandy SR-2 ===
In Mass Effect 2, with great labor and elaborate secrecy, Normandy SR-2 was built by Cerberus to be a larger, more powerful vessel upon the original's destruction, with the intent to serve as a successor and a base of operations for Project Lazarus' newly resurrected Commander Shepard. Envisioned with a more hospitable interior design based on the layout of the original (with five decks compared to SR-1's three), more crew-oriented comforts and civilian accommodations (like leather seats, a small kitchen area, and two observation decks, one of which contains a bar and poker table) are available. She features greater space in living quarters, research laboratory, and cargo bay. She now possesses shuttles that can be used for more precise landings the spacecraft cannot attempt. The list of upgrades is numerous, which the player has the option of researching and applying in the second and third games. Combined with her speed and maneuverability, Normandy is now capable of significant offensive feats, equipped with Javelin disruptor torpedoes, point-defense lasers, and the Thanix cannon, a Reaper-based weapon. She's even defensively great, thanks to the addition of kinetic barriers, deflective armor, and stronger shielding. Finally, Normandy is also given an onboard AI in the form of the "Enhanced Defense Intelligence", colloquially referred to as "EDI", who later becomes a squad member in Mass Effect 3. EDI coordinates many of the ship's combat functions, assisting, and even supplanting human piloting if needed.

Cerberus's many alterations produced a craft nearly double the original's size and mass, now armed and armored with even more sophisticated tech. All this required an even larger Tantalus drive core to compensate. This new core is housed within a sphere which holds element zero and is technologically different from the original Tantalus core; the manner in which it generates an immense output of power for the ship is meant to evoke a super-collider. The ship still retains the SR-1's stealth characteristics, but is now more sustainable. However, unlike the SR-1, the SR-2 can no longer land on every planet due to her increased mass, requiring shore parties to use a shuttle to get to a planet's surface.

The Normandy SR-2 first enters service in 2185, two years after the end of Mass Effect. The Illusive Man had Cerberus build the SR-2 as the headquarters of the Lazarus Cell—the newly revived Commander Shepard and his/her team—to aid them in their mission to stop the Collectors' galaxy-wide campaign of human abductions. The ship's communicator was modified to provide instantaneous contact with the Illusive Man. As part of the final mission of Mass Effect 2, the severity of the damage Normandy receives while fighting the Collectors is heavily dependent on how many upgrades the player managed to research and purchase for the ship.

In Mass Effect 3, the Normandy SR-2 Command Deck's the briefing/communications room were relocated, and the Tech Lab and Armory were gutted and removed; replaced by a war room staffed by dozens of military analysts, strategists and communication aides who would help the Commander Shephard throughout the Reaper Invasion. The Armory makes its return on the Main Hangar Deck. Aside from not receiving any major modifications, Normandy SR-2 undergoes a further retrofit in 2186; although the retrofits are not completed in time before the Reaper invasion, she is repainted in the Alliance Navy colors of blue and white after reentering the hands of the Systems Alliance on Earth following the events of Mass Effect 2: Arrival, becoming more like a military vessel once again. In spite of her relatively small size compared to other starships in the series, the Normandy is the Alliance's "tip of the spear" that punches well above her class, and continues to be touted as the fastest, the stealthiest, most advanced, and most iconic vessel of the Alliance fleet. She is the flagship that led the charge of united Citadel alien races in the Battle for Earth at the game's finale.

=== Auxiliary Vehicles ===
==== M35 Mako ====
In Mass Effect, the SR-1 carries the M35 Mako, a six-wheeled infantry fighting vehicle equipped with thrusters, a 155mm mass accelerator cannon, and a coaxial machine gun. The Mako is designed to fit in the small cargo bays of Alliance scouting frigates such as Normandy. Its small size and low weight allow it to be easily deployed to virtually any world. In Mass Effect 2, the Mako can be found at the crash site of the destroyed SSV Normandy on Alchera, partially encased in ice and rock but otherwise almost completely intact.

==== M-44 Hammerhead ====
In Mass Effect 2, the SR-2 carries the M-44 Hammerhead, a hovering infantry fighting vehicle that functions as a replacement to the Mako. It is only usable in the DLC missions Firewalker and Overlord, and does not play a main story role, nor does it return in Mass Effect 3.

==== UT-47 Kodiak Drop Shuttle ====
In Mass Effect 2 and Mass Effect 3, interplanetary flight personnel carriers stored in the SR-2's cargo bay are two UT-47 Kodiak that can be used to make landings the new Normandy could not attempt. The A-model shuttles are employed significantly more in Mass Effect 3, where they (along with the ship) are retrofitted to Alliance specs, repainted in Alliance colors, and are now armed with mass accelerator cannons on both sides of each craft. The Kodiak is nicknamed "Combat Cockroach" by Alliance marines because of its durability and looks.

== Development ==
The idea of the Normandy as a mobile hub which transported the party from planet to planet was inspired by the Ebon Hawk starship in Star Wars: Knights of the Old Republic, a previous BioWare game. Early concepts of the ship explored the designs of a fighter jet, a cruiser, a smuggler's ship, and a stealth vessel, while a lot of drawing work was involved in visualizing the variety of machinery housed within the ship's interiors. Normandy's final design references delta-wing fighters and the Concorde for an aggressive, futuristic look. The ship is depicted with sufficient cargo space to store the Mako, and her sizable crew meant that the ship's interiors needed to be presented as a living space where crew members could live comfortably for months at a time. When docking on space stations, Normandy is received by extendable arms which attach to the ship; the designers purposely never included visible landing gear on the Normandy as the ship is meant to hover. Senior Art Director Derek Watts of BioWare stated in a mini-documentary that the "SSV" letters were originally written on the ship's hull, but the developers opted to remove them due to the fact that they would appear to say "ASS" if the ship ever flew upside down.

The destruction of the Normandy SR-1 early in Mass Effect 2 allowed the team freedom to review and amend her design. Ease of navigation of the ship's interior as well as a sense of familiarity for returning players were prioritized as the SR-2 is supposed to feel like a more technologically advanced version of the SR-1, albeit with increased space and rooms for up to one dozen squad mates that Shepard could recruit in Mass Effect 2. A "muscle car" element to the ship's painted exterior was considered in order to give Normandy a more aggressive feel than a typical spaceship or fighter craft. Customization options for Normandy's exterior, which could have gone up to five levels, were ultimately cut as scenes in outer space would not benefit from graphical quality produced by pre-rendering. Other elements which have been adjusted include the tail fins, the placement of the engine core, and the size of the wings in proportion to the fuselage. The final look for the Normandy SR-2 is a sleeker exterior, a larger interior with multiple floors, and her cockpit layout had been overhauled to improve recognition. For Mass Effect 3, the design team wanted to convey the sense that Normandy had been captured and studied by the Alliance; red and blue color changes were originally thrown into concept to show that the ship is always in high alert as it is operating during wartime. A subplot involving an assassin or saboteur breaking into Shepard's quarters was considered during production, but was ultimately cut from the game's final release.

== Merchandise ==
Dark Horse created a 6 1/4" scale model of the Normandy SR-2 in 2011.

Dark Horse Direct created a 14" replica of the Mass Effect: Normandy SR-1 and Mass Effect: Cerberus Normandy SR-2

Master Replicas produce a 220 mm long Die Cast Normandy SR2 as part of their ongoing Mass Effect range

== Reception ==
The Normandy was praised from a design standpoint, with Andy Kelly of PC Gamer stating that her "hard 70's sci-fi edge" looks "cool", as well as "cold and functional". However, he also noted that her interior ambiance changed in subsequent games, becoming more warm and inviting after she was rebuilt by Cerberus, and again becoming colder and less comfortable in its final incarnation. Edge magazine stated that both Normandy vessels were "remarkable", and that the ship's main power lies in character interactions. The ability to optionally explore the ship and speak to crew members was a "crucial" point due to the game's emphasis on choice. Alex Donaldson of RPG Site stated that he found few hub areas "as memorable and special" as the Normandy SR-1, calling it "integral to the player's view of the Mass Effect universe".

EDI has been discussed within the context of her role as the AI personification of the Normandy SR-2. PC Gamer lauded EDI's characterization as an AI character and discussed her gameplay utility of being an actual spaceship as part of her role as a squadmate.

== Legacy ==
Kat Bailey of USgamer claimed the Sanctuary 3 ship of Borderlands 3 to be inspired by the Normandy, although she also noted that comparing it to the "iconic" Normandy "feels a little sacrilegious".

SSV Normandy SR-1, the first iteration of the ship, is featured as an easter egg in the science fiction survival game No Man's Sky as part of a crossover event in May 2021.
