= Geth =

Fictional robotic species from Mass Effect

Geth Servant of the People
- Mass Effect race
- A regular Geth engineer as it appears in Mass Effect 3's multiplayer mode
- First appearance: Mass Effect: Revelation (2007)
- Created by: BioWare

In-universe information
- Home world: Rannoch
- Sub-races: Geth troopers, Geth armatures, Geth colossi, Geth flyer, Geth drones, Geth heavy drones
- Notable members: Legion

The Geth are a fictional extraterrestrial robotic species in the Mass Effect multimedia franchise developed by BioWare and published by Electronic Arts. Originally introduced in the 2007 tie-in novel Mass Effect: Revelation, the Geth are a synthetic race of networked artificial intelligences whose overall intelligence increases when operating in proximity of one another. The Geth went through several design iterations before their final appearance was selected, with the art team drawing inspiration from insects and Quarian environmental suits. Most Geth are of humanoid shape; however, some are quadruped or aerial.

The Geth play an important role in the Mass Effect universe as the main enemy the player encounters in Mass Effect. In Mass Effect 2 and Mass Effect 3, the Geth appear as situational enemies or allies, and players gain an inside perspective on them through Legion. The Geth are portrayed as a synthetic species which was designed by the Quarians as a tool of labor and war. In the fictional Quarian language, the word "Geth" means "servant of the people". As the Quarians realized the Geth were becoming self-aware, they attempted to destroy them, leading to an armed conflict known as the Morning War. This war serves as the background for both the Geth and the Quarians, culminating in the near-annihilation of the Quarian population. In its aftermath, the surviving Quarians were forced out of their home world, Rannoch, and now nomadically wander space.

The Geth have attracted significant commentary, often ranking high in multiple "top species" lists in the Mass Effect franchise. Critics and scholars have analyzed them through various philosophical, theological, and sociopolitical lenses to explore themes of artificial intelligence, labor struggles, and post-colonialism, examining the ethical implications of synthetic life.

== Concept and design ==
The Geth design underwent several iterations before the final design was selected by the Mass Effect art team. According to the game's bonus disc, early concepts depicted the Geth as organic-synthetic hybrids similar to the concept behind Bishop from Aliens. Thus, the art team initially followed similar design principles to the ones used for other organic Mass Effect races. At one stage of development, the Geth were envisioned as human skeletal figures composed of a plastic muscle-like material. This concept was ultimately rejected, as the designers wanted the Geth to resemble Quarians and not humans. Other iterations included a machine form composed primarily of multiple tube-like structures with multiple eyes on its head, and a cyborg featuring dolphin-like skin.

For the final design, the art team opted for a more mechanical approach, trying to make them stand out from synthetic enemies in other science-fiction universes. Their head design was originally envisioned for the Geth armature, a specific quadrupedal Geth enemy. This design also featured a protruding chest, inspired by the anatomy of some animal species such as pigeons. Elements from earlier iterations were kept, including the aforementioned tube-like elements, which are integrated into the back of the final version. This appearance was also intended to closely resemble Quarian environmental suits, denoting the fact that the Geth had been modelled after their creators. Narrative-wise, Mass Effect writer Trick Weekes noted that the writing team wanted to avoid the familiar trope of artificial intelligence being portrayed as "all but a human brain that happens to be in a robot". Weekes further explained that they were drawn to a model where Geth intelligence forms through consensus and grows stronger the more of them are present, setting them apart from both organic thinking and conventional science fiction AI.

In designing Geth technology, the art team drew inspiration from insects. Geth spacecraft feature a set of legs that make them resemble giant metallic insects. These leg-like structures were made to mimic a fly rubbing its legs together. Due to the abundance of Geth enemies in the first Mass Effect, the species was designed with a wide array of weapons and platforms. The Geth were originally intended to be sidelined for the next entries in the series, but they were ultimately kept due to their positive reception in the first Mass Effect. For a quest in Mass Effect 3 that takes place in Rannoch, the Quarian home world, the art team was inspired by the industrial style of Lloyd's building in London's main financial district to show that the Geth had kept it in a pristine and ordered state while they remained on the planet.

The Geth were to play an important role in the canceled fifth entry in the Mass Effect franchise, Mass Effect Universe. Before the announcement of the game's cancelation and the closure of BioWare, the Geth had made an appearance in many teaser trailers released on November 7, a date celebrated by BioWare and the Mass Effect fandom as the official Mass Effect day. In 2021, a piece of concept art depicting a massive crater whose shape closely resembled that of a Geth was released. The following year, BioWare released a short video in which Liara T'Soni appears to be engaged in a conversation with a Geth. In 2023, BioWare once again used that date to show a teaser followed by a poster depicting a club scene populated by various species. Among them was a Geth that appears to be wearing clothing. Shortly after the game's cancelation on October 21, 2026, leaked information regarding its plot noted that the Geth were to be one of three superpowers in a galactic Cold War.

=== Types ===
A Geth colossus as it appears in Mass Effect

The Geth were designed with a variety of shapes and sizes, with several different types present throughout the trilogy. In addition to the standard humanoid Geth, a number of specialized units are encountered throughout the franchise.

- Geth armature and Geth colossus: Geth armatures are massive quadruped Geth units equipped with heavy weapons and shields designed by the art team to provide the player with a large and dangerous enemy to fight against. According to the Mass Effect codex, an in-game compilation of lore, they are "quadruped all-terrain heavy weapons platforms", noting their similarity to modern armored vehicles. It was originally planned for a mounted turret to be present on their heads, but it was removed to allow for multi-directional aiming. An even larger version was also designed, the Geth colossus.
- Geth drone, Geth heavy drone, and Geth flyer: The Geth drones and heavy drones were designed by the art team to bear a similarity to the standard Geth while providing a fast-moving enemy for the player to contend with. The Geth flyer was designed to serve as an aerial platform for Geth troopers, although it would ultimately only be used by Saren Arterius, the primary villain of the first Mass Effect game.

== Fictional attributes ==
=== Technology ===
Within the Mass Effect universe, the Geth are presented as networked artificial intelligences that lack any inherent connection to their physical body. The different bipedal or quadrupedal forms encountered throughout the series act as interchangeable "mobile platforms" that one or multiple Geth programs can upload themselves to. Individual Geth programs are depicted as possessing minimal processing power, sufficient only for executing and interpreting their most basic motor functions and sensory inputs. However, the networked artificial intelligence mentioned above allows them to connect with each other and cooperate to allocate part of their processing power toward more complex reasoning and tasks. The series' narrative depicts the Geth as operating within a collective consciousness in which each Geth program has the ability to share data and experiences with others.

=== Culture and society ===
The existence of Geth culture is a point of debate in the Mass Effect lore, as an individual Geth program is depicted as possessing only a rudimentary, animal-like intelligence. However, when in proximity to other programs, their networked processing power allows them to employ advanced behaviors like tactical planning, strategizing, and situational analysis. Whether this networked intelligence results in each Geth program having individual "personalities" remains a point of ambiguity within the narrative. Throughout the games, Geth society is organized around the principle of consensus. Rather than acting as individuals, Geth programs share a collective mind, communicating experiences and information across their network, instead of through independent action.

=== History ===
Within the series' backstory, the Geth were created by the Quarians as a tool of labor and war around 300 years prior to the first Mass Effect, modelled after their creators. The term "Geth" means "servant of the people" in the fictional Quarian language. Initially, the Geth were not intended to develop true intelligence, as safeguards had been implemented by the Quarians to guarantee their non-sentience. However, as the Quarians became more reliant on them, their networked processes made them become exponentially more intelligent, eventually being used as a means to gain self-awareness.

The species' background history centers on a conflict triggered when the Geth began to question their own existence, reaching the point of inquiring whether they possessed a soul. The Quarians interpreted this behavior as a malfunction and demanded the deactivation of all Geth programs. The Geth, who had intended no initial harm to their creators, fought back in self-defense and triggered a galactic conflict. This event, which ended with the death of most of the Quarian population, serves as an element of the game's worldbuilding, explaining the Quarian exile from their home planet of Rannoch into the Migrant Fleet, a massive flotilla of salvaged ships of varying shapes and sizes that nomadically wanders space. Following the end of the war, the Geth are depicted as having earned an unfavorable reputation amongst the many species in the galaxy. However, the Geth did not pursue any further attacks on the Quarians, portrayed as only wanting to establish a peaceful society.

== Appearances ==
The Geth were first introduced in the tie-in novel Mass Effect: Revelation, where they are described as a networked synthetic race that had been created by the Quarians and had ultimately rebelled against their creators.

=== Mass Effect ===
In the original Mass Effect, the Geth are presented as the primary antagonistic force that Shepard, the game's protagonist, encounters. The game's narrative begins with a Geth attack on the human colony of Eden Prime, where Shepard first encounters them and Saren Arterius, a rogue Turian member of the Spectres, an intergalactic intelligence group with almost no limitations imposed on their actions. Influenced by the Reaper Sovereign, Saren leads the Geth to attack multiple planets. As the story progresses, Shepard collaborates with the Salarian military to prevent Saren and the Geth from establishing a large-scale Krogan army. The game also allows the player to examine the Geth-Quarian conflict from a Quarian perspective through Tali'Zorah, a squadmate who can accompany Shepard on missions.

=== Mass Effect 2 ===
Toward the conclusion of the game, Shepard meets Legion, a gestalt consciousness composed of a collective of networked artificial intelligences that serves as the series' first Geth squadmate if reactivated. It is then disclosed that only a subset of the Geth known as the "heretics" had followed Saren Arterius' orders and allied with the Reapers in return for a Reaper body that all Geth could upload themselves to. The remainder, known as the "true Geth", declined Sovereign's offer. During Legion's loyalty mission, a specialized side-quest that Shepard has to complete in order to gain each squadmate's loyalty, Shepard must decide whether to rewrite the code of the "heretics" and force them to rejoin the "true Geth" or destroy them entirely.

In the paid downloadable content Mass Effect 2: Overlord, the human-supremacist group Cerberus attempts to gain control of the Geth. To achieve this, they connect a human test subject to a virtual intelligence, an advanced user interface software designed to simulate natural conversation. Approaching the end of the DLC, Shepard is faced with a decision regarding the test subject's fate.

=== Mass Effect 3 ===
In Mass Effect 3, Shepard must unite the galaxy's various species to fight off the ongoing Reaper invasion. During the course of the narrative, the Quarians decide to make an attempt to retake their home world, Rannoch. As the story progresses, Shepard encounters either Legion or, if Legion died in Mass Effect 2, a replacement Geth virtual intelligence program. Whoever Shepard may encounter then reveals that the Geth had accepted aid from the Reapers in order to secure their survival in their fight against the Quarians. The outcome of this conflict is dependent on player choice regarding decisions involving Tali'Zorah, Legion and the interactions between them and their respective species. The narrative concludes with Shepard either supporting the Quarians, siding with the Geth, or brokering a peace deal. If a peace agreement is reached or Shepard allies with the Geth, the Reaper enhancements to the Geth code are retained, with the Geth becoming true individuals, while their alliance with them is severed. If the player otherwise decides to support the Quarians, the entirety of the Geth race is destroyed.

During a side-quest that must be done before the end of the conflict, Shepard enters the Geth consensus and gains an insight into the initial Geth uprising and the Geth-Quarian conflict from the Geth point of view, showing that not all Quarians had agreed with the start of the conflict.

The final choice presented at the game's conclusion to deal with the Reapers includes an option to destroy them. If chosen, this option results in the death of all artificial intelligences, including the Geth.

=== Mass Effect: Andromeda ===
The Geth do not make a physical appearance in Mass Effect: Andromeda, but they play an indirect role in its backstory. They are responsible for the discovery of "Golden Worlds", a group of presumably habitable planets in the Andromeda Galaxy. To achieve this, the Geth built a faster-than-light telescope from three mass effect relays, a set of Reaper-built massive space installations that simplify space travel.

== Reception and analysis ==
=== Reception ===
The Geth have been featured in multiple ranked lists of the Mass Effect franchise's species and villains. Shubhankar Parijat of GamingBolt ranked the Geth #8 on his list of the best alien races in the franchise, due to their "fascinating" backstory and the use of Legion to convey their point of view. Similarly, Sean Murray of TheGamer placed the Geth at #4, noting the complexity of their fictional backstory and their power derived from networking thousands of artificial intelligences that endlessly debate and generally vote in favor of peaceful co-existence except when threatened. The Geth were ranked #48 in IGN's list of the 100 best video game villains, noting them as an example of "man's most fearsome technological nightmare" and emphasizing their ambush tactics. Jakub Mirowski of GamePressure, in his list of enemies he regretted killing, reflected on the emotional impact of fighting the Geth, stating that it was difficult to feel satisfaction in defeating them once it became clear they were on the verge of true sentience, capable of noble acts and profound sacrifices. Mirowski also pointed out how the Geth’s exploitation by the Reapers, so soon after their struggle for autonomy, evoked a surprising sense of compassion.

Shayna Josi of Game Rant argued that the Geth were one of the most interesting interpretations of AI in science fiction. Josi suggested that the discarded squadmate concept of the 'Geth Frankenstein' could be an interesting one to explore in the next Mass Effect game. Matthew Byrd of Den of Geek found parallels between the Geth and other synthetic species in science fiction. He noted that their networked AI "hivemind" is reminiscent of the Borg from Star Trek, while their design and philosophy draw clear comparisons to the Cylons from Battlestar Galactica. Eric Emin Wood invoked the Geth in his critique of Hanson Robotics, arguing that when an AI reaches a certain intellectual milestone, it should be considered a new form of life. Tyler Fischer of ComicBook.com discussed how the Geth could play a role in bringing back Commander Shepard in the next Mass Effect game.

The Geth-Quarian conflict has also been spotlighted: Carlos Morales of IGN Southeast Asia called it one of the most iconic confrontations in the franchise, essential for inclusion in Amazon's planned TV adaptation, while András Neltz of Kotaku described it as one of the most significant player decisions in the entire Mass Effect trilogy.

=== Analysis ===
Several scholars have analyzed the philosophical and literary roots of the Geth and drawn comparisons with historical events. Thomas Faller compared their emergence as self-conscious individuals to René Descartes' cogito ergo sum, Mary Shelley's Frankenstein and Isaac Asimov's Three Laws of Robotics; while Kelly I. Aliano drew comparisons between the Geth and theories of posthumanism and a potential "robot revolution". The Geth and their conflict with the Quarians have been examined through a post-colonialist lens. The decision to rewrite or destroy the "heretics" in Mass Effect 2 has been compared to the struggles endured by Indigenous peoples against settlers, while Vanessa Erat analyzed the Geth through the writings of MUD's creator Richard Bartle and Cow Clicker's creator Ian Bogost to conclude that the Geth–Quarian conflict illustrates video games' unique capacity to generate empathy with the vulnerable.

Other scholars have explored the sociological and theological implications of the Geth. Jordan Webber and Daniel Griliopoulos analyzed how their intelligence manifested through Hilary Putnam's functionalism, also using them as a warning about the possible dangers of AI. In Technology and Theology, Erin Archer examines the question of whether the Geth possess souls through the philosophical frameworks of Origen of Alexandria and Thomas Aquinas. Archer also examines the Geth's capacity for conscious free will, arguing that, had the Geth lacked free will, they would have all either followed Saren or rejected him.
