= Mass Effect 3: Citadel =

- Developer: BioWare
- Publisher: Electronic Arts
- Composers: Sam Hulick; Cris Velasco; Sascha Dikiciyan
- Series: Mass Effect
- Engine: Unreal Engine 3
- Platforms: PlayStation 3 Windows; Xbox 360
- Release: March 5, 2013
- Genres: Action role-playing, third-person shooter
- Mode: Single-player

Mass Effect 3: Citadel is a downloadable content (DLC) pack developed by BioWare and published by Electronic Arts for the 2012 action role-playing video game Mass Effect 3. It was released for PlayStation 3, Windows, and Xbox 360 in March 2013. The pack follows Commander Shepard and the crew of the Normandy SR-2 starship on shore leave, where they must uncover the truth surrounding a conspiracy against Shepard.

Citadel is the final major downloadable content pack for Mass Effect 3. It received very positive reviews from video game publications, who praised its humorous tone and focus on character interactions and relationships, although some criticism was aimed at the pack's reliance on fan service. Many critics described it as a "love letter" to the series, and felt that it was the best downloadable content pack of Mass Effect 3. Citadel was nominated for Best DLC at the 2013 Spike Video Game Awards, but ultimately lost to Far Cry 3: Blood Dragon.

== Gameplay ==
During the first act of the pack, the player must infiltrate a casino and avoid detection from guards in order to proceed.

Mass Effect 3: Citadel is a downloadable content (DLC) pack for the 2012 action role-playing video game Mass Effect 3. The pack takes place in 2186 on the Citadel, a deep-space station that serves as the political, cultural, and financial capital of the Milky Way galaxy. The player assumes the role of Commander Shepard, an elite human soldier who is captain of the Normandy starship. Shepard and the crew are summoned for shore leave, where they learn of a conspiracy against Shepard, and must battle against a private military corporation to defuse the threat.

The player's primary base of operations is a personal apartment that was lent to Shepard by Admiral Anderson, a war hero and mentor to Shepard who is currently on Earth. From the apartment, the player can customize furniture, initiate quests, interact with non-player characters, and later access other areas of the Citadel. The first half of the pack is story-focused and generally alternates between the apartment and third-person shooter gameplay around the Citadel, but also includes a casino infiltration mission in which some elements of stealth are required. The story culminates in a boss fight aboard the Normandy against Shepard's clone, whose battle tactics and character class are pre-selected to match that of the player's.

Once the story portion of the pack is resolved, Shepard is tasked with throwing a party for the crew. A new hub area called "Silversun Strip" becomes accessible, which includes an arcade, casino, and stores for buying party supplies. There is also a combat arena, which allows the player to participate in horde-style combat matches that resemble the format of the Mass Effect 3 multiplayer mode. While the player explores Silversun Strip, Shepard receives requests to meet with each crew member individually, which the player can choose to accept or reject. When ready, the player can begin the party, which has various combinations of guests, interactions, and tones based on player decisions.

== Development and release ==
Mass Effect 3: Citadel is the final piece of single-player DLC for Mass Effect 3. Unlike its immediate predecessor, Omega, which was developed at BioWare Montreal, Citadel was developed out of BioWare Edmonton, the same studio that headed development on the original Mass Effect trilogy. In order to provide players with a fitting send-off to the series, the company took an "all hands on deck" approach to the project, which included contributions from all eight staff writers, the return of chief Mass Effect 3 composer Sam Hulick, and participation from key voice actors such as Seth Green (Jeff "Joker" Moreau) and Raphael Sbarge (Kaidan Alenko). The pack was officially announced on February 21, 2013, and released worldwide on March 5 for PlayStation 3, Windows, and Xbox 360. Because of its large download size, Xbox 360 users were required to download Citadel in two separate parts, the first of which came with a cost and the second of which was free. The pack was not released for the WiiU version of Mass Effect 3.

== Reception ==
Reception

Aggregate score
Aggregator	Score
Metacritic	84/100 (PC); 90/100 (PS3); 84/100 (X360)

Review scores
Publication	Score
Eurogamer	9/10
GameSpot	7/10
IGN	9.1/10
PC Gamer (US)	90/100
Digital Trends	4.5/5

According to the review aggregator Metacritic, the PlayStation 3 version of Mass Effect 3: Citadel received "universal acclaim" while the Windows and Xbox 360 versions received "generally favorable reviews" from video game publications. Some outlets, including PlayStation Universe, considered Citadel to be the best downloadable content pack of Mass Effect 3. Many critics described the pack as a "love letter" to the series, such as Richard Cobbett of IGN, who posited: "Writing, level design, cinematography... pick any department, the passion bleeds out of every single pixel." Citadel was later nominated for Best DLC at the 2013 Spike Video Game Awards, but ultimately lost to Far Cry 3: Blood Dragon.

The pack's reliance on fan service was generally well-received, although some reviewers felt that Citadel ultimately went too far in that regard. For example, Maxwell McGee of GameSpot opined that the storyline played exclusively to diehard fans and that the central narrative lacked substance as a result. Along those same lines, Tom Senior of PC Gamer predicted that players unfamiliar with Mass Effect or Mass Effect 2 and their characters would not appreciate the pack as much as more invested players. Conversely, some critics such as Kirk Hamilton of Kotaku viewed the fan service very positively, who summarized: "It's an adventure written and designed with nothing but love for Mass Effect, an often goofy, ultimately touching farewell to the world and the characters that we've followed for the last six years."

Critics were highly complimentary of the character interactions, dialog, and humor contained within Citadel. Tom Phillips of Eurogamer described the dialog as "remarkably well written" and likened the tone of the pack to a milestone television episode where the writers "throw caution to the wind". Senior wrote that the tone was "perfectly pitched" and felt "affectionate, playful, and frivolous". Cobbett made similar observations but also noted that the overall tone of Citadel was significantly lighter than the base Mass Effect 3 game, making the contrast between the two feel jarring. Hamilton went a step further, positing that the plot of the pack felt entirely disconnected from the main game plot.

The second half of Citadel, in which players can access a new section of the Citadel, participate in a combat arena, and throw a party, received special praise. For example, Phillips applauded BioWare for making the events and scenes of the party variable based on player decisions. Senior, who criticized combat leading up to the second half of the pack, enjoyed the combat arena because it provided more enemy variety. Many critics, including Cobbett, specifically described the end of Citadel as "touching" and opined that it served as a more satisfying conclusion to the series than the actual Mass Effect 3 ending, which was controversial. Phillips concurred with this sentiment, writing that Citadel was a send-off to the series and a "touching goodbye" to its characters.
