= Commander Shepard =

Player character in the original Mass Effect trilogy of video games

- Mass Effect character
- The default male (left) and default female (right) Shepards, as presented on cover art for Mass Effect 3
- First appearance: Mass Effect (2007)
- Last appearance: Mass Effect 3: Citadel (2013)
- Voiced by: Mark Meer (male); Jennifer Hale (female)

In-universe information
- Occupation: SPECTRE
- Affiliation: Systems Alliance Navy
- Family: Captain Hannah Shepard (mother) (Note: Exclusive to a player character with the Spacer background.)

Commander Shepard is the player character in the Mass Effect video game series by BioWare (Mass Effect, Mass Effect 2, and Mass Effect 3).

A veteran soldier of the Systems Alliance Navy, an N7 graduate of the Interplanetary Combatives Training (ICT) military program, and the first human Citadel Council Spectre, Shepard works to stop the Reapers, a sentient machine race dedicated to wiping out all advanced organic life. Shepard is neither a hero, nor a villain; (Note: Paragon or Renegade morality system game mechanics) depending upon players' choices and actions, Shepard is the abstaining factor that acts as both on occasion and will take whatever action is deemed necessary when presented with impossible scenarios.

Shepard's gender, class, first name and facial appearance are chosen and customized by the player. The default male Shepard's face and body were modelled after Dutch model Mark Vanderloo, while Mark Meer provided the voice for the male Shepard. Jennifer Hale voiced the female Shepard. Since the player can choose the gender of Shepard, much of the dialogue revolving around the character is gender-neutral with only a few exceptions. In some other Mass Effect media, Shepard is pre-determined as a male character and referred to as such.

The character is inspired by and named after American astronaut Alan Shepard. Shepard's armor developed over the series and was originally intended to be red-and-white. Most promotional material for the series focused on the male Shepard, due to the studio's desire for a single identifiable hero, though both versions of the character were given equal priority during development. Various merchandise has been made, including several figurines. Shepard has made cameo appearances in other Electronic Arts games and is referenced in Mass Effect: Andromeda.

== Concept and creation ==
BioWare wanted players to feel special and empowered right from the start. Unlike other role-playing game protagonists, they felt Shepard should not be an entirely blank character for the player to create, in order to create a more "intense" experience; with the first Mass Effect being more cinematic than other BioWare video games, they felt they needed an "extra bit" with a sense of a specific flavor that can be caused by a memorable character, such as Star Trek's Captain Kirk or 24's Jack Bauer. Project director Casey Hudson also cited 24 as an influence on the kinds of morally ambiguous decisions presented to the player throughout the game's narrative.

The team decided that the player-created protagonist needed at least a fixed surname so that other characters could address the protagonist naturally in voiced dialogue. They wanted a name that was both "all-American" and common, which led them to start looking at the original seven astronauts. Alan Shepard was chosen due to fitting with the idea of "their" Shepard, being tough and respected, and fitting in with the character being the first human Spectre – Alan Shepard being the first American in space.

Shepard's physical performance was developed separately from the character's facial appearance. Lead cinematics animator Shane Welbourn recalled that an actor initially hired for motion capture had recently injured his back, producing movements that did not suit the military character the team wanted. Welbourn subsequently performed most of Shepard's motion-captured movements himself.

=== Appearance and design ===
Early armor designs for Shepard in the first Mass Effect were comparatively close-fitting or skintight; following fan feedback, Shepard's armor became progressively bulkier over the course of the series to give off an imposing presence. The armor became piece-based in Mass Effect 2 to stress the character's silhouette, as well as making them look "stronger and able to take more punishment". Despite this, the colors, as well as other elements of the armor and the commander's appearance, are customisable in Mass Effect 2.

The color of Shepard's default armor was originally red-and-white, but this was changed to charcoal grey, with a red-and-white stripe and the N7 logo, as Shepard looked too much like a medic. Art director Derek Watts recalled that the N7 mark originated from a logo he had seen on ski equipment. After it was added to an early design, the team repeatedly retained it until the insignia and stripe became identifying elements of Shepard's appearance. The red stripe in the N7 logo is meant to symbolise the blood the character must sacrifice to save the galaxy.

For the character customization at the start of the game, they focused on "quality and realism". In order to test out the customisation system, the team made various celebrity look-alikes to ensure it offered a wide enough variety. The team considered several approaches considered for the default male Shepard's face. Watts recalled that one experimental version used George Clooney's face as a reference; although Clooney was not intended to become the final model, the short hair and square jaw helped establish the direction of the character. Watts later encountered photographs of Mark Vanderloo and tested his likeness on the existing Shepard model. He felt Vanderloo provided a less exaggerated action-hero appearance and a look that was difficult to associate with any single contemporary ethnicity, which suited the series' future setting. Vanderloo's likeness was subsequently used for the default male Shepard.

During the development of the first game, the female Shepard was given equal importance as the male counterpart; unique lines were written for her as well as a unique romance option. An early animation test for the first game used a female Shepard model. Hudson described the female Shepard as a strong character in her own right rather than a caricature of a female role-playing protagonist, emphasizing that she could be sensitive while remaining confident and assertive. Although both versions of Shepard were playable from the first game, the male default Shepard initially dominated the series' promotional material. According to marketing director David Silverman, BioWare decided during the development of Mass Effect 3 to give the female Shepard greater visibility, including her own trailer and a place on the collector's edition packaging.

The six designs used for BioWare's initial 2011 vote to select the default female Shepard for Mass Effect 3.

While the default female face only changed slightly between the first and second game, the female Shepard's default appearance for Mass Effect 3 was substantially redesigned. BioWare placed six proposed design online and invited fans to vote for their preferred version through Facebook. The six candidates had been selected from a larger collection of concepts produced during development. The design depicting a blonde Shepard won the initial vote. BioWare then held a second vote to select the design's hair colour. A red-haired version won and became the default female Shepard used in Mass Effect 3.

For Mass Effect Legendary Edition, BioWare unified Shepard's customization options across the trilogy and expanded the character creator with additional skin tones and hairstyles. The same character code could also be used across all three games, allowing a customized Shepard to retain a consistent appearance throughout the trilogy. The default female Shepard introduced for Mass Effect 3 was made the default female appearance in all three games.

=== Voice ===
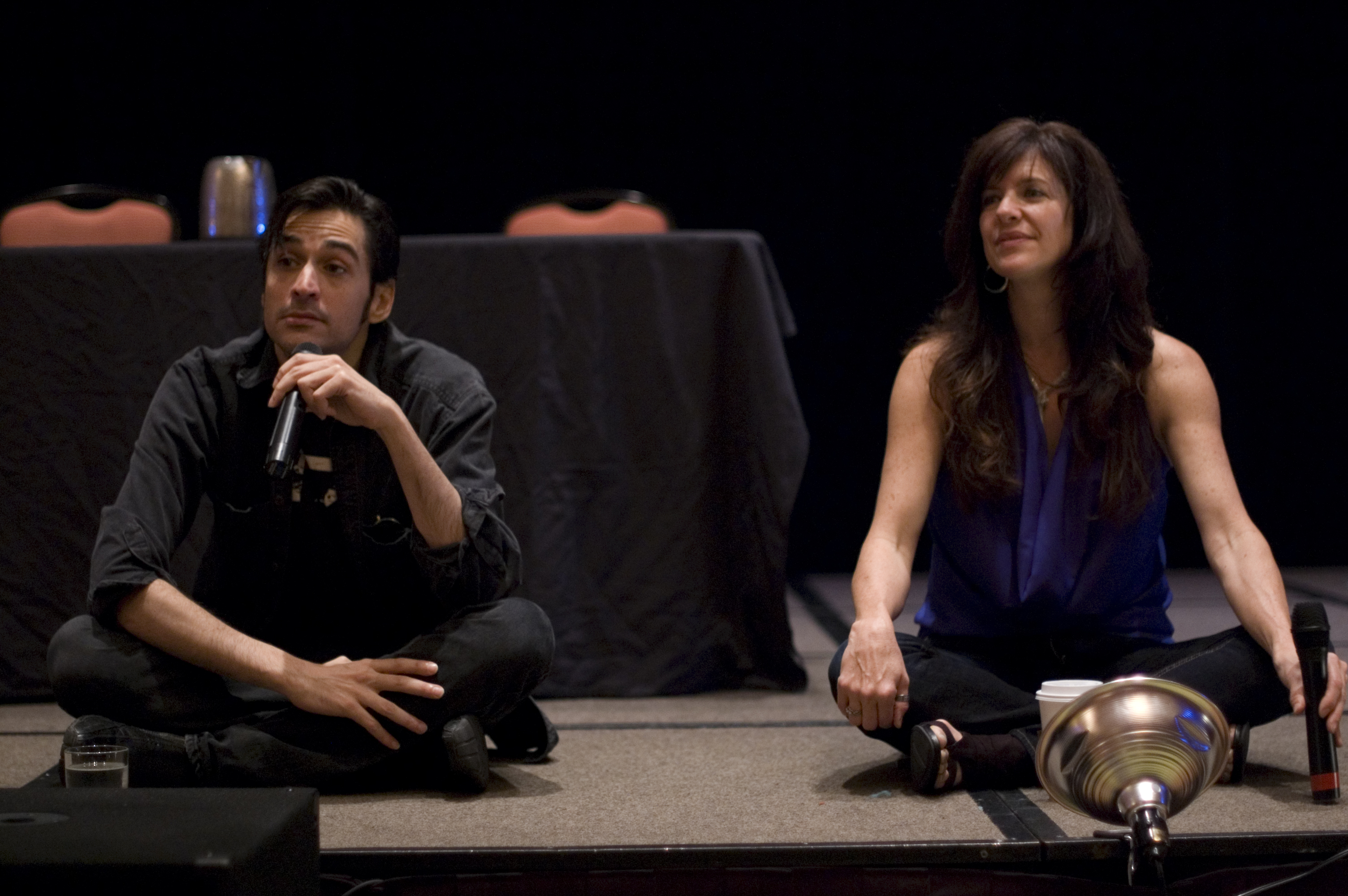
Mark Meer (left) and Jennifer Hale (right) provided the voices for the male and female Shepard.

The male and female versions of Shepard were voiced by Mark Meer and Jennifer Hale respectively. Both of them had worked with BioWare many times previously.

Meer had first worked with BioWare during the creation of Baldur's Gate II: Shadows of Amn and went on to voice other bit parts in their games. When he was first called in to work on Mass Effect, he expected to voice more bit parts, and was "pleasantly surprised" to get the role of Shepard. Caroline Livingstone gave voice direction during recording, and lead writer Mac Walters would occasionally sit in during recording sessions, allowing lines to be changed quickly.

Meer was initially directed to play Shepard as a restrained, professional military officer. He avoided making either the Paragon or Renegade responses sound so extreme that switching between them would make the character seem inconsistent. As the trilogy progressed and Shepard was placed under greater pressure, Meer was given more scope to vary the character's emotional delivery. Caroline Livingstone directed the recording sessions, with lead writer Mac Walters sometimes present so that dialogue could be revised during recording.

Hale approached Shepard primarily through the script rather than modelling the character on another science-fiction protagonist. Hale has said she is very invested in helping to "create" the stories of video games, though she herself is not a gamer. Although Hale does object to certain lines if they seem out-of-character in other works, she prefers not to mess with the words for Shepard and BioWare. That BioWare did not change the words based on gender considerations was one of Hale's favorite aspects of the series.

During recording for Mass Effect 3, Hale worked with Livingstone and Walters using a system that supplied the current line together with preceding dialogue and contextual directions. Multiple readings of the same line could be recorded with different emotional emphases, allowing an appropriate take to be selected later. Hale said Shepard's military background informed the character's controlled delivery. The branching dialogue also required her to avoid carrying an emotional state from one possible conversational path into lines that could be reached through another.

== Appearances ==
Shepard serves as the player character of the main Mass Effect game trilogy. The commander is a graduate of the Systems Alliance's – the "galactic face of humanity" – military N7 program, the highest grade of their "Interplanetary Combatives Training" that commands a great deal of respect, especially because of the hard difficulty of the program, divised in seven levels (one the lowest), the majority of the members leave it after being graduated N1, and since its creation, only ten people managed to finish the program. Their service before joining the military and the military event that allowed them to rise to fame are both chosen by the player before the game starts, out of three options each. Also customizable is Shepard's gender, character class and physical appearance. The player is given paraphrased dialogue options via a radial command menu called the "dialogue wheel", which Shepard will expand on when clicked. Different choices on the dialogue wheel can grant either Paragon or Renegade points, which will over time affect their physical appearance in Mass Effect 2 and Mass Effect 3: a higher Renegade score will cause Shepard's scars to worsen and their eyes to start glowing red, while a higher Paragon score will cause Shepard's scars to gradually heal and fade away.

Outside of the main trilogy, Shepard has been briefly mentioned in the novels Mass Effect: Ascension, Retribution, and Deception, and has also made a brief appearance in the third issue of the comic Homeworlds, with only the N7 logo on their armour being shown in-shot. Redemption, taking place two years before the second game's main events, concerns how Shepard's body was retrieved by Liara T'Soni and then given to Cerberus after the character's death in Mass Effect 2's prologue. The character, however, will not be making any further appearances in any Mass Effect games now that the main trilogy is over, and BioWare have said that they do not wish the next Mass Effect protagonist to just be another soldier or "Shepard 2".

=== Mass Effect ===
In the first game, the commander is serving under Captain David Anderson during the shakedown run of the highly advanced turian/human ship SSV Normandy SR-1, heading toward humanity's first ever colony, Eden Prime. However, it turns out the ship is actually being sent to collect a Prothean beacon (the Protheans being an advanced and now-extinct race whose technology could contain great discoveries) and give it to the Citadel Council, an executive committee who hold great sway in the galaxy, and who are recognised as an authority by most of explored space. A Spectre, an elite agent of the council with the authority to deal with situations "in whatever way they deem necessary", named Nihlus Kryik accompanies the mission to observe Shepard's candidacy to join the Spectres; if successful, this would make Shepard the first ever human Spectre and an exemplar of humanity's progress in galactic politics. However, Nihlus is killed during the mission when the geth, a race of sentient AIs, and Saren Arterius, a rogue Spectre, attack the colony to steal the beacon. Shepard manages to stop the colony from being destroyed but is hit by a blast from the damaged beacon before it blows up; as a result, Shepard begins to have visions of war and death.

After Saren's treachery is exposed to the Council through the use of an audio recording that mentions "the Reapers", which are believed to be a race of synthetic-organic starships that eradicate all organic civilization every 50,000 years, the Council revoke Saren's Spectre status and make Shepard the first ever human Spectre, though they believe the Reapers are merely a myth Saren is using to manipulate the geth. Shepard is instructed to take down Saren and is placed in charge of the Normandy and given free rein of the galaxy. Over the course of the game, it becomes clear that the visions are images of the Protheans being destroyed by the Reapers; the commander speaks to one of these Reapers, referred to as Sovereign, on the planet of Virmire, though the Council still believes them to be a myth.

Eventually, Saren, Sovereign and the geth launch an attack on the Citadel, the "political, cultural, and financial capital of the galactic community" and home of the council, intending to activate a mass relay inside it that will allow all the Reapers to arrive at once from dark space, destroy the Citadel, and begin their "harvest" of organic life. Shepard manages to stop them, destroy Sovereign, and save the Citadel. Depending on the player's choices, Shepard may either also save the council, or leave them to die to ensure Sovereign is destroyed or to build a new human-centric Council.

=== Mass Effect 2 ===
At the beginning of the game, Shepard is killed when the Collectors attack and destroy the Normandy. The commander is revived by Cerberus, a human-supremacist organization considered to be terrorists by the Citadel Council and the Systems Alliance, with instructions by Cerberus leader the Illusive Man to be brought back unaltered and exactly as they were before their death. The Illusive Man provides Shepard with both a new ship (the Normandy SR-2) and a crew, and sends them on various missions against the Collectors, who are revealed to be puppets of the Reapers.

Over the course of the game, Shepard must assemble a team to prepare for a final assault on the Collector base accessible only through the Omega-4 Relay, a relay that destroys all non-Collector ships that try to go through it. Depending on the player's choices during the final mission, it is possible that Shepard may fail to escape the Collector base and die, though the save cannot be imported to Mass Effect 3 if this is the case. At the end of this mission, the player is given the choice to either destroy the base or hand it over to Cerberus – if the player chooses the former, Shepard effectively cuts all ties with Cerberus, and the crew and squadmates join the commander.

Depending on the player's decision concerning the Council in the first game, Shepard can either be reinstated as a Spectre now that they have been revived, be rejected by Udina and the rest of the council or refuse Spectre status when offered it.

=== Mass Effect 3 ===
Shepard has been grounded and stripped of rank by the Alliance before the game starts, due to either working with Cerberus or blowing up a Mass Relay in the Mass Effect 2 DLC pack Arrival. After Earth is invaded by the Reapers, the Alliance reinstates them and sends them to ask the council for help, retaking command of the Alliance-refitted Normandy SR-2. Though the Council refuses, they either reinstate or uphold the commander's Spectre status.

Shepard must then work to forge alliances between the various alien races to ensure the survival of Earth, to fight against Cerberus forces from disrupting the war efforts, and to stop the Reapers from eradicating all organic life from the galaxy. Among the major decisions made by the player as part of the branching narrative of Mass Effect 3 include the resolution of the Krogan Genophage storyline, the outcome of the war between the geth and the quarians, and ultimately the fate of the Reapers and the rest of the galactic community.

Following the conclusion of one of the three original endings of Mass Effect 3, where Shepard activates a superweapon known as the Crucible on the Citadel to deal with the Reapers, the Normandy crashes on a distant planet after being caught in a wave of energy emitted by the Crucible. In some of the possible ending scenarios, the crew eulogizes Shepard by putting his or her name on the ship's memorial and flying away. If Shepard chose to destroy the Reapers with certain requirements fulfilled, however, the crew will hesitate placing Shepard's name on the memorial wall. In one possible ending, the chestpiece of a body with the N7 emblem is shown to be moving, suggesting Shepard might have survived.

=== Mass Effect: Andromeda ===
Shepard does not make a direct appearance, though players can select Shepard's gender at the start of the game. Shepard is referenced both in conversations between characters, and in audio logs sent by Liara T'Soni to Alec Ryder, the player character's father.

== Promotion and merchandise ==
The default male Shepard was used heavily in marketing, being featured on the covers for all three games and most trailers. The female Shepard was confirmed to be making an appearance in one of the trailers for the third game, and on one side of Mass Effect 3's Collector's Edition, in June 2011. The female Shepard had not been advertised heavily previously as marketing wanted to only showcase one character, so that consumers could easily understand who the hero was. For Mass Effect 3, BioWare wished to "acknowledge" the demand for material with the female Shepard.

Outside of the Mass Effect series, Shepard has also made cameo appearances in other Electronic Arts games. SkyHeroes features various different characters from EA games, acting as playable pilots during the game's multiplayer mode. Through downloadable content released on March 27, Shepard becomes available as an alternate skin for Serah and Noel within Final Fantasy XIII-2. An N7 armor and omni-blades become available in Kingdoms of Amalur: Reckoning if the demo for Mass Effect 3 has been completed; similarly, an N7 armor becomes available in Dead Space 3 if the player owns a copy of Mass Effect 3.

== Reception ==
Commander Shepard has received a generally positive reception and often appeared in reader's polls published by video game publications. Shepard was voted the primary Xbox 360 candidate in IGN's mock video game presidential election.

Shepard has appeared in numerous top video game character lists compiled by video game publications. GameDaily, Joe Juba, writing for Game Informer, chose Shepard as their favourite protagonist in their "2012 RPG of the Year Awards", saying that while the player changed the tone and context of many parts of Mass Effect, "Shepard never comes out of it looking any less awesome".

Not all critical reception has been positive. Maxim described the visual design of Shepard's armor as derivative. Andrew Goldfarb, for IGN, criticized the decision to revisit Shepard during the downloadable content of Mass Effect 3, believing that 3's ending was "final", and saying that he would have preferred to have a look at a new squad separate from Shepard.

Data published by BioWare between 2011 and 2013 for Mass Effect 2 and Mass Effect 3 showed that the player pick rate for male Shepard, sometimes referred to as "BroShep", was at 82% with the remainder choosing to play as a female Shepard, nicknamed "FemShep". In July 2021, the choice statistics for Mass Effect Legendary Edition released by BioWare revealed that 68% of players preferred to play as the male version compared to 32% for the female version.

=== Female Shepard ===
Although female Shepard is less popular with players compared to her male counterpart, the character and her voice actress has consistently been well received critically. Hale was nominated for "Best Performance By A Human Female" at the 2010 Spike Video Game Awards, though lost to fellow Mass Effect voice actor Tricia Helfer (playing Sarah Kerrigan in StarCraft II: Wings of Liberty). Polygon included Jane Shepard, the default name for a female Shepard, in their list of the 70 best video game characters of the 2010s decade, with Cass Marshall singling out Hale's voice acting for convincingly selling her character as "both a deadly space marine and a vulnerable protagonist facing impossible odds". Various media outlets like CNET, ONE37pm and CBR have included Commander Shepard in their lists of top female video game characters.

The outcome of the design poll, which was initially won by the blonde Shepard, was described as controversial and proved divisive with critics. While commentators like Kirk Hamilton from Kotaku accepted what he perceived to be a legitimately democratic choice, others like Kim Richards from PC Gamer rejected the outcome. Richards in particular criticized the poll for encouraging players to go for the most "Barbie-like" conventionally attractive appearance.

Carlen Lavigne's later analysis of the controversy concluded that the poll was presented like a beauty contest, which positioned Shepard in a sexualized manner for the pleasure of a straight male audience; this has a corrupting effect on Shepard's standing as a feminist lead, even though the original intention is to promote a female character as the face of the franchise. The authors of Bridging Game Studies and Feminist Theories noted that the poll produced "six avatars who have the exact same body shape, but are distinguished by different skin, hair, and eye colour." From their point of view, Shepard would either way "fit perfectly with beauty standards while creating the illusion of choice for players." Leandro Lima noted that the manner in which Shepard was included within the marketing campaign for Mass Effect 3 was still problematic for many players, as she is "perceived as very generic in terms of design". Patricia Hernandez from Polygon felt that the manner which the female Shepard poll unfolded was "strange" and that BioWare's attempts to continue modifying her years after the release of the first game while her male counterpart's appearance remains unchanged is somewhat "off-putting". Nevertheless, she expressed relief that "in 2021, there's no vote, no massive fan campaign to get BioWare to even consider highlighting FemShep" in response to the character's prominence in promotional material released for Mass Effect Legendary Edition.

== See also ==
- Hawke (Dragon Age), another BioWare player character who is customizable to a certain degree
