= Mass Effect (video game) =

2007 video game

- Developer: BioWare (Note: Ported to Windows by Demiurge Studios and to PlayStation 3 by Edge of Reality.)
- Publisher: Microsoft Game Studios (Note: Electronic Arts published the PlayStation 3 version.)
- Director: Casey Hudson
- Designer: Preston Watamaniuk
- Programmer: David Falkner
- Artist: Derek Watts
- Writer: Drew Karpyshyn
- Composers: Jack Wall; Sam Hulick; Richard Jacques; David Kates
- Series: Mass Effect
- Engine: Unreal Engine 3
- Platforms: Xbox 360; Windows; PlayStation 3
- Release: November 20, 2007: Xbox 360; NA: November 20, 2007; AU: November 22, 2007; EU: November 23, 2007 Windows; NA: May 28, 2008; AU: June 5, 2008; EU: June 6, 2008 PlayStation 3; NA: December 4, 2012; EU: December 7, 2012
- Genre: Action role-playing
- Mode: Single-player

Mass Effect is a 2007 action role-playing game developed by BioWare and published by Microsoft Game Studios for the Xbox 360. It is the first game in the Mass Effect series, and takes place within the Milky Way galaxy in the year 2183, where civilization is threatened by a highly advanced machine race known as the Reapers. The player assumes the role of Commander Shepard, an elite human soldier who must stop a rogue agent from carrying out the Reapers' galactic invasion. The game involves completing multiple quests that generally involve space exploration, squad and vehicular combat, and interaction with non-player characters.

Planned as the first chapter of a trilogy, Mass Effect was developed over the course of three and a half years, and uses the Unreal Engine 3 as a groundwork. It was designed so that the player would assume the role of a central character that could make important decisions and impact the story of the game in numerous ways. The combat was designed to offer the tactics and customization of a role-playing game, but through a simpler and real-time third-person shooter interface. In 2008 and 2009, two downloadable content packs that introduced new missions to the base game were released.

Mass Effect received critical acclaim, and sold over one and a half million copies by January 2008. Critics praised the game's interactive storytelling and cinematic design, but criticized its unbalanced combat mechanics and poor artificial intelligence. The game received several year-end awards, including Best RPG at the 2007 Spike Video Game Awards and Roleplaying Game of the Year at the 11th Annual Interactive Achievement Awards, and is considered one of the greatest video games of all time. Following the release for the Xbox 360, Mass Effect was ported to Windows by Demiurge Studios and Microsoft Game Studios in 2008, and later on, to PlayStation 3 by Edge of Reality and Electronic Arts in 2012. It was followed by the sequels Mass Effect 2 in 2010 and Mass Effect 3 in 2012. In 2021, Mass Effect was remastered as part of the Mass Effect Legendary Edition.

== Gameplay ==
Mass Effect is a single-player action role-playing game in which the player takes the role of Commander Shepard from a third-person perspective. Shepard's gender, appearance, military background, combat-training and first name are determined by the player before the game begins. There are six different character classes for the player to choose from and each of them have different talents that provide enhanced combat capabilities. For example, the Soldier class is trained in weapon damage and has improved health, while the Sentinel class is trained in protecting and healing allies. At one point in the game, players may evolve their base class talent into one of two specializations, which depend on the class chosen by the player. Although any class can use any weapon type, each class is only effective with the weapons they are trained in.

The game's overworld is a galaxy map that the player can explore to find and complete quests. Most of the quests that progress the story consist of combat missions, while optional quests generally involve the player gathering items or interacting with non-player characters. As the player progresses throughout the game, six squad members become available, each with their own talents that can be developed. Experience points are gained in multiple ways, such as completing quests, defeating enemies, or finding and collecting items around the environment. Each time a sufficient amount of experience is obtained, the player "levels up" and is awarded a number of Talent Points that can be used to develop talents for both Shepard and the members of the squad. Each talent has 12 ranks that can be unlocked, with each rank costing one Talent Point.

The player's primary mode of transportation is a starship which serves as Shepard's base of operations. Aboard the ship, the player can interact with the squad members, buy new equipment, and travel to numerous planetary systems. Although the game features a large number of planets for the player to examine, only a few of them can actually be landed on and explored. Some of them can also be surveyed to search for valuable resources and quest-relevant items. Upon landing on a planet, the player can traverse on foot or by using an all-terrain infantry fighting vehicle called the M35 Mako. Most of the game's main quests are geared toward on-foot combat, but some segments may feature combat requiring the use of the M35 Mako. In contrast, secondary quests usually require the player to explore free-roam uncharted worlds with the vehicle. Equipment items, which include armor, weapon, and ammunition upgrades, can be found around the environment or purchased from merchants in settlements.

=== Combat ===
In combat, the player can pause the action to display the squad's user interface and calmly select different powers for the squad members to use. The squad's health bars and shields are displayed at the bottom left corner of the screen.

Combat in Mass Effect is squad-based and two squad members accompany the player on the battlefield. The player has direct control of Shepard while the squad members are controlled by the game's artificial intelligence. Battles take place in real-time, but the player can pause the action at any time to calmly target enemies and select different talent abilities for the squad members to use. The game uses an over the shoulder perspective akin to a third-person shooter, and features a cover system which allows players to strategically hide behind objects while fighting enemy forces. The player may also issue orders to the squad members, such as sending them to take cover behind an object, scout ahead, regroup, or focus their fire on a designated target.

Weapons range from pistols to shotguns, assault rifles, and sniper rifles. Although all of them have unlimited ammunition, they overheat if fired continuously for prolonged periods. In addition, the player can use grenades which latch onto targets or flat surfaces to be remotely detonated. Shepard and the squad members are protected by a health bar and damage-absorbing shields. The health bar only takes damage once the shields have been destroyed, but environmental hazards like heat or toxic agents may directly affect the health bar if they are not negated entirely by wearing appropriate armor. The health bar can be restored with the use of items called Medi-gels, while shields automatically regenerate when not taking fire for a brief period. Some talents and equipment items can improve the healing rate or shield regeneration. The player can revive fallen squad members with the use of the Unity talent. However, if Shepard dies, the player must start the game again from the last saved point.

=== Dialogue and morality ===
During conversations with characters, Mass Effect employs a radial command menu, called Dialogue Wheel, where the player's dialogue options depend on wheel direction. The left side of the wheel is normally reserved for options that will continue the conversation in depth, while options on the right side tend to move the conversation towards completion. Responses at the top are generally more polite and selfless, while those at the bottom are more aggressive and hostile. Dialogue choices impact how others react to Shepard and affect the player's chosen morality. Morality is measured by Paragon (charm) and Renegade (intimidate) points. These points allow the player to develop talents that affect the availability of new special Paragon and Renegade dialogue options with significant impact in the game.

== Synopsis ==
=== Setting and characters ===
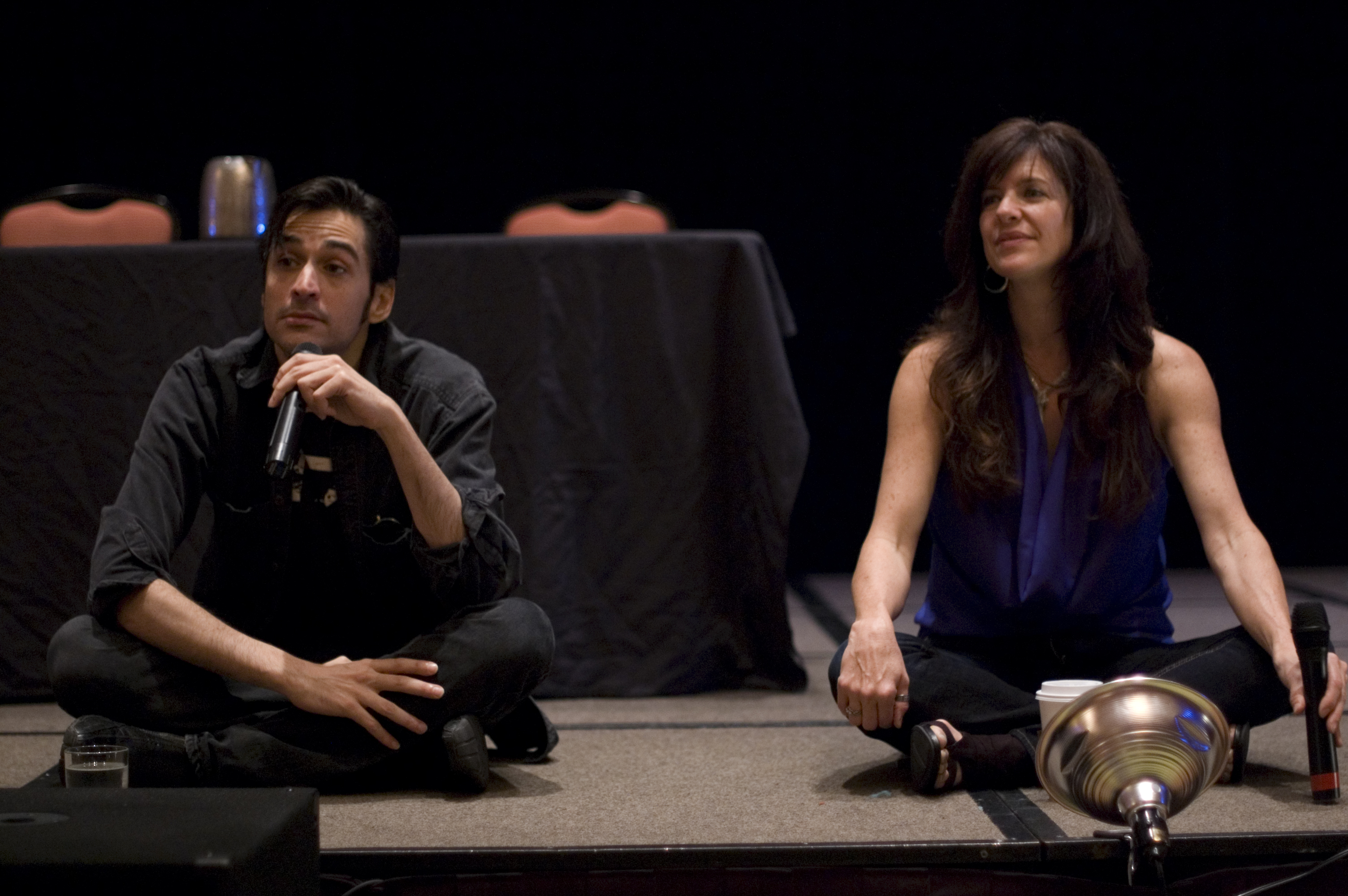
Mark Meer (left) and Jennifer Hale (right) provided the voices for the male and female protagonist of the game.

Mass Effect is set within the Milky Way galaxy in the year 2183 where interstellar travel is possible through the use of mass transit devices called Mass Relays, a technology believed to have been built by an extinct alien race known as the Protheans. The term "Mass Effect" is defined as a form of mass-negating technology, allowing the creation of physics phenomena, like artificial gravity or FTL travel. A conglomerate body of governments known as the Citadel Council controls a large percentage of the galaxy and is responsible for maintaining law and order among races of the galactic community. Races that belong to the Citadel Council include humans, asari, salarians, and turians. Other alien races seen in the game include the reptilian krogan, the environmental suited quarians, and a hostile race of networked artificial intelligences called geth. Humanity is represented by the Systems Alliance, an organized body that joined the galactic community in 2157.

The protagonist of the game is Commander Shepard (voiced by Mark Meer or Jennifer Hale), a graduate of the Systems Alliance special forces program and a candidate to become the first human member of the Special Tactics and Reconnaissance (Spectre) force, agents given broad authority by the Citadel Council to protect the galaxy. Shepard's squad members include human Systems Alliance marine Kaidan Alenko (Raphael Sbarge), human Systems Alliance soldier Ashley Williams (Kimberly Brooks), turian Citadel Security officer Garrus Vakarian (Brandon Keener), krogan mercenary Urdnot Wrex (Steven Barr), quarian mechanic Tali'Zorah (Ash Sroka), and asari exoarchaeologist Liara T'Soni (Ali Hillis). Other characters include SSV Normandy captain David Anderson (Keith David) and Normandy's pilot Jeff "Joker" Moreau (Seth Green).

=== Plot ===
Shepard and Kaidan are sent to the human colony of Eden Prime to recover an unearthed Prothean beacon. They repel an attack by the geth, rescuing Ashley in the process, though Corporal Jenkins is killed. Saren Arterius, a rogue turian Spectre, activates the beacon before escaping. Shepard reaches the beacon and receives a vision of war and death. The SSV Normandy and its crew are summoned by Ambassador Donnel Udina to the Citadel Station, but Shepard is unable to convince the Citadel Council of Saren's treason without solid evidence. Shepard rescues Tali, who possesses a recording of a conversation between Saren and asari Matriarch Benezia. The two discuss their victory while also mentioning an artifact called the "Conduit" and the return of the Reapers, a highly advanced machine race of synthetic-organic starships believed to eradicate organic civilizations every 50,000 years. The Council revokes Saren's Spectre status and makes Shepard the first human Spectre. Given command of the Normandy by Anderson, Shepard begins to follow leads provided by him and Udina in pursuit of Saren.

On the planet Therum, Shepard rescues Benezia's daughter Liara T'Soni, who joins Shepard's squad and provides better understanding of the vision from the beacon. On the colony of Feros, Shepard acquires the ability to comprehend and interpret the images seen in the vision from a former subordinate of Benezia, and learns that Saren's flagship, Sovereign, possesses unique mind-control capabilities. On the world of Noveria, Shepard tracks down and defeats Benezia, who reveals that she and Saren are being indoctrinated by Sovereign. Meanwhile, the Council informs Shepard that a salarian infiltration unit has uncovered Saren's main base on Virmire. After learning that Saren has discovered a cure for the krogan genetic disease, the Genophage, and plans to breed an army of krogan warriors, Shepard decides to assist the salarians in destroying the base by planting a bomb. If recruited, Wrex confronts Shepard over whether to destroy it, which results in him either standing down or being executed.

Inside the base, Shepard is confronted by Sovereign, who reveals itself to be a Reaper. Sovereign reveals that the Reapers remain outside the galaxy waiting for organic life to develop and discover the Mass Relays, before harvesting them when they reach their peak of advancement. Afterwards, Shepard must choose between saving Ashley or Kaidan, who are both pinned down, before encountering Saren, who claims that his allegiance to Sovereign will save organic life forms by demonstrating their usefulness to the Reapers. On the Normandy, Liara pinpoints the Conduit's location: a Prothean world known as Ilos. Shepard presents this information to the Council, who dismiss the need for a mission to Ilos and instead opt to reinforce the military presence around the citadel in anticipation of Saren's offensive. Relieved of command of the Normandy by Udina, Shepard is approached by Anderson who offers Shepard a chance to steal the spacecraft and pursue Saren to Ilos.

On Ilos, Shepard learns from a Prothean virtual intelligence (VI) named Vigil that the Citadel is actually an enormous Mass Relay that the Reapers use to invade the galaxy. A few Protheans survived the last extinction cycle via cryopreservation on Ilos and then re-entered the Citadel via the Conduit, a reverse-engineered miniature Mass Relay disguised aboard the station as a statue. The Protheans sabotaged the Citadel to prevent the Reapers from remotely activating it, which Saren plans to undo in order to trigger the Reaper invasion. Meanwhile, as Shepard had warned, Saren and Sovereign invade the Citadel, catching the defending fleets off guard and threatening the safety of the Council members.

After fighting through geth forces at the Conduit, Shepard confronts Saren at the Citadel. Saren is either killed by Shepard or convinced to commit suicide. The Destiny Ascension, the Citadel's flagship with the Council on board, then requests assistance; Shepard must either risk Alliance reinforcements to save them, or sacrifice the Destiny Ascension and send the reinforcements to pursue Sovereign. Sovereign then reanimates and possesses Saren's corpse to attack Shepard, while fighting off Citadel forces. Eventually, Saren's corpse is destroyed, incapacitating Sovereign and allowing it to be dispatched by the Alliance. For prevailing, humanity is either invited to join the Council if it was saved, or becomes its new leader if it was left to perish. After either Anderson or Udina assumes this new leadership position, Shepard leaves the proceedings, vowing to end the Reaper threat.

== Development ==
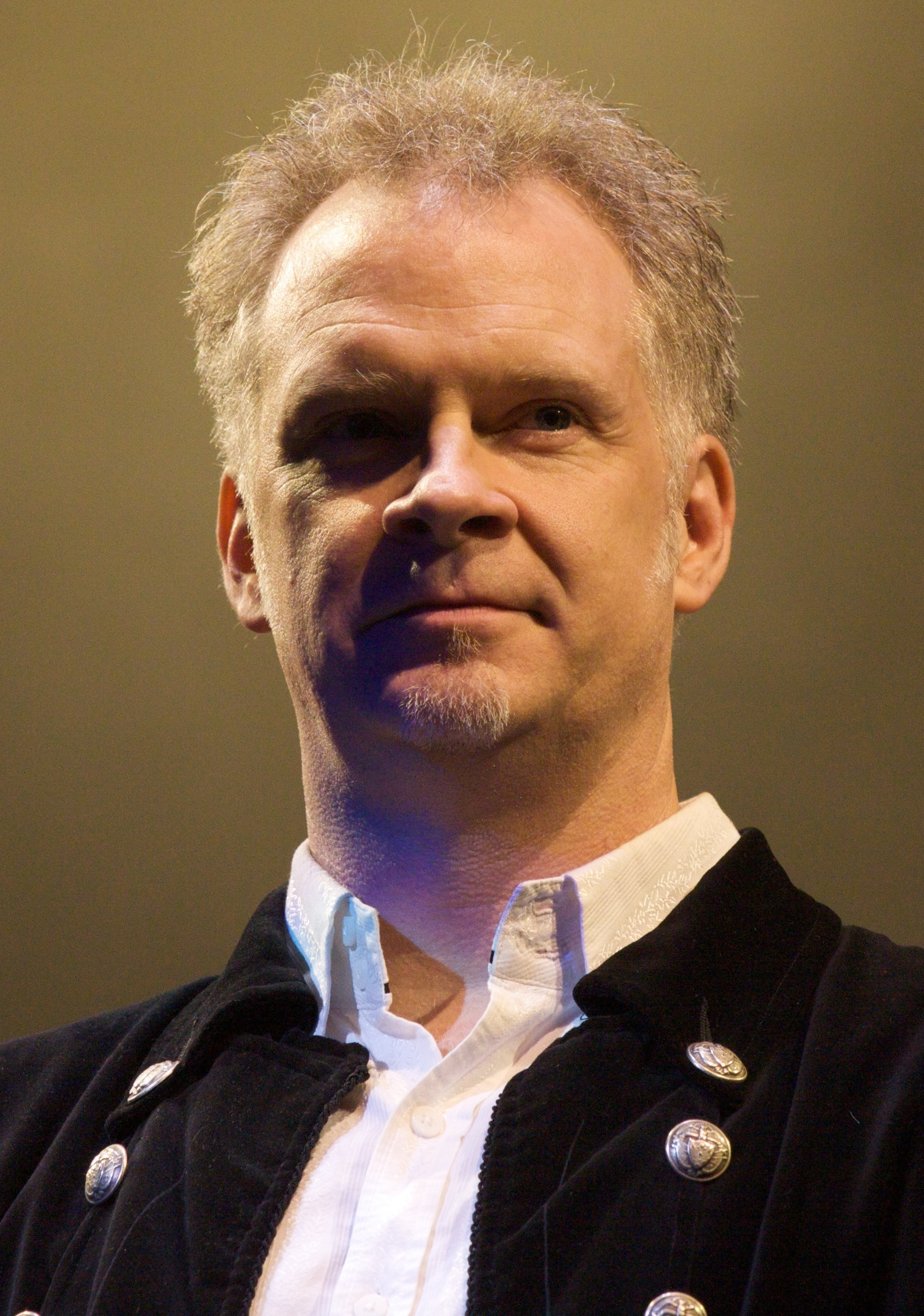
Jack Wall was the main composer of Mass Effect.

Mass Effect was developed by BioWare and directed by Casey Hudson, who previously directed BioWare's 2003 title Star Wars: Knights of the Old Republic. Preproduction of the game began in early 2004, shortly after the Microsoft Windows version of Knights of the Old Republic was released. As the development team was already experienced with the Xbox console, they decided to develop the game originally for its successor, the Xbox 360, due to its improved processing power and development tools. A total of 130 people were involved in the development of the game and the first six to eight months were spent conceiving how the game would look. Mass Effect uses the Unreal Engine 3 as a groundwork, but on top of that the team developed additional components for advanced digital actors, space exploration, and squad combat, resulting in BioWare's largest programming project at the time. During the game's three- to four-year development cycle, most of the time had been devoted to the development of these technologies.

Because BioWare wanted to create a memorable story, Mass Effect was envisioned as the first chapter of a trilogy from the very beginning, and having a considerable technological basis would help shorten the development cycle of its future sequels. Instead of designing a role-playing game where the player would control a blank protagonist, the developers wanted players to assume the role of a central character that would have to make important decisions. According to Hudson, this approach would allow them to create a unique "level of intensity and cinematic power", while at the same time give the player the same role-playing customization as previous BioWare games. Choices and consequences were a high priority, as developers did not want players to follow a pre-determined path. Due to the game's numerous dialogue options, the dialogue wheel was created to help players identify which responses belong to certain emotions. The use of digital actors allowed developers to create conversations where characters would speak by using facial expressions and body movement.

Hudson explained that they wanted to evolve the pseudo-turn-based combat of Knights of the Old Republic into a real-time third-person shooter interface. The combat was meant to offer the tactics and customization of a role-playing game, but through a simpler and more intuitive user interface. It was also designed so that players would not need to press many buttons to pull off the squad's different attack combinations. The team worked closely with Microsoft on several elements of the interface to make sure the combat was tactical enough, and went through a lot of trial and error to balance the combat between role-playing game and shooter.

Creating a great sense of discovery was a major goal. Developers wanted the game to feature an actual galaxy that could be explored beyond the core story locations. A very large team manually built several parts of the galaxy, and they were able to expand the playable space significantly by using internally developed tools. Classic space exploration games such as Starflight and Star Control were cited as a major inspiration. These encouraged the team to create the M35 Mako for exploring the game's uncharted worlds and develop game mechanics to survey planets from space. Star Control II would also be an inspiration for their writing and character design.

Drew Karpyshyn, who previously served as a senior writer for Knights of the Old Republic, was the lead writer for Mass Effect. Despite the fact that each of the game's planets had one primary writer, all of the writers involved in the production had to review each other's work and offer criticism. This process of collaborative feedback and individual effort is common at BioWare, and it behooved Karpyshyn to make sure the style was consistent across all different areas. One of the biggest challenges the writers faced was the amount of volume they were required to write to support the game's multiple dialogue paths and story outcomes. It took them three years to get everything into the game, which featured about 400,000 words and more than 20,000 lines of spoken dialogue. According to Karpyshyn, this is roughly the equivalent of 20 movies or 4-5 full novels.

Films such as Star Wars, Alien, Star Trek II: The Wrath of Khan, Blade Runner, Starship Troopers, and especially Final Fantasy: The Spirits Within, were major influences on the atmosphere and artistic qualities of the game. The team chose Jack Wall, who also penned the music for BioWare's 2005 title Jade Empire, as the main composer of Mass Effect due to his ability to produce a wide range of musical styles. Hudson had a clear idea of what kind of music he wanted in the game, but gave Wall certain artistic freedom to express himself. According to Wall, the main vision was to "marry the electronic instrument palatte [sic] of the late 70's/early 80's with more organic elements." Wall had never written this style of music before, but composer Sam Hulick helped him develop the electronic sound on a classic orchestral foundation. By the end of the project, composers Richard Jacques and David Kates joined Wall and Hulick to finish the score on time. While a total of 110 minutes of music was written for the game, all in-game and cinematic music was crafted as multiple stems to maximize their use and variety. The game went gold on October 22, 2007.

== Marketing and release ==
Mass Effect was officially announced at the X05 trade show in Amsterdam on October 4, 2005, as an Xbox 360 exclusive. In May 2006, a demo of the game was presented at the Electronic Entertainment Expo (E3) and subsequently won Best Role Playing Game at the Game Critics Awards. IGN editors awarded the game for Best Graphics Technology and Most Innovative Design at their Best of E3 2006 Awards. They also listed it as one of the most anticipated games of 2007. New features of the game were detailed at the X06 trade show in Barcelona in September 2006, while the first hour of gameplay was shown at the Game Developers Conference in San Francisco in March 2007. Mass Effect was then presented at E3 in July 2007, where it received Game Critics Awards for Best Console Game and Best Role Playing Game, and at the Games Convention in Leipzig, Germany in August 2007. The game's release date was announced on August 30, 2007. If the game was pre-ordered at certain retailers in Australia, players could receive a complimentary bonus disc which included a five-minute behind-the-scenes documentary, tracks from the game's soundtrack, and a number of trailers.

Mass Effect was released for the Xbox 360 on November 20, 2007, in North America. However, the street date was broken in Australia on November 16, 2007, by EB Games, which received copies of the game early and took it as a sign to begin distributing. The game was released in both Standard and Limited Collector's Edition format. The Limited Collector's Edition included a bonus disc of exclusive Mass Effect background material, a soundtrack, and design galleries featuring more than 600 pieces of artwork with full audio commentaries. A soundtrack album titled Mass Effect Original Soundtrack, which features 37 tracks of the game and covers a duration of 1:15:59, was released in conjunction with the game. The album includes the song "M4 (Part II)" by Canadian electronic rock band Faunts, which is featured in the game during the end credits.

A Microsoft Windows version ported by Demiurge Studios was released on May 28, 2008 by Microsoft Game Studios. This version features optimized controls designed specifically for personal computers, high-resolution graphics, a new user interface, and other minor changes. Microsoft initially intended to use SecuROM, a digital rights management software which would require online activation after installation and additional authentication checks every ten days. However, the company ultimately decided not to use it after listening to criticism from fans. In 2012, Mass Effect was ported to Sony's PlayStation 3 console by Edge of Reality and Electronic Arts, featuring lighting and visual effects improvements. It was released digitally on the PlayStation Network and as part of the Mass Effect Trilogy compilation. In 2015, Mass Effect was added to the list of backward compatible Xbox 360 games on Xbox One. In 2021, Mass Effect was remastered as part of the Mass Effect Legendary Edition.

=== Downloadable content ===
Mass Effect features two downloadable content packs. The first pack, Bring Down the Sky, was released as a paid download for the Xbox 360 on March 10, 2008, and as a free download for Microsoft Windows on May 28, 2008. The pack is included in the PlayStation 3 version of the game, which was released on December 4, 2012. Bring Down the Sky introduces a new mission where the player must explore an asteroid using the Mako and prevent it from striking an Earth-like planet. It also includes a new alien race, the batarians, and additional side-quest content. According to BioWare, the adventure takes 90 minutes to complete. Ryan Geddes of IGN highlighted the pack's included extras and "stunning" visuals, while Dan Whitehead of Eurogamer criticized its lack of narrative weight and reuse of outpost maps that are also available in the base game. Bring Down the Sky was remastered as part of Mass Effect Legendary Edition.

The second pack, Pinnacle Station, was developed by Demiurge Studios. It was released as a paid download for the Xbox 360 and as a free download for Microsoft Windows on August 25, 2009. The pack introduces a training facility where the player can compete in eight virtual reality combat scenarios, divided into four different game types like Deathmatch and Capture the flag. After beating the combat scenarios, the player needs to complete four more to unlock a special survival mode, which is the same as the previous survival challenges but requires players to last five minutes. Pinnacle Station was not included in the Mass Effect Legendary Edition of the game due to a loss of its source code.

== Reception ==
=== Critical response ===
Reception

Aggregate score
Aggregator	Score
Metacritic	91/100 (X360); 89/100 (PC); 85/100 (PS3)

Review scores
Publication	Score
1Up.com	A
Computer and Video Games	9/10
Edge	7/10
Eurogamer	8/10
Game Informer	9.75/10
GamePro	4.75/5
GameSpot	9/10 (PC); 8.5/10 (X360)
GameSpy	5/5
GameTrailers	9.6/10
IGN	9.2/10 (PC); 9/10 (PS3); 9.4/10 (X360)
Maximum PC	9/10
Official Xbox Magazine (US)	10/10
GameCritics.com	10/10

Upon release, Mass Effect received critical acclaim from video game publications. The game's interactive storytelling and cinematic design were highlighted very positively, while the combat and vehicle navigation were generally seen as the game's weakest features. Kevin VanOrd of GameSpot described Mass Effect as "a great game with moments of brilliance and a number of small but significant obstacles that hold it back from reaching its true potential." Similarly, IGN's Erik Brudvig considered it greater than the sum of its parts, stating that although Mass Effect features numerous technical issues, most of the game "is so expertly delivered that it can transcend its weaknesses."

Writing for Game Informer, Andrew Reiner said that the game's interactive storytelling encourages replay and that its detailed story "makes the relationships feel real—you care about your crew, and you really feel like you have a voice that resonates throughout the galaxy." Alex Dale of CVG stated similar pros, stating that "never before has storytelling been so competently ingrained into a videogame, and never before has a player had so much freedom to dictate the course of a linear storyline." Similar praise was given to the game's detailed character models, facial animations, and voice acting. Jennifer Tsao of 1UP.com felt the digital actors evoked real-life expressions, but admitted that the lip sync had some issues. Although the visuals were credited for their dramatic set pieces and evocative soundtrack, critics noted the game's inconsistent frame rate and long loading times.

Cameron Lewis of GamePro praised the game's story, depth, and presentation, while Paul Curthoys of Official Xbox Magazine remarked that the game "bothers with emotions and moments that most games don't concern themselves with", describing it as "a great science-fiction novel in video game form." In contrast, Edge concluded that the space opera setting failed to provide "the myth and exotica to adequately follow Star Wars". The publication also criticized the cast of characters and overall tone, saying that Mass Effect "strives so hard to be taken seriously that it winds up feeling relentlessly dour." Kristan Reed of Eurogamer noted the game's slow start and overwhelming setting, observing that it would confuse players before they know what the main game is about.

The combat was generally criticized for its unbalanced mechanics and poor artificial intelligence of the squad members. Edge commented that the game's role-playing elements did not blend well with its action, while IGN criticized the squad mechanics for not having enough weight, stating that the squad members "are quite often no more useful than cannon fodder to draw the enemy away from you." The inventory management was also a subject of criticism, with 1UP.com describing it as painful and tedious. The galaxy exploration was favorably compared to the 1986 adventure game Starflight and the number of optional missions was highlighted positively, but the Mako sections were disparaged for their rocky planetary design and clumsy combat mechanics. The Microsoft Windows and PlayStation 3 versions of the game received similar criticism to the Xbox 360 version.

=== Sales ===
In the United States, Mass Effect debuted at #6 on The NPD Group's video game sales chart for November 2007, with sales of 473,000 copies. The simExchange had previously forecast 328,000 sales for the period. By the following month, the game was absent from NPD's top 10. Mass Effect proceeded to sell over one million units worldwide within fewer than three weeks on shelves, according to Microsoft vice president Jeff Bell. Sales rose to 1.6 million copies after six weeks of availability, and VentureBeat's Dean Takahashi noted in March 2008 that the game was "expected to cross 2 million in sales, generating an estimated $120 million". In November 2008, the game's Xbox 360 version received a "Gold" certification from the Entertainment and Leisure Software Publishers Association, indicating lifetime sales of at least 200,000 copies in the United Kingdom. In April 2011, it was reported that both Mass Effect and its sequel have combined sold more than seven million units worldwide.

=== Accolades ===
Mass Effect received several year-end awards, including Best RPG at the 2007 Spike Video Game Awards, Role-Playing Game of the Year at the 11th Annual Interactive Achievement Awards, and Best RPG at the IGN Best of 2007 Awards. In addition, The New York Times selected Mass Effect as its Game of the Year. In 2008, 'IGN editors ranked the game number 1 on their list of Top 25 Xbox 360 games.

List of awards and nominations

Year	Award	Category	Recipient	Result	Ref.
2007	Spike Video Game Awards	Game of the Year	Mass Effect	Nominated	
2007	Spike Video Game Awards	Best RPG	Mass Effect	Won	
2007	Spike Video Game Awards	Best Graphics	Mass Effect	Nominated	
2007	Spike Video Game Awards	Best Xbox 360 Game	Mass Effect	Nominated	
2007	Spike Video Game Awards	Best Original Score	Mass Effect	Nominated	
2007	TeamXbox Game of the Year Awards	Best Role-Playing Game of the Year	Mass Effect	Won	
2007	TeamXbox Game of the Year Awards	Best Story of the Year	Mass Effect	Won	
2007	TeamXbox Game of the Year Awards	Game of the Year	Mass Effect	Won	
2007	IGN Best of 2007 Awards	Best RPG (Xbox 360)	Mass Effect	Won	
2007	IGN Best of 2007 Awards	Best Artistic Design (Xbox 360)	Mass Effect	Nominated	
2007	IGN Best of 2007 Awards	Best End Credit Song (Xbox 360)	Mass Effect	Nominated	
2007	IGN Best of 2007 Awards	Best Story (Xbox 360)	Mass Effect	Won	
2007	IGN Best of 2007 Awards	Xbox 360 Game of the Year	Mass Effect	Nominated	
2007	IGN Best of 2007 Awards	Best RPG (Overall)	Mass Effect	Won	
2007	IGN Best of 2007 Awards	Best Artistic Design (Overall)	Mass Effect	Nominated	
2007	IGN Best of 2007 Awards	Best Original Score (Overall)	Mass Effect	Won	
2007	IGN Best of 2007 Awards	Best Use of Sound (Overall)	Mass Effect	Nominated	
2007	IGN Best of 2007 Awards	Best Story (Overall)	Mass Effect	Won	
2007	IGN Best of 2007 Awards	Best Developer (Overall)	BioWare	Nominated	
2007	IGN Best of 2007 Awards	Overall Game of the Year	Mass Effect	Nominated	
2008	11th Annual Interactive Achievement Awards	Role-Playing Game of the Year	Mass Effect	Won	
2008	11th Annual Interactive Achievement Awards	Console Game of the Year	Mass Effect	Nominated	
2008	11th Annual Interactive Achievement Awards	Outstanding Achievement in Story Development	Mass Effect	Nominated	
2008	11th Annual Interactive Achievement Awards	Outstanding Character Performance	Mass Effect	Nominated	
2008	8th Annual Game Developers Choice Awards	Innovation Award	Mass Effect	Nominated	
2008	8th Annual Game Developers Choice Awards	Audio	Mass Effect	Nominated	
2008	8th Annual Game Developers Choice Awards	Game Design	Mass Effect	Nominated	
2008	8th Annual Game Developers Choice Awards	Writing	Mass Effect	Nominated	
2008	IGN Best of 2008 Awards	Best RPG (PC)	Mass Effect	Nominated	
2008	IGN Best of 2008 Awards	Best Original Score (PC)	Mass Effect	Won	
2008	IGN Best of 2008 Awards	Best Voice Acting (PC)	Mass Effect	Nominated	
2008	IGN Best of 2008 Awards	Best Story (PC)	Mass Effect	Won	
2009	12th Annual Interactive Achievement Awards	Computer Game of the Year	Mass Effect	Nominated	
2009	5th British Academy Games Awards	Story and Character	Mass Effect	Nominated	

=== Conservative reactions to alleged obscenity ===
Mass Effect has an optional subplot where the player can develop a romantic relationship with a non-player character. If the relationship becomes more intimate, a cutscene containing partial nudity and sexual activity is shown. The scene first came under scrutiny in an article by neoconservative blogger Kevin McCullough, who employed statements such as "Mass Effect can be customized to sodomise whatever, whomever, however, the game player wishes", and "with its over the net capabilities virtual orgasmic rape is just the push of a button away." The article was criticized by the gaming community and long-time anti-obscenity campaigner Jack Thompson, who said that "this contrived controversy is absolutely ridiculous." Although McCullough ultimately issued an apology, he still considered the material offensive.

Similarly, a Fox News program by Martha MacCallum discussed the sexual content of the game. MacCallum stated that the game "leaves nothing to the imagination" and features the ability for players to "engage in full graphic sex." Self-proclaimed psychology specialist Cooper Lawrence and video game journalist Geoff Keighley were also interviewed. Lawrence described sexual content in video games as teaching their active users to consider women as objects of desire valued solely for their sexuality. She added that the game's player character is a man who decides how many women he wants to be with. Keighley focused on challenging the accuracy of her statements and asked her if she actually played the game, to which she responded "No". BioWare's parent company Electronic Arts requested a correction from Fox News, but they simply responded that the company had been offered a chance to appear on the channel.

After watching someone play the game for about two-and-a-half hours, Lawrence eventually retracted her earlier statements. She added that she had been told the game was similar to pornography, and noted that she "has seen episodes of Lost that are more sexually explicit." In the interim, largely as a reaction from an offended gaming community, her latest book attracted many customer reviews on Amazon which rated it one star out of five. Many of these reviews satirically noted that they had not read her book, but heard from someone else that the book was bad, and thus voted low.

Mass Effect was banned in Singapore for a short time before it was lifted with an M18 rating. Censors in the country said that a scene with an alien and human female caressing was the main reason why the game was not allowed to be sold in video game stores.

== Sequel ==
Since Mass Effect was planned as the first chapter of a trilogy, development of a sequel began shortly before the game was released. The sequel, entitled Mass Effect 2, was released for Windows and Xbox 360 in a partnership between BioWare and Microsoft Game Studios with Electronic Arts on January 26, 2010, and for PlayStation 3 on January 18, 2011. With the import of a completed saved game of the original Mass Effect, the player can impact the story of Mass Effect 2 in numerous ways. The sequel was a critical success and received multiple year-end awards, including Game of the Year at the 14th Annual Interactive Achievement Awards by the Academy of Interactive Arts & Sciences, and Best Game at the 7th British Academy Games Awards by the British Academy of Film and Television Arts.
