= Friendly Fire Recordings =

- Founded: 2004
- Founder: Dan Koplowitz
- Distributors: Redeye (US); Outside Music (Canada); IODA (digital)
- Genre: Indie rock
- Country of origin: U.S.
- Location: Brooklyn, New York
- Official website: www.friendlyfirerecordings.com

Friendly Fire Recordings is an independent record label based in Brooklyn that was founded by Dan Koplowitz in 2004. Bands under the label include Asobi Seksu, Faunts and David & the Citizens. Friendly Fire is distributed in the United States by Redeye Distribution and in Canada by Outside Music. The digital distribution is handled by Independent Online Distribution Alliance.

== Artists ==
- Asobi Seksu
- Camphor
- David & the Citizens
- Elk City
- Faunts
- The Old Soul
- The Whitsundays
- Treefight for Sunlight

== Catalog ==
- FFR-001 - Asobi Seksu - Asobi Seksu (2004)
- FFR-002 - Faunts - High Expectations/Low Results (2005)
- FFR-003 - David & the Citizens - David & the Citizens EP (2005)
- FFR-004 - Asobi Seksu - Citrus (2006)
- FFR-005 - David & the Citizens - Until the Sadness is Gone (2006)
- FFR-006 - Elk City - New Believers (2007)
- FFR-007 - The Old Soul - The Old Soul (2007)
- FFR-008 - The Whitsundays - The Whitsundays (2008)
- FFR-009 - Camphor - Drawn to Dust (2008)
- FFR-010 - Windmill - Puddle City Racing Lights (2008)
- FFR-011 - Asobi Seksu - Citrus LP (2008)
- FFRD-001 - Faunts - M4 EP (2008) Extremely Limited Stock
- FFR-012 - Faunts - Feel.Love.Thinking.Of (2009)
- FFRD-018 - Treefight for Sunlight - A Collection of Vibrations for Your Skull (2011)

== See also ==
- List of record labels
