= Virmire =

Video game level

- Mass Effect location
- The Mako encounters Geth forces on the coastline of Virmire.
- First appearance: Mass Effect (2007)
- Created by: BioWare
- Genre: Action role-playing game

In-universe information
- Type: Planet
- Characters: Commander Shepard; Ashley Williams; Kaidan Alenko; Urdnot Wrex; Saren Arterius; Captain Kirrahe

Virmire is a level in the 2007 action role-playing game Mass Effect, developed by BioWare. Set on a tropical planet of the same name, the mission follows Commander Shepard and allied Salarian soldiers as they attack a base belonging to the rogue agent Saren Arterius. Shepard may confront squad member Urdnot Wrex over the destruction of a possible cure for the genophage, a biological weapon affecting the Krogan species, and must choose whether Ashley Williams or Kaidan Alenko will survive the mission. The level also reveals that Saren's flagship, Sovereign, is a member of the machine race known as the Reapers.

Virmire was initially designed as a holiday destination, with rock formations based on Thailand's Phi Phi Islands, before becoming a military installation. Critical discussion has focused on its plot revelations, the confrontation with Wrex and the compulsory loss of a companion. Writers have disagreed about whether the mandatory choice between Ashley and Kaidan constitutes a difficult moral dilemma or primarily depends on the player's preference for either character. The surviving character, known as the "Virmire Survivor", returns in the sequels. Academic interpretations have examined the limits of player choice and the destruction of the genophage cure.

== Level content ==
In Mass Effect, the player controls Commander Shepard, a human soldier pursuing Saren across the galaxy. The Virmire mission begins with a coastal journey in the Mako armoured vehicle, during which the player overcomes defences before reaching a Salarian reconnaissance unit led by Captain Kirrahe. The subsequent assault on Saren's base takes place on foot. Optional objectives allow the player to assist Kirrahe's unit and affect whether he survives.

Dialogue choices determine the outcome of a confrontation with squad member Wrex, if he has been recruited. Earlier actions, including recovering Wrex's family armour, and investment in Shepard's persuasion abilities affect the available responses. Later in the mission, the player must choose whether to rescue Ashley Williams or Kaidan Alenko. Neither dialogue abilities nor earlier decisions provide a way to save both.

=== Plot ===
On Virmire, Kirrahe's unit has discovered that Saren is breeding an army of Krogan and has apparently cured the genophage, which drastically reduces the number of viable Krogan births. Kirrahe proposes destroying the facility with a nuclear device. If Wrex has been recruited, he objects to destroying a possible cure for his species. The confrontation can end with Wrex supporting the attack or being killed by Shepard and/or Ashley.

Shepard assigns Ashley or Kaidan to accompany Kirrahe's diversionary force while the other helps deploy the bomb. Shepard's team attacks the base as the Salarians draw away its defenders. Inside the facility, Shepard encounters research into indoctrination, a process through which the Reapers control other beings, and communicates with Sovereign. The ship reveals that it is itself a Reaper and that the Reapers repeatedly destroy advanced galactic civilisations.

After the bomb is placed, the squad member accompanying the Salarians requests help. Geth forces then attack the bomb site, leaving both Ashley and Kaidan in danger. Shepard fights Saren and escapes with the chosen squad member, leaving the other to die in the nuclear explosion.

The saved character returns in Mass Effect 2 and Mass Effect 3. Ashley and Kaidan occupy largely the same place in the sequels' stories, a shared role known as the "Virmire Survivor". In Mass Effect 3, the survivor confronts Shepard during an attempted coup against the Citadel Council. Depending on earlier decisions and interactions, the survivor can be persuaded to stand down or be shot by Shepard or another squad member. Surviving the confrontation does not guarantee that the character will agree to rejoin Shepard's crew.

== Development and design ==
The Phi Phi Islands in Thailand inspired Virmire's rock formations.

Virmire was initially designed as a tropical holiday destination. Its rock formations were based on the Phi Phi Islands, with buildings attached to the rocks and connected by floating walkways. When the location became Saren's base, the designers adopted a "nautical fortress" appearance, with concrete walls and gun batteries. Floating walkways and open-air areas remained from the earlier designs.

Lead writer Drew Karpyshyn recalled technical difficulties caused by permanently removing Ashley or Kaidan, and anticipated players reconsidering their decision during the sequels.

Virmire's appearance was updated for the 2021 remaster compilation Mass Effect Legendary Edition with additional vegetation, fog and particle effects.

== Reception ==
=== Story and presentation ===
Rick Lane of bit-tech wrote that Mass Effect "really becomes Mass Effect" on Virmire. He contrasted the game's slow opening and uneven combat with the revelations about Saren's research and the Reapers. The prospect of killing a crew member, followed by the compulsory choice between two others, made the struggle against Saren more immediate for the player. Lane regarded the Suicide Mission in Mass Effect 2 and the genophage storyline in Mass Effect 3 as later uses of a template successfully established by Virmire. Courtney Kraft of Nerdist included the escape among her favourite moments in the trilogy. She singled out the confrontation with Saren and described feeling empowered when her female Shepard carried Kaidan to safety.

In her review in progress of Mass Effect Legendary Edition, Wallace of Game Informer thought the added environmental detail improved the appearance of Virmire and Eden Prime.

Statistics released by BioWare in July 2021 indicated that 60 per cent of Mass Effect Legendary Edition players saved Ashley on Virmire and 6 per cent killed Wrex.

=== The confrontation with Wrex ===
Evan Narcisse of The Atlantic connected Wrex's account of the Krogan's decline with the dispossession of Native Americans. He sympathised with Wrex's refusal to destroy a cure and suspected Ashley's hostility towards aliens contributed to her shooting him. Although he understood that his undeveloped persuasion abilities and unfinished loyalty quest explained the outcome, he remained troubled by it. Yussef Cole compared Ashley's shooting of Wrex to police violence against black Americans presented as self-defence.

Christopher Livingston of PC Gamer objected to the way the dialogue communicated the risk of Wrex's death. Because the conversation offered explicit options to shoot Wrex or signal Ashley to do so, Livingston assumed that choosing another response would avoid killing him. Ashley's intervention after he attempted to resolve the argument peacefully felt unfair to him. He reloaded an earlier save to keep Wrex alive, despite having otherwise accepted his decisions throughout the trilogy.

=== Virmire Survivor ===
James Whitbrook of Gizmodo found the compulsory sacrifice simpler than the Wrex confrontation, despite its emotional impact. Brandon Perdue, writing for Gamasutra, questioned whether it was a compelling moral dilemma. In a section titled "The Virmire Problem", he observed that either rescue produces the same military outcome, leaving the player to decide which companion to keep. He found neither character sympathetic and argued that combat usefulness and romance preferences could settle the decision before the player reached it. Perdue nevertheless allowed that losing access to a character had practical consequences and could make the choice feel substantial; he distinguished this from confronting the player with a difficult moral question.

Wes Fenlon of PC Gamer valued the decision's persistence across the trilogy, even though he disliked Kaidan and had chosen to leave him behind. He acknowledged that Ashley and Kaidan's later story arcs could be interchangeable, but appreciated that importing his saved game excluded Kaidan's dialogue and participation years after the original decision. Reloading could change which character died, but could not produce an outcome without a death. Fenlon regarded carrying either choice through the trilogy as an achievement in interactive storytelling. A GamesBeat opinion piece argued for saving Kaidan because his friendship with Shepard predates the opening mission. It also praised his refusal to support Shepard's association with Cerberus in Mass Effect 2 as an expression of his independence.

== Analysis ==
Frank G. Bosman classified the mandatory decision about Ashley and Kaidan as a "super wicked problem", a category in his account of ethical gameplay for dilemmas without a morally satisfactory solution even in hindsight. He contrasted it with disputes in Mass Effect that the player can resolve by finding an appropriate dialogue option. Although the game waits indefinitely for the player to choose, no additional dialogue or experimentation produces an outcome in which both characters live. Bosman also discussed online exchanges in which players mourned the lost character or explained their decision.

Rolf F. Nohr examined Virmire in his discussion of games as spaces of decision-making. He interpreted the rescue as a spatially staged sacrifice and compared the player's position to that of Abraham, obliged to sacrifice one of two Isaacs. Nohr argued that the desire to save both companions encounters a narrower set of possibilities already determined by the game's programming. Jan Švelch's chapter "The Virmire Survivor" in 100 Greatest Video Game Characters discusses Ashley and Kaidan's shared role in the trilogy as a testament to player choice.

In his study of biopolitics in the series, Eamon Reid distinguished Saren's cure from an attempt to free the Krogan from outside control: Saren intends to command the Krogan he breeds. Drawing on criticism by Christopher B. Patterson and Patrick Hayden, Reid argued that the confrontation excludes the possibility of destroying the facility while preserving the cure. Whether Wrex is persuaded or killed, the research must be destroyed. Reid also discussed the later consequences of Wrex's survival: he seeks to unite the Krogan and reform their society, whereas his replacement, Wreav, seeks domination and revenge against other species.
