= High Expectations/Low Results =

Studio album by Faunts
- Released: October 18, 2005
- Genre: Electronic rock; space rock; post-rock; dream pop; shoegazing
- Length: 57:57
- Label: Friendly Fire

Faunts chronology
High Expectations/Low Results (2005)	M4 (2006)

Professional ratings
Review scores
Source	Rating
Allmusic	4/5 stars
PopMatters	5/10
Tiny Mix Tapes	3/5 stars

High Expectations/Low Results is the debut album by Canadian electronic rock band Faunts. It was released on October 18, 2005 on Friendly Fire Recordings. The album had been recorded independently years earlier, but was not widely distributed until the band was signed to Friendly Fire.

== Track listing ==
No.	Title	Length
1.	"High Expectations"	3:55
2.	"Instantly Loved"	5:46
3.	"Memories of Places We've Never Been"	4:09
4.	"Place I've Found"	5:24
5.	"Parler de la Pluie et du Beau Temps"	5:49
6.	"Will You Tell Me Then"	6:37
7.	"Twenty-Three"	8:58
8.	"Gone with the Day"	12:55
9.	"Low Results"	4:24
Total length:		57:57

== Personnel ==
Faunts

- Steven Batke – vocals, guitar
- Tim Batke – vocals, guitar, keyboards
- Paul Arnusch – drums

Additional personnel

- Joel Hitchcock – keyboards
- Alanna Van Leeuwen (role not listed)

Production

- Steven Batke – engineering, mixing
- Graham Lessard, Terry Paholek – additional engineering
- Phil Demetro – mastering
