= Prison for Children =

- Genre: Drama
- Written by: Christopher Knopf
- Directed by: Larry Peerce
- Starring: John Ritter; Betty Thomas; Raphael Sbarge; Josh Brolin
- Music by: Basil Poledouris
- Country of origin: United States
- Original language: English

Production
- Cinematography: Arch Bryant
- Editor: Eric A. Sears
- Running time: 90 minutes
- Production companies: Knopf/Simons Productions; Viacom Productions

Original release
- Network: CBS
- Release: March 14, 1987

Prison for Children is a 1987 American made-for-television drama film starring John Ritter, Betty Thomas, Raphael Sbarge and Josh Brolin. Filmed in 1986, it premiered March 14, 1987, on the CBS television network.

== Plot ==
The date is May 10, 1974, and John Parsons (Raphael Sbarge) is an orphaned teenage boy living in rural New Mexico. For ten years, he has lived in a cabin on the Saunders Ranch, along with his older brother Chris, who serves as his legal guardian after the deaths of their parents. The cabin has no running water or electricity, and is heated by a wood-burning stove.

With some reluctance, Chris agrees to allow John to accompany him to round up a herd of wild mustangs, a dangerous task that Chris agreed to perform to reimburse ranch owner Bea Saunders for a horse named Friday, which she agreed to sell to him for John. Chris becomes concerned over John's recklessness when trying to break a particularly wild one, and decides to mount it himself. He manages to stay on for a few minutes until the horse throws him to the ground, causing Chris to land on his face and die instantly.

John carries Chris' lifeless body to Bea's cabin, telling her what happened. Will, the local sheriff, arrives and summons an ambulance, and offers to return John to his cabin. Bea refuses, saying she's selling the cabin, despite pleas from Will and her father to let John stay due to his age and the fact that he and Chris fixed it up over the years. She remains firm, stating that John is not her problem and that the cabin is hers. Will finally relents and tells her he'll return to take John.

John overhears this from another room and unknown to anyone, returns to the cabin on his own. He packs a bedroll and some personal items, and as he's getting ready to leave, he prepares to blow out a lit kerosene lamp on the kitchen table. In a fit of rage-fueled grief, he angrily smashes the lamp to the floor, causing a fire to break out and quickly spread throughout the cabin. He tries to escape with Friday, but Will catches up with him later and takes him into custody. Casey, one of Will's deputies, types up a confession for John to sign, but he refuses. Casey then takes a handcuffed John to a pauper's field, where a large crowd has gathered for Chris's meager county burial. While there, Casey presents John with an engraved pocket watch that Chris had intended to give him for his upcoming 16th birthday.

The sheriff returns to the Saunders ranch to try and persuade Bea to drop charges against John of felony grand larceny and willful destruction of private property, but she refuses. John is then faced with a series of unfortunate circumstances...now that he has no family left, there is no blood relation to take responsibility for him. While others have offered to take him in, the judge determines that he cannot be turned over to non-licensed foster parents, and the few who are licensed would not be willing to take him in due to the charges. With no options left, the judge reluctantly sentences him to the Sierra Mesa Industrial School for Boys, ordering him to remain there until his 18th birthday.

John and his fellow incoming inmates are introduced to David Royce (Ritter), the facility's new superintendent. Unlike his predecessors, Royce is an idealistic leader who believes that his charges are not simply hardened criminals, but also victims of circumstance like John. A teacher at the school, Angela Brannon (Thomas), shares Royce's views and they join forces to inspire change at the underfunded facility.

However, their efforts are rebuffed at every turn by legal red tape and a corrupt system. Meanwhile, John also is exposed to the real-life brutalities of prison life, such as rape, drug abuse, sadistic guards, indifferent teachers, and psychopathic inmates. John also slowly begins to lose hope for his future, much to the dismay of Brannon and Royce, who both see him as different and push hard for him to do better.

When it appears that Royce begins to succumb to the cruelties of the bureaucracy controlling the prison, he decides to come into a darkened ward with the youngest inmates one evening, and takes a seat as the boys rest. One rises from his bunk and embraces Royce, who takes him into his arms. Then one by one, more boys get up from their bunks and sits, lays or cuddles next to him, with the exception of Tyrone, a six-year-old troublemaker who refused to provide Royce with information regarding a glue-huffing incident that nearly killed two other boys aged nine and twelve. Tyrone remains in his bunk and weeps.

Fighting tears, Royce sees this as a sign that he must not give up his fight for change, and returns to his duties more determined than ever. Brannon tries one last ditch effort to redirect John back to the person he was prior to incarceration. This culminates in a showdown between John and an influential inmate nicknamed Chaser, whom Tyrone had been supplying with homemade glue that led to the earlier incident, and runs the prison population. John fights Chaser and wins, but his victory is short-lived...the incident results in an institutional transfer from Frank Bernard, the state Director of Institutions, with whom Royce has a negative history. Bernard orders John transferred to Dennison, a maximum-security facility. Royce tries to intervene, even going so far as to put in a call to the governor, but fails.

Brannon mentions to Royce that she and her brother own a ranch "on the other side of the Rockies" that needs hands, and that one who knows horses could teach the others...and that she could be back in class Monday morning. Seeing a possible way out for John, and at the risk of their careers, Royce arranges to switch the night guards overseeing John, Joey and Tom, two other inmates due to be transferred to Dennison. Royce enters John's cell and hands him a set of keys, telling him to unlock their cells at 3 and gives further instructions. When John asks him how he'll know what time it is, Royce hands him a pocket watch - the same engraved one John received at his brother's funeral.

John and Tom make it to a waiting car - and Brannon. Joey runs back to the infirmary to try and retrieve Tyrone (who was injured by Chaser and his gang over the glue incident), but he is unable to get to him and is left behind. Brannon provides John and Tom with a change of clothes and drives to the ranch. Tom hangs back, but John reaches out his hand. Tom shakes it and they walk off towards the ranch, looking back at Brannon for one last time. A voiceover from Royce says both survived and were given new names and identities, and the escape was never discovered.

== Background ==
The opening credits include the text "This picture is based on the clinical research and professional experiences of E. Kent Hayes and Alex Lazzarino." Both men co-authored the book "Find A Safe Place", on which this movie is loosely based. Hayes also authored similar works entitled "Broken Promise" and "How to Keep Your Teen from Becoming a Delinquent."

Prior to the opening credits is a voiceover stating "In 1974 Congress passed the Juvenile Justice and Delinquency Prevention Act, which had as its goal, in part, to prohibit the co-mingling of serious juvenile offenders with those accused of non-criminal offenses. Of the hundreds of thousands of children locked up in juvenile detention centers across the country annually, the majority are not charged with serious crimes, and many are not charged with any crime at all." This bill was signed into law in September 1974, about four months after the time this movie was set.
