= A Collection of Vibrations for Your Skull =

Studio album by Treefight for Sunlight
- Released: DK: 4 October 2010; UK: 14 February 2011; US: 8 November 2011
- Genre: Indie pop Sunshine pop Neo-psychedelia
- Length: 35 minutes
- Label: Tambourhinoceros (DK); Bella Union (UK); Friendly Fire Recordings (US)

Professional ratings
Review scores
Source	Rating
Allmusic	4/5 stars

A Collection of Vibrations for Your Skull is the first full-length album released by Danish indie pop band Treefight for Sunlight. It was originally released in Denmark, on 4 October 2010, by independent label Tambourhinoceros. It was released in the United Kingdom under the title Treefight for Sunlight on 14 February 2011 by Bella Union. Finally, the album made its American debut, under its original title, released on 8 November 2011 by Friendly Fire Recordings.

== Reception ==
Reviews in both Britain and America have been mixed. Indie blog Treble called the album "a powerful and thoughtful first release from a genuinely talented quartet of musicians". Another music blog, Drowned in Sound, went so far as to say "with their debut album being so patchy, they may not be given the chance [to succeed]". Their song "Facing the Sun", and its accompanying music video, had almost universally positive reviews, as the Guardian said "the sense of joy summoned forth by the singing and music [in Facing the Sun] seemed almost preternaturally, lysergically determined".

== Track listing ==
1. "A Dream Before Sleep" - 1:58
2. "You and the New World" - 2:55
3. "The Universe Is a Woman" - 2:58
4. "They Never Did Know" - 3:47
5. "Facing the Sun" - 3:56
6. "Rain Air" - 4:09
7. "Tambourhinoceros Jam" - 1:48
8. "Riddles In Rhymes" - 3:16
9. "What Became of You and I?" - 3:51
10. "Time Stretcher" - 5:28
