= Treefight for Sunlight =

Danish indie pop band

- Origin: North Jutland, Denmark
- Genres: Indie pop Sunshine pop Neo-psychedelia
- Years active: 2007-present
- Labels: Tambourhinoceros (DK); Bella Union (UK); Friendly Fire Recordings (US)
- Members: Mathias Sørensen; Morten Winther Nielsen; Christian Rohde Lindinger pebermink Niels Kirk
- Website: treefightforsunlight.com

Treefight for Sunlight is a four-piece indie pop band from North Jutland, Denmark. The group's current line-up consists of Mathias Sørensen (drums, vocals), Morten Winther Nielsen (guitar, vocals), Christian Rohde Lindinger (bass, vocals), Niels Kirk (piano, vocals). They are produced by Tambourhinoceros in Denmark, Bella Union in the United Kingdom, and Friendly Fire Recordings in the United States. They are known for their unique piano-driven melodies, their combination of folk and psychedelic influences, and their use of upbeat, and sometimes nonsensical lyrics.

== History ==
Their self-titled debut album, Treefight for Sunlight, was released in the United Kingdom in 14 February 2011, and received mixed reviews. Whilst general critical opinion was rarely against the album, concerns were raised that there wasn't enough power in it to ensure a successful career. Music blog DrownedinSound noted that while the album 'suggest[ed] potential' it was not well enough formed to earn a place in the UK music scene. By contrast, Clashmusic said of the group that 'the pace is infectious and small helpings will sweeten your day'.

The single "Facing the Sun" fared better, with The Recommender saying that the band captured the feel they were aiming for 'remarkably well'. The Guardian called it 'one of the most glorious things we've heard all year'.

The group have been compared in style to the Fleet Foxes and MGMT. Music guide Allmusic said that Treefight for Sunlight "could've been plucked from the Elephant 6 Collective".

Their first album was not released until 8 November 2011 in the American market, and was given its original Danish title, A Collection of Vibrations for Your Skull.

In January 2012, their single "Facing the Sun" made an appearance on the programme Revenge, which airs on the American television network ABC.

== Discography ==
=== Studio albums ===
- A Collection of Vibrations for Your Skull (2010)
- Pizza (2014)

=== Singles ===
- "Facing The Sun" (May 2010)
- "What Became of You and I?" (September 2010)
- "Riddles in Rhymes" (February 2011)
- "Come Closer" (February 2014)
- "Somewhere in the Future" (March 2014)
- "Thought Walker" (July 2014)
