= Raphael Sbarge =

American actor (born 1964)

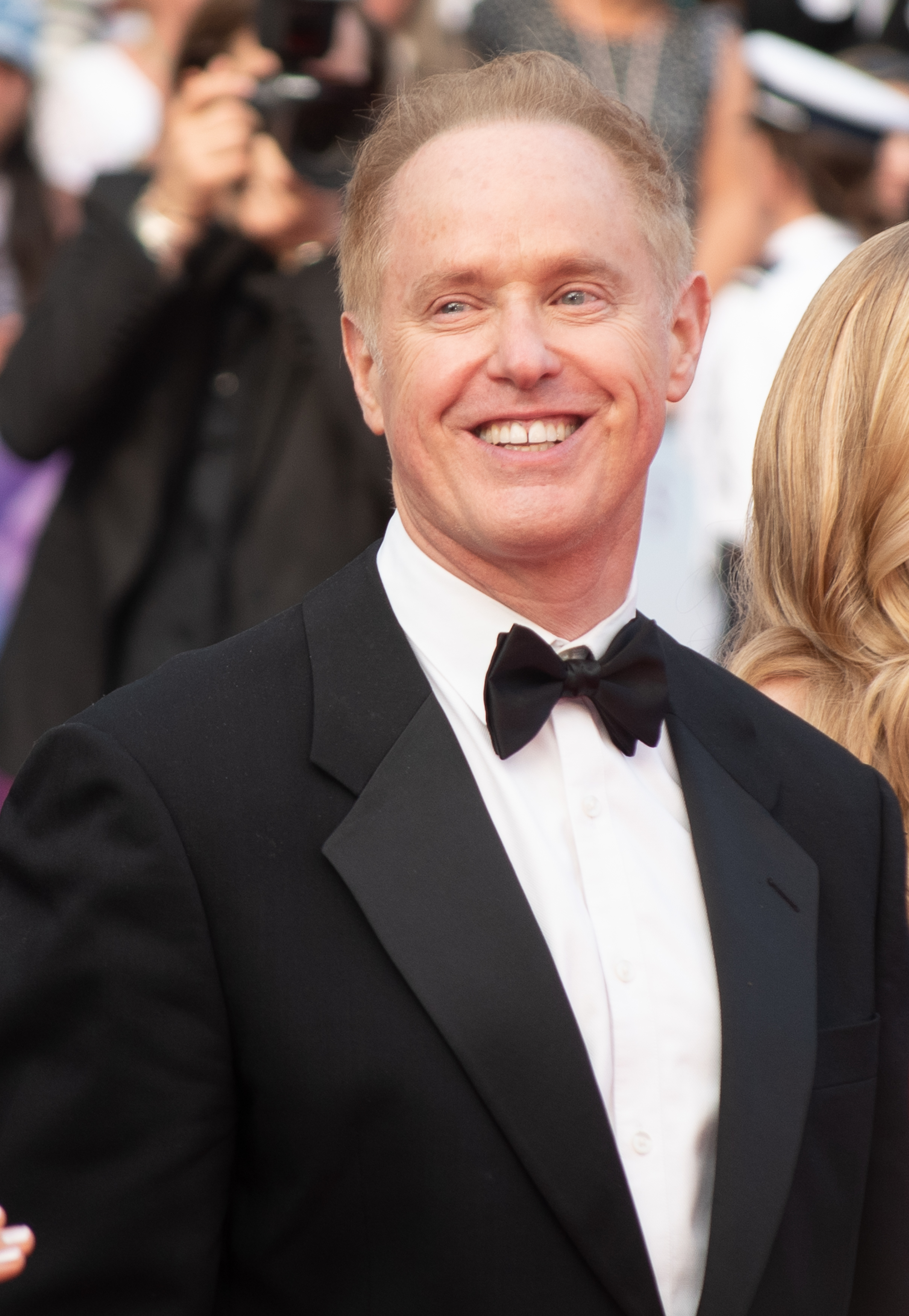
- Sbarge in 2025
- Born: February 12, 1964 (age 62); New York City, U.S.
- Occupations: Actor; filmmaker
- Years active: 1969–present
- Spouses: Lisa Akey (m. 1994; div. 2010) Jenna DeAngeles (m. 2023)
- Children: 2
- Website: www.raphaelsbarge.com

Raphael Sbarge (born February 12, 1964) is an American actor and filmmaker. He is known for his roles as Glenn in Risky Business (1983), Jake Straka in The Guardian (2001–04), Jiminy Cricket / Dr. Archibald Hopper in Once Upon a Time (2011–18) and Inspector David Molk in the TNT series Murder in the First (2014–16). He is also known for voicing Carth Onasi in Star Wars: Knights of the Old Republic (2003), RC-1262 / "Scorch" in Star Wars: Republic Commando (2005) and Kaidan Alenko in the Mass Effect trilogy (2007–12).

== Early life ==
Raphael Sbarge was born into a theater-oriented family in New York City. His mother Jeanne Button was a professional costume designer, and his father, Stephen Sbarge, was an artist, writer and stage director who named his son after the Renaissance artist Raphael. His parents divorced. In 1981, his mother married MacDonald Eaton, a production designer and painter. Sbarge began his career at age five on Sesame Street.

== Career ==
=== Stage ===
Sbarge made his stage debut in 1973 in Edward Bond's stage production Lear. In 1981, he played in Joseph Papp's Shakespeare in the Park production of Henry IV, Part 1. The following year, he made his Broadway debut opposite Faye Dunaway in the short-lived play The Curse of an Aching Heart. Other New York stage credits include Hamlet (1982), Ah, Wilderness! (1988), Ghosts (1988), The Twilight of the Golds (1993), The Shadow Box, and Voices in the Dark (1999).

=== Film ===
Sbarge's film credits include Risky Business (1983), Vision Quest (1985), My Man Adam (1985), My Science Project (1985), Carnosaur (1993), The Hidden II (1993), Babes in Toyland (1997), Independence Day (1996), BASEketball (1998), Message in a Bottle (1999), Pearl Harbor (2001), Home Room (2002) The Duel (2015), and The Exorcist: Believer (2023).

=== Television ===
Sbarge has appeared in numerous television series and television films, including A Streetcar Named Desire with Ann-Margret in 1984; the pilot of the Fox series Werewolf in 1987; Billionaire Boys Club, Back to Hannibal: The Return of Tom Sawyer and Huckleberry Finn in 1990; Murder 101 with Pierce Brosnan and Final Verdict with Treat Williams in 1991; Breast Men with Chris Cooper; Quicksilver Highway with Christopher Lloyd in 1997; and Introducing Dorothy Dandridge with Halle Berry in 1999.

He had recurring roles in five episodes of Star Trek: Voyager in 1996, and in the first four episodes of the sixth season of 24. From 2001 to 2004, Sbarge was a regular cast member of The Guardian, starring Simon Baker. He voiced the character Professor Zei in the second season Avatar: The Last Airbender episode "The Library". He was in an episode of Six Feet Under. In 2007, he appeared in a two-part episode of Journeyman. In 2009, he appeared in an episode of The Mentalist. In 2010, he was in "Practically Perfect", a season five episode of Dexter, as Jim McCourt, an Internal Affairs Agent.

He had a recurring role as Howard Aucker on The Young and the Restless. He played Brian McGuire on Better Days, which lasted for five weeks before being canceled. In 2011, he first appeared in Once Upon a Time, playing the dual roles of Archie Hopper, a therapist, and his fairy tale counterpart, Jiminy Cricket from Pinocchio. In 2013, he played Larry Hermann on Chicago Fire. He played Inspector David Molk, a philosophizing SFPD homicide inspector, on TNT's 2014 series, Murder in the First. In 2016, he made a cameo appearance as Saul Goodman's father on the television series Better Call Saul.

=== Video games ===
He also has voice acted for video games such as Grim Fandango, Star Wars: Knights of the Old Republic, and Star Wars: Knights of the Old Republic II: The Sith Lords as Carth Onasi; as RC-1262 "Scorch" in Star Wars: Republic Commando; as Kaidan Alenko in the Mass Effect series; and as chief scientist Jude Monserrate in The Outer Worlds 2.

=== Directing ===
In 2013, Sbarge began directing web series, serving as executive producer and director of On Begley Street and Jenna's Studio. His 2017 short film The Bird Who Could Fly premiered at the Asians on Film Festival, and won Best Director, Best Ensemble, and Audience Awards at several Asian festivals around the US. He filmed Broadway actor Marty Moran in his Obie Award-winning play called The Tricky Part, which deals with male sexual abuse. It played many festivals around the US, winning Best Director at the Awareness Festival.

Sbarge's 2019 documentary LA Foodways was nominated for an Emmy Award in the Education/Information category. LA Foodways is a one-hour feature documentary and a six-part series that he directed and produced. It debuted on KCET-PBS, which his production company, Wishing Well Entertainment, co-produced with the network. He has directed and produced several other films for KCET that have aired. His current feature, called Only in Theaters, had its theatrical premier at 7 theatres in Los Angeles in Nov. 2022. The film follows a fourth generation family business, a beloved art house cinema chain with ties to the origins of Hollywood called the Laemmle Theaters, and received highly positive reviews. Only in Theaters is opened in New York at the IFC, and New Plaza Cinema's on Jan 18th and 20th. It opened in the San Francisco area on February 24 at the Roxie Theater. After playing in over 70 theaters, Only in Theaters moved to On Demand.

10 Days in Watts earned a Culture/History Emmy at the 76th LA Area Emmys on July 27, 2024.

== Environmentalism ==
Sbarge, actor Ed Begley Jr. and his wife Rachelle Carson Begley, launched Green Wish, an environmentalist non-profit organization aimed at donating to local green organizations through retailers throughout the country. Sbarge was also executive producer of On Begley Street, a web series chronicling the deconstruction of Begley's home and the "building of North America's greenest, most sustainable home."

== Personal life ==
Sbarge is married to Jenna DeAngeles.

== Filmography ==
=== Film ===
Year	Title	Role	Notes
1983	Abuse	Thomas	
1983	Risky Business	Glenn	
1985	Vision Quest	Kenny Schmoozler	
1985	My Science Project	Sherman	
1985	My Man Adam	Adam Swit	
1988	Miracle Mile	Chip (voice)	
1989	Riding the Edge	Matt	
1990	Cold Dog Soup	Guy in Park with Dog	
1993	Carnosaur	Doc Smith	
1994	The Hidden II	MacLachlan	
1996	Independence Day	Commander / Tech	
1997	Babes in Toyland	Tom Piper (voice)	
1998	BASEketball	Minnesota Spokesman	Uncredited
1999	Message in a Bottle	Andy	
1999	Shiloh 2: Shiloh Season	Dr. Collins	Uncredited
2001	Pearl Harbor	Kimmel's Aide	
2002	Home Room	Det. Macready	
2008	Gardens of the Night	Mr. Whitehead	
2016	The Duel	Dr. Morris	
2020	There's No Such Thing as Vampires	Detective Warren	
2023	The Exorcist: Believer	Pastor Don Revans	
2024	Friendship	Garrett	
2025	The History of Sound	Lionel Sr.	

=== Television ===
Year	Title	Role	Notes
1984	A Streetcar Named Desire	The Collector	Television film
1986	Better Days	Brian McGuire	11 episodes
1987	Prison for Children	John Parsons	Television film
1987	Cracked Up	Chris	Television film
1987	Werewolf	Theodore "Ted" Nichols	Episode: "Werewolf"
1987	Billionaire Boys Club	Eric Fairmont	Television film
1988	The Cosby Show	Mr. Jenkins	Episode: "Move It"
1990	Quantum Leap	Will	Episode: "Animal Frat"
1990	Monsters	Alex	Episode: "Perchance to Dream"
1990	Back to Hannibal: The Return of Tom Sawyer and Huckleberry Finn	Tom Sawyer	Television film
1990–95	Murder, She Wrote	Stephen Thurlow, Peter Franklin	3 episodes
1991	Murder 101	Robert Miner	Television film
1991	Final Verdict	Al Boyd	Television film
1992	Sisters	Jim Atwater	Episode: "Good Help Is Hard to Find"
1992	Civil Wars	Anthony Jecker	Episode: "Das Boat House"
1993	L.A. Law	Anthony Marciante	Episode: "Parent Trap"
1993	Sirens	Jeremy Beecher	Episode: "Everybody Lies"
1995	SeaQuest DSV	Avatar	Episode: "Alone"
1995	Nowhere Man	Dr. Moen	Episode: "Something About Her"
1996	Star Trek: Voyager	Michael Jonas	5 episodes
1996	7th Heaven	Steve	Episode: "No Funerals and a Wedding"
1996	The Pretender	Jeffrey Baytos	Episode: "A Virus Among Us"
1996	NYPD Blue	Fred	Episode: "Ted and Carey's Bogus Adventure"
1996	Dark Skies	Mark Simonson	Episode: "We Shall Overcome"
1997	Quicksilver Highway	Kerry Parker / Bill Hogan	Television film
1997	Party of Five	Paul Archer	Episode: "I Declare"
1997	Viper	Timothy Ramsay	Episode: "Whistle Blower"
1997	The Parent 'Hood	Douglas	Episode: "Don't Go There"
1997	Dharma & Greg	Agent Gerson	Episode: "He Ain't Heavy, He's My Father"
1997	Breast Men	Larson's Lawyer	Television film
1999	Will & Grace	Alex	Episode: "My Fair Maid-y"
1999	Vengeance Unlimited	Steve Bazini	Episode: "Legalese"
1999	Nash Bridges	Jim Edwards	Episode: "Hide and Seek"
1999	Rescue 77	Man	Episode: "Remember Me: Part 1"
1999	Charmed	Brent Miller	Episode: "Out of Sight"
1999	Introducing Dorothy Dandridge	Vegas Hotel Manager	Television film
1999	A.T.F.	Director Hale's Assistant	Television film
1999	Roughnecks: Starship Troopers Chronicles	Lieutenant Bernstein	Episode: "Swarm"
1999	All My Children	Father Tony	1 episode
1999–2000	Profiler	Danny Burke	4 episodes
2000	Ally McBeal	Attorney	Episode: "In Search of Pygmies"
2000	Judging Amy	Paul Brody	Episode: "Human Touch"
2000	Diagnosis Murder	Dr. Walter Hart	Episode: "The Patient Detective"
2001	Six Feet Under	Father Clark	Episode: "Brotherhood"
2001–04	The Guardian	Jake Straka	67 episodes
2004	Crossing Jordan	Phil	Episode: "After Dark"
2004	Without a Trace	Leo Cota	Episode: "Light Years"
2004, 2010	CSI: Crime Scene Investigation	Aaron Laner, Donald Fiore	2 episodes
2005	ER	Mr. Kirkendall	2 episodes
2005	CSI: NY	District Attorney Latham	2 episodes
2005	Inconceivable	Bob Brewer	Episode: "From Here to Motility"
2005	Just Legal	Father Ross	2 episodes
2005	Threshold	Richard Tate	Episode: "The Burning"
2005	Numb3rs	Malcolm Galway	Episode: "Calculated Risk"
2005	Nip/Tuck	Silas Prine	Episode: "Frankenlaura"
2006	Justice League Unlimited	Deadman (voice)	Episode: "Dead Reckoning"
2006	Avatar: The Last Airbender	Professor Zei (voice)	Episode: "The Library"
2006	The Closer	Derek Draper	Episode: "The Other Woman"
2006	Standoff	Donald Leeson	Episode: "One Shot Stop"
2006	CSI: Miami	Larry Fremont	Episode: "Backstabbers"
2007	24	Ray Wallace	4 episodes
2007	Eyes	Sam Solomon	Episode: "Poison"
2007	Grey's Anatomy	Paul	2 episodes
2007	Cold Case	Henry Raymes	Episode: "Thrill Kill"
2007	Bones	Doug Doyley	Episode: "The Widow's Son in the Windshield"
2007	Journeyman	Aeden Bennett	2 episodes
2007	Random! Cartoons	Willy (voice)	Episode: "Bradwurst"
2008	Shark	Christopher Hoffs	Episode: "Wayne's World 3: Killer Shark"
2008	Ghost Whisperer	Larry Jones	Episode: "Ghost in the Machine"
2008–09	Prison Break	Ralph Becker	6 episodes
2009	Big Love	Rob O'Hare	Episode: "Block Party"
2009	Eleventh Hour	Dr. Matthew Kaplan	Episode: "Miracle"
2009	The Young and the Restless	Agent Aucker	6 episodes
2009	Dollhouse	Richard	Episode: "Echo"
2009	Hawthorne	Doug Gache	Episode: "No Guts, No Glory"
2009	The Mentalist	Hollis Dunninger	Episode: "Redemption"
2009	Heroes	Sheriff Werner	Episode: "Strange Attractors"
2010	Medium	Josh Berryman	Episode: "Sal"
2010	Lie to Me	Richard Prosser	Episode: "Sweet Sixteen"
2010	Rizzoli & Isles	Mr. Davis	Episode: "She Works Hard for the Money"
2010	The Defenders	Walter	Episode: "Las Vegas v. Reid"
2010	Dexter	Jim McCourt	3 episodes
2010	NCIS	Rupert Kritzer	Episode: "Cracked"
2010	Burn Notice	Pete Jackman	Episode: "Dead or Alive"
2010, 2017	Law & Order: Special Victims Unit	Wayne Hankett, Atty. Harold Timmons	2 episodes
2010–11	The Secret Life of the American Teenager	Dave	2 episodes
2011	Detroit 1-8-7	Marcus Wiler	Episode: "Legacy / Drag City"
2011	Criminal Minds: Suspect Behavior	Davis Scofield	Episode: "Two of a Kind"
2011	No Ordinary Family	Detective O'Bannon	Episode: "No Ordinary Future"
2011	Law & Order: LA	Dennis Ackroyd	Episode: "Plummer Park"
2011	Drop Dead Diva	Donny Gibson	Episode: "Toxic"
2011–18	Once Upon a Time	Jiminy Cricket / Dr. Archibald Hopper	46 episodes
2012	Criminal Minds	Carl Finster	Episode: "Magnificent Light"
2013	The Good Wife	Mr. Jaffer	Episode: "Red Team, Blue Team"
2013	Monday Mornings	Mr. Cooper	Episode: "Who's Sorry Now?"
2013	Chicago Fire	Larry Herrmann	Episode: "A Coffin That Small"
2013	Castle	Dr. Darrell Meeks	Episode: "The Fast and the Furriest"
2013	Perception	Jerry Brockner	Episode: "Alienation"
2013	Necessary Roughness	Carl Weber	2 episodes
2014	Scorpion	Curator Paulson	Episode: "True Colors"
2014–16	Murder in the First	David Molk	32 episodes
2015	Stalker	Drew Summers	Episode: "Secrets and Lies"
2015	Hawaii Five-0	Sam Alexander	Episode: "Pono Kaulike"
2015	iZombie	Richard Di Palma	Episode: "Even Cowgirls Get the Black and Blues"
2016	NCIS: Los Angeles	Leo Chadmont	Episode: "Core Values"
2016	Elementary	Richard Davenport	Episode: "Miss Taken"
2016	Better Call Saul	Charles McGill Sr.	Episode: "Inflatable"
2017	Bates Motel	George Lowery	Episode: "Dreams Die First"
2017	The Night Shift	VA Doctor	Episode: "Recoil"
2017	Law & Order True Crime	Jon Conte	2 episodes
2017	Longmire	Agent Decker	3 episodes
2017	Wisdom of the Crowd	Isaac Wallace	Episode: "Denial of Service"
2018	Blue Bloods	Mickey Rodansky	Episode: "School of Hard Knocks"
2018	MacGyver	Ralph Jericho	Episode: "Skyscraper + Power"
2018	The Good Doctor	Edward Austin Thomas	Episode: "Hello"
2019	NCIS: New Orleans	Jeff Grassley	Episode: "X"
2019	The Blacklist	Ned	Episode: "Lady Luck"
2020	Hunters	Dieter Zweigelt	Episode: "At Night, All Birds Are Black"
2020	Fear the Walking Dead	Ed	Episode: "Damage from the Inside"
2021	New Amsterdam	Dane	Episode: "The New Normal"
2022	The Resident	Lieutenant Governor Beaumont	2 episodes
2022	1883	Major Hemphill	Episode: "This Is Not Your Heaven"
2022	The Rookie	Jonah Russell	Episode: "Coding"
2022	Gaslit	Charles Shaffer	2 episodes
2024–26	Law & Order	Defense Attorney Brian Lee	2 episodes
2025	Task	Chief Dorsey	3 episodes
2025	The Diplomat	Senator Matt Pikorski	Episode: "The Riderless Horse"

=== Video games ===
Year	Title	Role
1998	Grim Fandango	Terry Malloy, Ensign Arnold, Mayan Mechanic
1998	Star Wars: Rogue Squadron	Dak Ralter, Rogue Members
2000	Star Wars: Force Commander	Dellis Tantor
2003	Star Wars: Knights of the Old Republic	Carth Onasi
2004	EverQuest II	Various voices
2004	Star Wars Knights of the Old Republic II: The Sith Lords	Carth Onasi
2005	Star Wars: Republic Commando	RC-1262 / "Scorch"
2007	Medal of Honor: Vanguard	Pvt. Mike Slauson, Allied Soldiers
2007	Avatar: The Last Airbender – The Burning Earth	Professor Zei
2007	Mass Effect	Kaidan Alenko
2010	Mass Effect 2	Kaidan Alenko
2012	Mass Effect 3	Kaidan Alenko

== Theatre ==
Year	Play	Role	Venue	Ref.
1973	Lear	A Boy	Yale Repertory Theatre	
1974	Shlemiel the First	Feivish	Yale Repertory Theatre	
1981	Henry IV, Part 1	Lord John of Lancaster	Delacorte Theater	
1982	The Curse of an Aching Heart	Martin Thomas Walsh	Hayes Theater	
1982	Hamlet	Reynaldo / Player Queen / Apprentice Gravedigger	The Public Theater	
1985	Short Change	Benjamin	Samuel Beckett Theatre	
1986	Sorrow and Sons		Vineyard Theatre	
1988	The Iceman Cometh		Falcon Theatre	
1988	Ah, Wilderness!	Richard Miller	Neil Simon Theatre	
1988	Ghosts	Oswald Alving	100 East 17th Street	
1989	Dutch Landscape	Danny	Mark Taper Forum	
1991	Picnic	Alan Seymour	Williamstown Theatre Festival	
1991	Booth Is Back	Edwin Booth	Williamstown Theatre Festival; Long Wharf Theatre	
1993	The Twilight of the Golds	David Gold	Booth Theatre	
1994	The Wood Demon	Leonid Stepanovich Zheltoukhin	Mark Taper Forum	
1994–95	The Shadow Box	Mark	Circle in the Square Theatre	
1995	Time of My Life	Adam	Williamstown Theatre Festival Main Stage	
1995	Are You Now or Have You Ever Been?	Larry Parks	Odyssey Theatre	
1996	Mad Forest	Radu Antonescu	Matrix Theatre	
1997	Dangerous Corner	Gordon Whitehouse	Matrix Theatre	
1998	Death of a Salesman	Biff	Falcon Theatre	
1999	Voices in the Dark	Owen	Longacre Theatre	
2000	The Glass Menagerie	Tom Wingfield	Pasadena Playhouse	
2001	The Birthday Party	Stanley	Matrix Theatre	
2002	Incident at Vichy	Leduc	Skirball Cultural Center	
2006	The Cherry Orchard	Semyon Panteleyevich Yepikhodov	Mark Taper Forum	
2006	The Doctors Chekhov	Anton Chekhov	Deaf West Theatre	
2006	Work Song: Three Views of Frank Lloyd Wright	George Brodelle / Grant	Skirball Cultural Center	
2008	American Tales	Burley / Bartleby	Deaf West Theatre	
2008	The Voysey Inheritance	Edward Voysey	Deaf West Theatre	
2009	The Happy Ones	Walter Wells	South Coast Repertory	
2010	Awake and Sing!	Sam Feinschreiber	Skirball Cultural Center	
