= Feel.Love.Thinking.Of =

Feel.Love.Thinking.Of.

Studio album by Faunts
- Released: February 17, 2009
- Genre: Electronic rock, dream pop, new wave, space rock
- Length: 44:37
- Label: Friendly Fire

Faunts chronology
M4 (2006)	Feel.Love.Thinking.Of. (2009)	Left Here Alone (2012)

Professional ratings
Review scores
Source	Rating
Allmusic	3.5/5 stars
The A.V. Club	C
Pitchfork Media	(7.2/10)
PopMatters	6/10
Tiny Mix Tapes	2.5/5 stars

Feel.Love.Thinking.Of. is the second studio album by the rock band Faunts. It was released in 2009.

== Track listing ==
1. "Feel.Love.Thinking.Of." – 3:09 (featured on the soundtrack of NHL 2K10)
2. "Input" – 2:41
3. "It Hurts Me All the Time" – 3:12
4. "Out On a Limb" – 4:11
5. "Lights Are Always On" – 5:46
6. "Das Malefitz" – 4:05 (featured on the soundtrack of Mass Effect 3)
7. "I Think I'll Start a Fire" – 4:30
8. "Alarmed/Lights" – 7:40
9. "So Far Away" – 3:11
10. "Explain" – 6:12
