= The Old Soul =

Canadian rock music group

- Origin: Toronto, Ontario, Canada
- Genres: Indie rock
- Years active: 2003–2008
- Labels: Hand of God; Grifter; Universal; Friendly Fire
- Past members: Luca Maoloni; Nick Taylor; Matt McLaren; Jay Anderson; Andrew Innanen; Jo-Ann Goldsmith; Paul Aucoin; Andrew Scott

The Old Soul was a Canadian indie rock band formed in 2003 in Toronto. The ensemble was founded and led by Luca Maoloni, initially as a solo project. They performed with variety of instruments and styles, with critics drawing comparisons to Broken Social Scene and The Polyphonic Spree. They are known for live lyrical and musical variations on album standards.

== History ==
Maoloni studied piano at The Royal Conservatory of Music in Toronto, and went on to complete a degree in Music Theory and Composition at the University of Western Ontario. In 1988, he completed a Music Industry Arts collegiate degree in recording. Prior to The Old Soul, he was a member of Hollowphonic and White Star Line.

The Old Soul's self-titled debut album was released in 2004 (and reissued two years later by Universal), and followed in 2006 with She's Got Party Davis Eyes. The third album Gold was released in 2007.

== Discography ==
- The Old Soul (2004), Hand of God
- She's Got Party Davis Eyes (2006), Hand of God
- Gold (2007), Grifter
