= Tambourhinoceros =

Danish independent record label

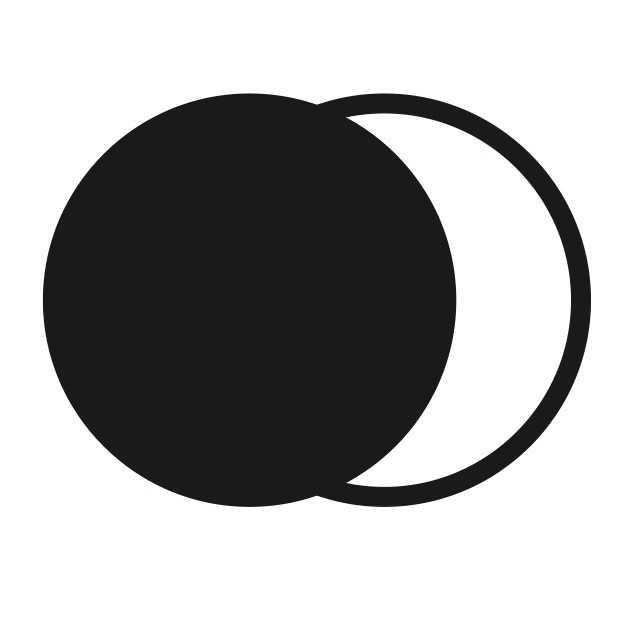
- Founded: 2010
- Founder: Kristoffer Rom, Aske Zidore
- Distributor(s): Australia: Rocket Austria: Rough Trade Distribution Belgium: V2 Records Canada: MVD Czech Republic: Mystic Denmark: Playground Music Scandinavia Estonia: Playground Music Scandinavia Finland: Playground Music Scandinavia France: Bigwax Germany: Rough Trade Distribution Greece: Rockerolla Italy: Audioglobe Japan: Disk Union, P-Vine Records Latvia: Playground Music Scandinavia Lithuania: Playground Music Scandinavia Netherlands: V2 Records New Zealand: Southbound Norway: Playground Music Scandinavia Poland: Mystic Portugal: Music as Usual Slovenia: Matrix Music Spain: Music as Usual Sweden: Playground Music Scandinavia United Kingdom and Republic of Ireland: Republic of Music United States: MVD Digital distribution (Worldwide): Ingrooves
- Genre: alternative, experimental music, Indie rock, indie pop
- Country of origin: Denmark
- Location: Copenhagen
- Official website: www.tambourhinoceros.net

Tambourhinoceros is a Danish independent record label and Music publisher.

== Background ==
The label was created by two members of the band Oh No Ono in 2009 as a way for the founders to show the "burning love we have for music (our releases as well as art and music)". Its first release was Kristen and Marie's debut EP in May 2010.

Tambourhinoceros became internationally known for its production of Danish indie pop band Treefight for Sunlight, which received positive ratings in both the US and the UK. On that band's debut album, A Collection of Vibrations for Your Skull, a song entitled "Tambourhinoceros Jam" was included, which is assumed to be a tribute to the record label. Since then the label has released internationally successful artists like Iceage, Palace Winter and Efterklang among others.

In 2011, Tambourhinoceros was awarded with a Gaffa Award for its contribution to the Danish music scene.

Whilst it is primarily a record label, Tambourhinoceros is also doing publishing, management, graphic design and web design for their artists.

Aske Zidore left the label in 2012, and since early 2013 Tue Kjerstein & Kristoffer Rom have been the managing directors.

In 2016 Tambourhinoceros was recognised as one of Europe's most inspiring young label and was selected by IMPALA and The Independent Echo for the FIVEUNDERFIFTEEN campaign.

== Artists ==
- 4 Guys from the Future
- Andrea Welz
- Annsofie Salomon
- August Rosenbaum
- Birthgiving Toad
- Blondage
- Brimheim
- Cancer
- Communions
- Chorus Grant
- Crush
- CTM (Cæcilie Trier)
- Efterklang
- FCAN
- Grønflammeskoven
- Hooray for Earth
- Iceage
- Inner Garden vs Celeste
- Intet Altid
- IRAH
- Kala-OK
- Kirsten & Marie
- Kleo
- Lucky Lo
- Molina
- Oh No Ono
- Palace Winter
- Pardans
- PRE-Be-UN
- Rangleklods
- Shout Wellington Air Force
- School of X
- Skammens vogn
- The Entrepreneurs
- The League of Extraordinary Gentlemen
- The New Spring
- Thulebasen
- Treefight for Sunlight
