= Ashley Williams (Mass Effect) =

Fictional character in the Mass Effect series

- Mass Effect character
- Ashley's design in Mass Effect 3, as presented in The Art of the Mass Effect Universe
- First appearance: Mass Effect (2007)
- Voiced by: Kimberly Brooks

In-universe information
- Class: Soldier
- Skill: Combat

Ashley Madeline Williams is a character in BioWare's Mass Effect franchise, who acts as a party member (or "squadmate") in the first and third games in the series. Within the series, she is a human Systems Alliance Marine, who is a potential romance option for a male Commander Shepard throughout the first three Mass Effect games. Ashley becomes part of Shepard's squad during the first observed Reaper attack in the first Mass Effect. In a late-game choice on the planet Virmire, the player must choose whether to save Ashley or Kaidan Alenko in order to advance the narrative; this choice leads to the latter character's death. If Ashley is saved, she will make a cameo appearance in Mass Effect 2, followed by a more substantive appearance in Mass Effect 3 as a potential member of Shepard's squad. Ashley is voiced by American voice actress Kimberly Brooks.

While Ashley has been consistently featured in the original trilogy's marketing and is considered one of the franchise's most prominent characters, her characterization has received a largely negative reception; much of the criticism focused on the character's abrasive personality, intolerant views towards other alien species, and presentation as being strongly religious, while some defended the character and expressed a view that the character is misunderstood.

== Development ==
Ashley was one of the companion characters to be featured in the earliest demo footage for the first Mass Effect game; in a 2006 video, director Casey Hudson drew attention to her fully voiced interactions with Shepard and another squad member, Garrus Vakarian, where she expressed cynicism and exasperation at his alleged ethnic loyalties. This is meant to evoke a seamless cinematic experience as opposed to the player reading an extensive amount of dialogue text. She ties her hair into a bun, and wears a bubblegum pink and marshmallow white battle armor as her default appearance in the first two Mass Effect games.

For her appearance in Mass Effect 3, Ashley is intentionally redesigned to showcase her sex appeal and lets her hair down instead of tying it up. She wears a stylish officer's uniform which showcases the new Alliance colors of blue and white when not on the field. An unused idea from the third game's early development process involved Ashley confronting a corrupted Shepard, who had been forced to turn to Reaper technology to accomplish his goals, which echoed Saren's character arc from the first game. Another scene cut during development involved Ashley asking whether Shepard has any recollections of experiencing the afterlife following their demise during the destruction of The Normandy and prior to their revival by Cerberus in Mass Effect 2.

Ashley was originally voiced by E. G. Daily, but she was recast when the developers did not feel the romantic chemistry they were aiming for between the character and Shepard. Her replacement, Kimberly Brooks, recalled that there were well over ten recording sessions and would generally last about four hours, where she often recorded by herself. She said working on a BioWare video game is intense as there is a lot of depth to the story and its characters, and that it is vocally stressful and more labor-intensive than other media due to the size of the project and its numerous possibilities. Brooks credited voice director Ginny McSwain, whom she had worked with prior to Mass Effect, for helping her "tap into the character" as a woman soldier who is deeply religious and whose family has a strong military service tradition. Brooks herself does not play video games, citing a lack of free time, though she enjoyed playing Ashley. Her positive experience as Ashley's voice actor got her interested in doing further voice over work for video games. Brooks released a fully voiced recording of Ashley's email to Shepard prior to the release of Mass Effect 3, and attributed the positive reception she received to fans wanting a more substantial appearance by Ashley for the second game.

== Appearances ==
=== In video games ===
==== Mass Effect ====
Ashley is the sole survivor of her squad following a surprise attack by the geth on the human colony world Eden Prime, and joins Shepard's squad during the Normandy's first mission, replacing Corporal Richard L. Jenkins who was killed in action earlier. Later in the game, on the planet Virmire, Ashley along with Kaidan will opt to assist a salarian commando unit in their assault on Saren's laboratory complex to destroy data for the genophage cure. Prior to the assault, Ashley may intervene and fatally shoot krogan squadmate Urdnot Wrex from behind after he draws a gun at Shepard in a confrontation about the genophage cure, if he is not convinced to stand down. This may occur with a direct order, or after Wrex refuses to continue the discussion. During the assault, the player is confronted with a choice that may result in Ashley being killed when a nuclear warhead is detonated. If she is sacrificed, later dialogue indicates that the salarian and turian governments have awarded her their most highest medals, honoring her sacrifice for soldiers not even of her own species.

==== Mass Effect 2 ====
Ashley appears in Mass Effect 2, provided she lived through the first game. Now an Operations Chief, Ashley is sent to Horizon officially on a mission to provide anti-orbital weapons to the colonists. She is first seen defending the colony against a swarm of Collector insect-like "seekers," but ultimately is overwhelmed and paralyzed. Upon being rescued, she voices disapproval towards Shepard's alliance with the anthropocentric paramilitary group Cerberus. If a romantic relationship between her and Shepard is carried into the game, she will later send him an apologetic email, expressing her desire to be with him once more.

==== Mass Effect 3 ====
Ashley returns in Mass Effect 3, provided she survives the events of the original game. By the events of Mass Effect 3, she has attained the rank of Lieutenant Commander. She is seriously injured during a mission to recover plans for the Crucible on Mars, but makes a full recovery and is chosen as the second human Spectre after Shepard. Shepard eventually learns from the salarian councilor that humanity's councilor, Donnel Udina, may pose a security risk. The Normandy travels to the Citadel, where Shepard confirms with the salarian councilor that Udina has partnered with Cerberus and leads a coup to overthrow his fellow councilors, who are being protected by Ashley. Udina is killed and Cerberus forces led by the Illusive Man's trusted assassin Kai Leng retreat in response, though the salarian councilor as well as Ashley may perish by the conclusion of the event; the outcome is based on the sum total of the player's prior decisions. If Ashley survives the coup attempt, she may be allowed to join Shepard's team on board the Normandy SR-2, and either start or resume a romantic relationship with Shepard. In the alternative, Ashley is listed on the Normandy SR-2's memorial wall on the Crew Deck.

If Ashley accompanies Shepard on the final mission to the Conduit in London and the player has not accrued enough war asset points, she will die. If Ashley survives and is in a relationship with Shepard, she will place a plaque on the memorial wall on the Normandy. If enough war points are accrued, Shepard will survive and Ashley will not place the plaque, but instead will smile in reminiscence.

=== In other media ===
Ashley appears in the third issue of the comic series Mass Effect: Foundation. Ashley was also featured prominently in marketing material such as commercials and trailers, as well as cover art for the first game. She is seen accompanying both gendered versions of Commander Shepard to battle in the cinematic trailers which promoted the March 2012 launch for Mass Effect 3. An action figure for the character was released by Play Arts Kai in 2012.

== Critical reception ==
Ashley has received a generally negative reception from fans and video game journalists. PC Gamer described her as one of the most annoying characters, and ridiculed her pink and white armor, though her default cobalt blue armor in Mass Effect 3 is considered to be an improvement. GamesRadar+ criticized her abrasive personality and said she has similar traits as Ana Lucia Cortez from the ABC television series Lost. Daniel Horowitz from VentureBeat consider Ashley to be "harsh and brash", and that her attitude is "out of line" compared to the mild mannered Kaidan. Alex Knapp, a staff writer at Forbes, criticized Ashley's revamped design in Mass Effect 3, claiming that she looks like a stripper.

While Ashley is statistically more likely to be chosen compared to Kaidan for the decision at Virmire, some sources opined that this is because Kaidan is perceived to be the less palatable option; she is considered one of the least popular characters in the entire trilogy. Both Destin Legarie from IGN and Andy Kelly from PC Gamer expressed a personal preference for Kaidan over Ashley when choosing the Virmire Survivor in the first game. Horowitz argued that logically Kaidan should be prioritized over Ashley as the Virmire Survivor since she is "merely a straggler picked up on Eden Prime" while Shepard's history with him "extends far beyond the opening events of the story".

The character has been criticized for being racist. Evan Narcisse, writing for The Atlantic, said her racist attitude "floated around as an annoying buzz in the background" until the scene where she unexpectedly shot and killed Wrex in Virmire, and noted that he did not hesitate to leave Ashley to her fate later on. Yussef Cole found her views about working with other alien races "troubling" and compared her shooting of Wrex to "faux self-defensive violence that is uncomfortably reminiscent of the way police in America react to black men and women". Knapp argued that her characterization in Mass Effect 3 was awful, alleging that she is "more racist and more of a jerk" and that "everything that had the potential to redeem her character was stripped away". Kenneth Shepard at Fanbyte analyzed Ashley's arc across the Mass Effect series, saying that her views on aliens in the first game set a strong foundation for the character to see a redemption arc throughout the trilogy, but pointed out that by Mass Effect 3 she never actually disavowed her prejudice against aliens, making her character ring hollow compared to others who saw more introspection throughout the series. Stephen Bush from the New Statesman remarked that Ashley is "one of the most disliked characters in videogame history", and commented that her character is consistently "prickly and anti-alien" throughout the series. Brooks is aware of her character being called a "space racist" by players, and remarked that "everyone either loved or hated Ash". Tyree Brown from The Nerdist noted Brooks as a black actress who voiced a white character in a critical examination of the relationship between the video game industry and the Black Lives Matter movement.

The character's emphasis on her faith has not been well received. Joshua and Ita Irizarry noted the "broad negativity" many players have shown towards Ashley's expressions of her faith in the original Mass Effect during the course of their research, with only a minority of players indicating that Ashley's flawed personality made their gameplay experience more interesting. They surmised that based on Ashley's assertion that her faith plays a major role in who she is, her "religiosity may have been seen as a reflection of the player, individually, and humanity as a whole". Matt Cronn from Geeks Under Grace, a website which covers popular culture topics from a Christian perspective, felt that the original Mass Effect fumbled on the subject of God and religion. He opined that Ashley "did not go on to represent God in the best fashion", and called her a "hot-headed, judgmental" character who is xenophobic.

A few PC Gamer staff members, most notably Chris Thursten who emphasized her staunch opposition to pro-human groups like Cerberus and Terra Firma as well as her willingness to question the infallibility of Shepard's decisions, defended and praised the character. He argued that Ashley is "one of the most substantially well-rounded characters in the series" as well as "one of the few that doesn't need Shepard to step in and fix her life". In an article published by GamesRadar which focused specifically on Ashley, Thursten acknowledged that while she is probably the most contentious among the original trilogy's cast of characters, he maintained that "her value to the series comes specifically from the fact that she's willing to voice challenging views", and that "companion characters are at their best when they're written like real people." Luca Sarpori from The Games Machine called Ashley a strong female character, and suggested that she is despised by some players because of her potential role in the killing of Wrex in the first game.

In his article which was published by Gamasutra, Brandon Perdue noted that since players interact with the game through gameplay, the significance of choosing which character to save feels non-trivial and arises from its very real gameplay consequences. However, Perdue questioned the emotional weight behind what was "popularly discussed as one of the most momentous decisions a player can make in a game" as he found neither character to be particularly sympathetic.
