= Kaidan Alenko =

Fictional character

- Mass Effect character
- Kaidan from Mass Effect 3 (2012)
- First appearance: Mass Effect (2007)
- Voiced by: Raphael Sbarge

In-universe information
- Home: Vancouver, Earth
- Class: Sentinel
- Skill: Biotics; Technology

Kaidan Alenko is a fictional character in BioWare's Mass Effect franchise, who acts as a party member (or "squadmate") in the first and third games in the series. The character is initially introduced in the original Mass Effect as a human Systems Alliance Officer and primary squad member in Commander Shepard's team. Kaidan's fate on the planet Virmire is part of a pivotal decision which the player has to make in order to advance the narrative.

If Kaidan survives the events of Mass Effect, by the events of Mass Effect 2 he is encountered on the human colony of Horizon after Shepard receives a tip that Horizon will be the next human colony to be abducted by the enigmatic race known as the Collectors. In Mass Effect 3, Kaidan initially appears at the Alliance base in Vancouver before taking off on a mission to Mars with Shepard and the crew of the Normandy SR-2. Kaidan is voiced by Raphael Sbarge.

Initially presented as a heterosexual love interest for a female Shepard in the first game, the character is reintroduced in Mass Effect 3 as a bisexual love interest, a decision by BioWare which attracted praise from most critics. Kaidan has received an overall mixed to positive reception throughout his appearances in the Mass Effect trilogy.

== Character overview ==
Raised in Canada, Kaidan is a Systems Alliance officer born with the ability to manipulate dark energy, employ telekinesis and create mass effect fields called biotics, after his mother is affected by "Element Zero" during an incident in Singapore while he was in utero. In gameplay terms, Kaidan is a "Sentinel", who combines biotic and technological abilities to manipulate the environment, enhance defensive capabilities, disable and track enemies. Kaidan suffers from infrequent, but debilitating, migraines as a side effect of the controversial L2 implants he was fitted with during his time at Biotic Acclimatization and Temperance Training ("BAaT"), nicknamed "brain camp" by Kaidan.

Kaidan is cited as an example of the consequences that come with branching narratives in video games. In the first game the player has to decide whether Kaidan or Ashley Williams would survive during a late-game mission on the planet Virmire. The squad member who survives will afterwards serve as a constant reminder of the player's choices throughout the Mass Effect trilogy. Kaidan shares the same overall story arc as Ashley in the sequels and while both characters effectively function as opposite-gender placeholders for one another throughout the trilogy, they start off differently in the first game and have distinct personalities and skills.

Kaidan is a romance option for a female Shepard in the first game, and their relationship could persist over the entire trilogy depending on the player's choices. He can also be romanced by a male Shepard in Mass Effect 3, where he would reveal his unrequited feelings for the Commander.

== Creation and development ==
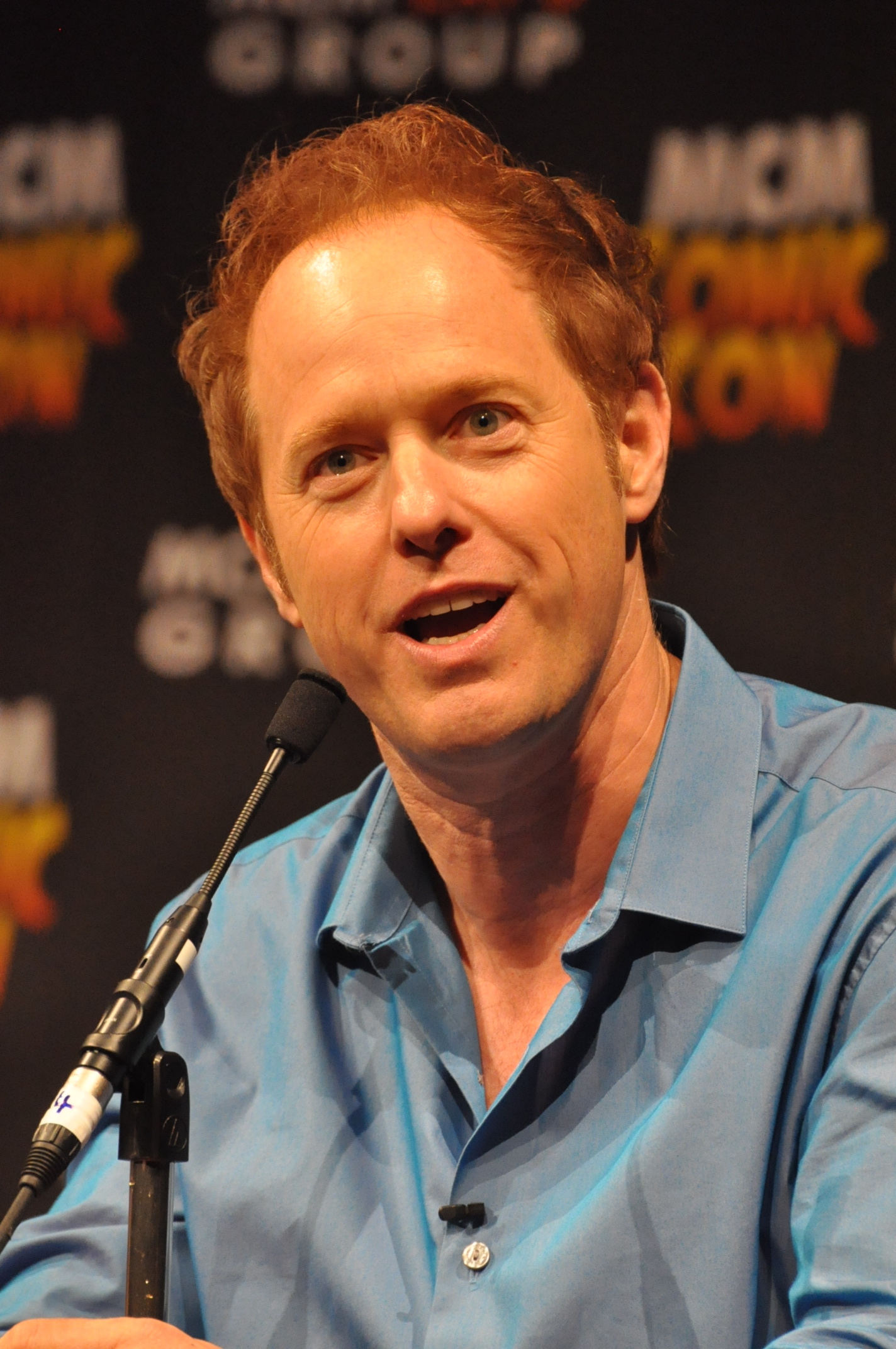
Raphael Sbarge in May 2013. He voiced Kaidan for all media.

Kaidan Alenko's face is modeled after Luciano Costa. BioWare opted to reuse Kaidan's visage from the first game and updated his face model for Mass Effect 3. BioWare decided to overhaul Kaidan's look to make him more memorable: in contrast to his generic outfit in previous games, Kaidan's default armor for 3 has a blue-and-white theme. The armor design went through multiple iterations as the team was figuring out the Systems Alliance colors for human male characters before settling on the final color scheme. The character is given a more muscular redesign in order to "show that he's seen a lot of action and is ready to fight in the biggest war the galaxy has ever seen".

In a 2013 interview, Kaidan's voice actor Raphael Sbarge claimed that Kaidan was originally planned to be a romance option for both genders in the original Mass Effect, and that he did work on the extra content that never made it to the final version of the game. He was personally enthusiastic about BioWare's decision to make Kaidan available as a same-sex romance option in Mass Effect 3. In March 2017, Jessica Lachenal from The Mary Sue reported that fans have uncovered cut content from the game files of the original trilogy, which reveal entirely voice-acted lines from both Ashley and Kaidan for a same-sex romances relationship with Shepard which never made the final cut of the first game, as well as coded lines where Kaidan would address a male Shepard as if he was female. In 2021, project director Mac Walters clarified in an interview about Mass Effect Legendary Edition that Kaidan was never intended to be a same-sex romance option in the first Mass Effect, and that the presence of the aforementioned coded lines in the first game's files are a combination of technical oversight and human error. Walters further confirmed that the developers had no intention to develop Kaidan as a same sex romance option for the remastered version of the first game, as the Legendary Edition compilation is only intended to introduce generalized improvements and otherwise stays as close to the source material as possible.

Sbarge used his natural speaking voice for the character, albeit with a slightly formal manner. Sbarge credited Ginny McSwain, a voice director on the first two games, for helping him find the right tone for Kaidan to balance his military background along with a solid and straightforward personality, which according to Sbarge has become the character's hallmark. Sbarge said he could relate to Kaidan in that the character is guided by his conscience and tries to do the right thing.

== Appearances ==
=== In video games ===
==== Mass Effect ====
Alenko first appears on the SSV Normandy as a Staff Lieutenant and head of the starship's marine detail. He accompanies Shepard on his first mission to Eden Prime where they learn that Saren is leading the attack with the geth. Upon encountering Gunnery Chief Ashley Williams, she joins the mission and following the mission on Eden Prime, he gives his recommendation to Captain Anderson that she should be assigned to the Normandy.

After several missions, the squad is ordered to the planet Virmire, where Shepard can assign Kaidan or Ashley to work with the salarians or assemble the bomb that will be used to destroy Saren's facility. Shepard will later be given a choice between saving either Ashley or Kaidan, as Shepard's forces have only adequate resources to save one of them during the evacuation. If Kaidan is chosen, he will express survivor's guilt over the fact that Ashley was left behind and killed, having prepared to sacrifice his own life for the rest of the team.

==== Mass Effect 2 ====
If Kaidan survives the events on Virmire, he will appear on the Normandy before it is destroyed by the Collector ship. Shepard will order him to an escape pod before the Normandy's demise. He will not appear again until Shepard's mission to the human colony, Horizon, having been stationed there after an anonymous tip that the colony would be attacked. He will express disappointment and anger that Shepard did not reach out to him during the two years since he/she was presumed dead and the fact that he/she is now working with Cerberus. Shepard will invite him to join the crew of the new Normandy, but Kaidan refuses, stating he does not trust Cerberus and never will. Following this encounter, he will send Shepard a message at the private terminal apologizing for his harsh words during the exchange only if she is still having a romantic relationship with Kaidan.

==== Mass Effect 3 ====
Kaidan will appear in Vancouver at the Alliance base before the Reaper attack. Following the invasion, Kaidan will accompany Lieutenant James Vega and Commander Shepard on a mission to Mars to find Asari information broker and Prothean scientific expert, Liara T'Soni. During the mission, Kaidan is critically injured by a high-tech Cerberus mech and is hospitalized on the Citadel. While recuperating in the hospital, Ambassador Udina makes Kaidan an offer to become a Spectre, which Shepard can encourage him to accept.

Shepard can choose to visit Kaidan following each main story mission and during this time the basis for a romance can be either established or re-established. Following a message from the Salarian Councilor to Commander Shepard regarding Councilor Udina's betrayal, Kaidan is assigned to protect the Council, something that pits him against Shepard when he comes to confront Udina. If Kaidan is unable to be convinced that Udina is guilty, either Shepard or one of his squadmates will shoot him. If Kaidan can be convinced, either he or Shepard will shoot Udina. In the aftermath, Shepard can either offer him a spot on the crew to resume a relationship if Shepard is female or start a gay relationship with a male Shepard, or send him to the Alliance to become a war asset.

If Kaidan accompanies Shepard on the final mission to the Conduit in London and the player has not accrued enough war asset points, Kaidan will die. If Kaidan survives and is in a relationship with Shepard, he will place a plaque on the memorial wall on the Normandy. If enough war points are accrued, Shepard will survive and Kaidan will not place the plaque, but instead will smile in reminiscence.

=== In other media ===
A fully voice acted version of the apology email Kaidan sent to Shepard following their meeting on Horizon in Mass Effect 2 was released by Raphael Sbarge as a sound file on November 24, 2011. Intended to be a Thanksgiving Day present for Mass Effect fandom, Sbarge said he did not anticipate that the sound file would go viral and that he would receive an overwhelming amount of praise from fans all over the world.

Kaidan is the protagonist of the fourth issue of the comic series Mass Effect: Foundation, which retells his time training at BAaT, an experimental group and a forerunner to the System Alliance's biotic training programs in the present day. The conditions at BAaT are depicted as poor, and he and his classmates have been treated badly by a turian instructor named Vyrnnus who is openly racist towards his human students. He falls in love with a girl named Rahna, but the potential for a relationship dissolves after he accidentally kills Vyrnnus in retaliation for breaking Rahna's arm during a training exercise gone wrong. After BAaT is shut down following the fatal accident, Kaidan enlisted with the Alliance Navy, and he is eventually transferred onboard the SSV Normandy.

== Reception ==
Kaidan Alenko's characterization throughout the Mass Effect trilogy have received a mixed to positive response from players and video game journalists. Player statistics released by BioWare in 2013 revealed that Kaidan was the least popular Mass Effect 3 squad member who was the choice of 1.5% of the player base. Liana Ruppert commented that Kaidan was one of the widely disliked or divisive characters in the Mass Effect series due to his "by-the-book" personality, and his perceived lack of characterization for players who do not follow his romance story arc in the first Mass Effect. Notably, PC Gamer staff do not approve of the character. Wes Fenlon explained in an article written shortly after the release of Mass Effect 3 that Kaidan sounded very similar to Carth Onasi, a character from Star Wars: Knights of the Old Republic who is also voiced by Raphael Sbarge, and he found Onasi to be very obnoxious. As a result, he did not care about whether Kaidan was a nuanced character and paid little attention to him during his playthroughs. Nevertheless, he praised BioWare's dedication to carry the player's decision to save or abandon Kaidan on Virmire through the entire trilogy, calling it "a landmark moment for interactive storytelling" and said that he felt "less of a content consumer and more of a collaborator in their storytelling" as a result. In a later article, he considers Kaidan to be marginally better than Jacob Taylor and called him "a boring male starter companion". Fenlon's colleague Ben Griffin and Alex Walker from Kotaku were both in agreement about Kaidan being their least liked BioWare character and called him "dull". GamesRadar's Jordan Baughman described Kaidan as "The Pile of Grey Sludge (aka The Male Support Character)" character archetype, typically encountered as the most boring companion character in BioWare titles who is "generic to the extreme".

Other sources have been more positive in their evaluation of the character. In Chapter 1 of the book Digital Love: Romance and Sexuality in Games, Michelle Clough presented a case study which illustrated how Kaidan is an example of the shifting portrayal of male sexualization in the original trilogy. She believed that the character's overall depiction in the series framed him as a good choice for Shepard as a romantic and sexual partner. Kristine Steimer from IGN said in 2010 that she enjoyed her conversations with Kaidan; she praised the character's loyalty as his best quality and looked forward to completing the character's romance arc with her Shepard in any further DLC content or sequels for the series. Alex Knapp, a staff writer at Forbes, initially had a self-described "irrational dislike" of Kaidan due to his experiences with the character in the first game. Knapp disclosed in a later article that he had completely changed his mind about Kaidan after completing Mass Effect 3 with him in his squad, praising his character development and also his gameplay utility during combat missions because his powers are well balanced. Liana Ruppert commented that her opinion of the character "changed dramatically" when she played as a female Shepard and commit to his romance arc from the first game.

Some commentators have commented that much of the fanbase missed out on Kaidan's growth as a character during Mass Effect 3. Daniel Horowitz, writing for VentureBeat, said Kaidan was the most overlooked character in the series and generally not marketed well by BioWare; he drew attention to the fact that the trilogy's promo art has historically focused on a male Shepard, and Ashley was featured prominently in promos for the first Mass Effect. Horowitz went into detail about Kaidan's story arc in the trilogy, and argued that while his subtle characterization and understated nature does not generate as much fan interest as Shepard's other companions, he is "the most developed, well-rounded and fully realized character in the Mass Effect universe". Ruppert said players who play as a male Shepard would have had a better context in connecting with the character if the option to romance him was available at the commencement of the trilogy. In an editorial published by This Is My Joystick, Bryony Stewart-Seume drew a comparison to Jane Eyre in order to highlight the actual quality and depth of game writing for the character. Writing for Fanbyte, Kenneth Shepard agreed that Kaidan is one of the series' best written characters, and opined that Kaidan's characterization was intentionally stunted in the original Mass Effect for players choosing a male Commander Shepard, which was an example of what he called an attempt to "create a heavily-gendered, heteronormative world" before Mass Effect 3. In 2015, Logo TV ranked Kaidan as the third on their list of the sexiest male video game characters.

Lynda Clark, who wrote the entry for the Virmire Survivor in the 2017 book 100 Greatest Video Game Characters., observed that Kaidan's backstory is reminiscent of a superhero origin story; while Ashley is statistically more likely to be chosen as the Virmire Survivor by players, Kaidan is preferred by a vocal and influential minority of Mass Effect fans who primarily favor the female version of Commander Shepard.

=== Same-sex romance option ===
A potential response to Kaidan as part of a romance event tree in Mass Effect 3, which is only available to a male player character.

BioWare's decision to offer Kaidan as a same-sex romance option for a male Shepard player character in Mass Effect 3 generated significant coverage about the sexuality of the aforementioned characters, and a broad discussion on the issue of LGBT themes in the Mass Effect series. Kotaku published an article on May 16, 2011, less than a day after developer Casey Hudson's announcement about the game's incorporation of same-sex romances, reporting that some players have spoken out about their concerns that certain characters that have been established over the course of one or both of Mass Effect 3's prequels may undergo "implausible and abrupt sexual transformations" at the expense of "narrative consistency and integrity". One user comment highlighted by the article specifically claimed that the character is "sometimes nervous with opposite sex but never with men".

Following Mass Effect 3's release, Kaidan's inclusion as a romance option for a male Shepard was received with near-universal acclaim by critics. Horowitz's article for VentureBeat argued that a male Shepard's "friendship, relationship and eventual partnership with Kaidan offers far more depth and reward than the one with Ashley, or arguably any other character in the game by a wide margin". The Advocate and Gay Community News named Kaidan one of the best queer characters from video games of all time, both praising BioWare's decision to allow players to pursue a same-sex relationship with him in 3 as progressive.

Conversely, Queerty noted in its positive coverage of the topic that there were some negative user-generated comments on Metacritic which focused criticism on the presence of gay male sex scenes in the game, as well as its possible correlation with the below-average Metacritic user rating for Mass Effect 3 at the time. Craig Takeuchi from the Georgia Straight reported on negative reception to the game's same-sex relationship content, which consisted of dismissive and homophobic comments which were posted on several websites. He compared the gaming world to the world of sports, which "has been slow and resistant to addressing homophobia or including gay content".

=== Themes and analysis ===
In Clough's case study, she observed that although Kaidan is presented as a love interest for a female Shepard in the first game who is conventionally attractive and has an appealing personality, there was little acknowledgment of the physical aspect of his appeal, and outside of a sex scene which mostly focuses on a female Shepard's body, little opportunity for the character to be appreciated in a sexual context. This is contrasted with Kaidan's more sexualized presentation in Mass Effect 3, where the character is shirtless in multiple scenes, and more emphasis is placed on the intimacy between him and Shepard. During one scene where Kaidan is reboarding the Normandy and still in a relationship with Shepard, the camera alternates quick cuts between a close up of Kaidan's buttocks and a close up of Shepard's gaze, indicating that she enjoys looking at him in a sexual way.

Denis Farr from Kotaku, who identifies as openly gay, decided to role-play his version of Shepard as a closeted male soldier who shows no interest in female or feminine characters throughout the series, alluding his character's experience to the United States government's former Don't ask, don't tell policy. He noted that he has to accept a willful suspension of belief concerning the gender and sexual politics of the world of Mass Effect: prior to the introduction of same-sex romance between male characters and openly homosexual characters in Mass Effect 3, he was unable to express his avatar character's romantic desires (which matches his own) in the game universe, and that his character's particular journey through Mass Effect 3, which involves a late blooming romance with Kaidan that was not possible in the game's prequels, (Note: Kaidan would justify his belated expression of romantic interest towards a male Shepard by telling him: "You were always so focused on the work back then. The mission was everything".) was a necessity born out of the series' options. He concluded that the Mass Effect's series' own evolution of its concept of male same-sex romances is a direct reflection of the real-life world's politics on gender and sexual identity, and that as time progressed, so did the series' sexual politics.

In his essay published in the 2017 book Queer Game Studies, Todd Harper compared Farr's experience to his own when attempting to interpret his version of Shepard as a queer character in a technologically advanced world where a human and an alien can have a relationship unquestioned and unchallenged by the wider society. As a character that can be romanced by either gender, Kaidan has what Harper terms "Schrödinger's sexuality", an observation he made that Kaidan's sexuality "exists in a sort of quantum superposition that the player can collapse into observed certainty by choosing to romance or not", and that it is "defined primarily by his relationship to Shepard".

== See also ==
- Gender representation in video games
