= Faunts =

Canadian electronic rock band

- Origin: Edmonton, Alberta, Canada
- Genres: Electronic rock, space rock, post-rock, dream pop
- Years active: 2000–present
- Label: Kinsella Recordings
- Members: Steven Batke; Tim Batke; Paul Arnusch
- Past members: Joel Hitchcock; Rob Batke; Scott Gallant

Faunts is an electronic rock band, formed in 2000 Edmonton, Alberta, Canada, by Paul Arnusch and brothers Steven and Tim Batke. Faunts creates ambient music by arranging electronic beats with rock music, synthesizers, and drums. In 2009 the band was described as "slow-motion shoegazers reborn as purveyors of luminous and deeply affecting electronic pop."

== History ==
Faunts was formed in the fall of 2000 by musicians Paul Arnusch, Steven Batke, and Tim Batke. Their debut album, High Expectations/Low Results, was released in 2005 by Friendly Fire Recordings and was met with a positive reception.

In 2005, the band began writing their first EP, M4. Faunts desired to have their music crafted to accompany short films for the Film and Video Arts Society. Keyboardist Joel Hitchcock and mixer Rob Batke joined the band, and Dave Swanson and Nathan Seattler assisted with writing the album's lyrics. M4 was released in 2007 and achieved notoriety when the song "M4, Pt. II" was featured in the final credits of BioWare's 2007 video game Mass Effect. This raised the band's profile and "a sizeable new audience was exposed to Faunts' moody, subdued melodies."

On November 18, 2008, Faunts released a remix album titled Faunts Remixed, featuring remixes by acts such as Mark Templeton and DVAS. This was followed by their second full studio album, Feel.Love.Thinking.Of, which was released on February 17, 2009, and is the result of songwriting over the course of touring across America. The song "Das Malefitz" was featured during the final credits of Mass Effect 3. On November 17, 2012, the band released Left Here Alone, described by a press release as "an offering of a handful of unreleased yet essential songs that fill in the empty spaces between High Expectations/Low Results and M4 in Faunts' evolutionary map. Listening to this record is like traveling through the band's back catalogue."

Between Feel.Love.Thinking.Of and Ostalgia, Tim Batke formed the band Duplekita with fourteen friends from other bands, and Rob Batke left Faunts indefinitely to pursue a solo career under the pseudonym Artisan Loyalist.

On February 12, 2016, Faunts announced the upcoming release of Ostalgia, "a five-volume compilation of new music." Volume 1, released August 12, 2016, is a five-part song titled "Thirty-Three," the sound of which hearkens back to the band's early work while exploring new musical territory. On September 9, 2017, Faunts announced on their Facebook page they were "Busy working on Volume 2 and are planning to release a new single soon."

On August 27, 2019, the band released a new single titled "There Will Be Blood".

== Members ==
=== Current ===
- Steven Batke - vocals, guitar
- Tim Batke - vocals, guitar, keyboard
- Paul Arnusch - drums

=== Former ===
- Joel Hitchcock - keyboard
- Rob Batke - keyboard, laptop
- Scott Gallant - bass

== Discography ==
=== Studio albums ===
- High Expectations/Low Results (October 18, 2005)
- Feel.Love.Thinking.Of (February 17, 2009)

=== EPs ===
- M4 (December 11, 2007)
- Left Here Alone (November 17, 2012)
- Ostalgia, Volume 1 (August 12, 2016)

=== Remix albums ===
- Remixed (November 18, 2008)

=== Singles ===
- "There Will Be Blood" (August 27, 2019)

== See also ==
- Music of Canada
- Canadian rock
- List of Canadian musicians
- List of bands from Canada
