= Game developer (disambiguation) =

A video game developer is an individual or company working on video game production.

Game developer may also refer to:

- Game Developer (magazine), a defunct monthly trade periodical for the video game industry
- Game Developer (website), formerly Gamasutra, the ongoing sister publication to the magazine of the same name
- Video game publisher, a company that develops video games
- Game designer, a member of game development team, responsible for game's design
- Game programmer, a member of game development team, responsible for game's codebase

== See also ==
- Game development
- Video game design
