= David & the Citizens =

Swedish rock band

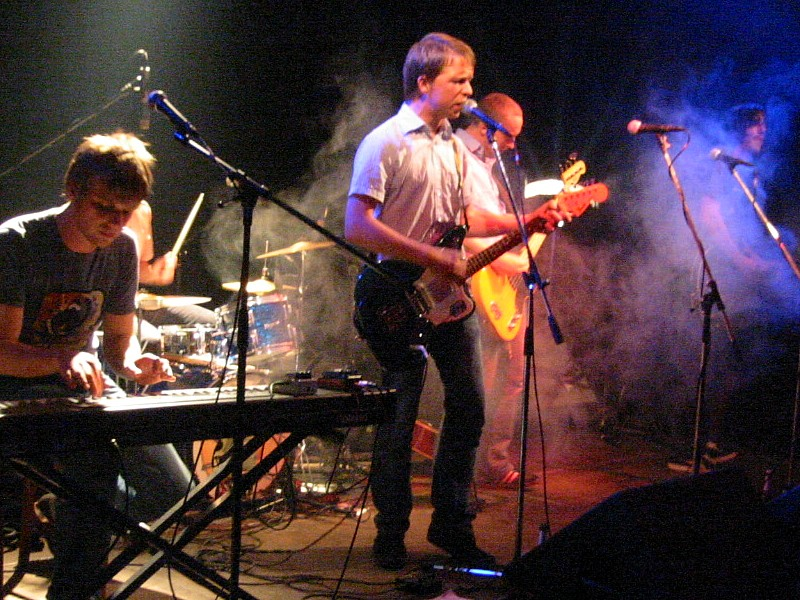
David & the Citizens 2004 in Potsdam (Germany)

David & the Citizens was a Swedish rock band formed in 1999 in Skåne.

== History ==
The band was created in 1999 by the singer and songwriter David Fridlund. With a couple of already-recorded songs he moved from Stockholm to Malmö. In a few weeks he had managed to form the band together with Mikael Carlsson, Jenny Wilson, and Karl-Jonas Winqvist, and perform with the band at the now-closed "Den blinda åsnan" (the Blind Donkey). The same year the band played at the Hultsfred festival and the Emmaboda festival. Jenny and Karl-Jonas left the band to focus whole-heartedly at their band First Floor Power in Stockholm, which led to Alexander Madsen, Conny Fridh and later also Magnus Bjerkert joining the band.

Their first, self-titled, EP was released on April 9, 2001 on Adrian Recordings. The same year another EP was released under the name I've Been Floating Upstream. The band also made their second performance at the Hultsfred festival that year. The debut album For all Happy Endings was released March 8, 2002, and soon after the EP Song Against Life whose title track lay several weeks on MTV:s Up North. In the summer of 2002 the band played at all the major festivals in Sweden as well as the Roskilde Festival in Denmark. In 2003 the band released their second album Until the Sadness is Gone, and in 2004 the EP Big Chill which also Mattias Alkberg appeared on. Until the Sadness is Gone was nominated for a Swedish Grammy Award in 2003/2004.

In 2006 the band released the DVD Let's Not Fall Apart 1999-2005 about the band's development up until today. Ironically, the band had lost two members, Alexander Madsen and Mikael Carlsson, at the time for the release. John Bjerkert joined the band on percussion, but the band is currently consisting of four members. The new constellation of David & the Citizens released a minialbum titled Are You In My Blood May 17, 2006. This is the first release on another label than Adrian Recordings (owned by bandmember Magnus Bjerkert). Instead the record is released on Lund based label Bad Taste Records.

In February 2007 David & the Citizens had yet another change of members. David Fridlund continued without John, Magnus and Conny. They parted after several years of growing apart mentally, opinion wise and musically. David continues with four new members TBA. On the 17 December 2007 David & the Citizens released an EP called I Saw My Reflection And I Didn't Recognize Myself with four new songs. The EP is free for downloading at the web page and some pictures and the lyrics are included. The listeners have the option to pay for the EP if they are willing to and instructions are included in the EP. David also assures that the band still exists and "will be around till the day I decide to quit. And that day is yet to come."

On August 10, 2008 David Fridlund announced on the David & the Citizens Myspace blog that the band is taking a break. He will simply be known as David Fridlund for a while.

In 2019, David announced that he started doing local shows and recording demos under the name of Citizens Band Orchestra.

2021 Hyllie Bryggeri announced the release of “Floating Upstream - American Pale Ale”. A beer named after the David & The Citizens song, “I’ve Been Floating Upstream Since We Parted”. An art exhibit with cravings by David himself, was held to celebrate the event.

In August 2022 the band reformed for a one-off performance featuring the original Grammy nominated line-up of the band at Malmo Festival, their first in over a decade.

== Discography (Swedish record releases) ==
=== Albums ===
- For All Happy Endings (2002)
- Until the Sadness is Gone (2003)
- Stop the Tape! Stop the Tape! (2006)

=== EPs ===
- David & the Citizens (2001)
- I've Been Floating Upstream (2001)
- Song Against Life (2002)
- New Direction (2003)
- Big Chill (2004)
- Are You in My Blood (2006)
- I Saw My Reflection and I Didn't Recognize Myself (2007)
- Untitled (year unknown)

=== Singles ===
- Pink Evening (Send Me Off...) (2002)
- Stop! (2002)
- The End (2003)
- Graycoated Morning (2003)

== Filmography ==
- Let's Not Fall Apart 1999-2005 (2006)

== Members ==
- David Fridlund - vocals, piano, guitar

=== Former members ===
- Conny Fridh - bass, background vocals
- Magnus Bjerkert - trumpet, organ, piano, guitar
- John Bjerkert - percussions, background vocals
- Alexander Madsen - guitar
- Mikael Carlsson - percussions, background vocals
- Jenny Wilson - Guitar, backing vocals
- Karl-Jonas Winqvist - Drums and percussion
