= M4 (EP) =

EP by Faunts
- Released: September 22, 2006
- Genre: Electronic rock, space rock, post-rock, dream pop, shoegazing
- Length: 39:23
- Label: Friendly Fire Recordings

Faunts chronology
High Expectations/Low Results (2005)	M4 (2006)	Feel. Love. Thinking. Of (2009)

Professional ratings
Review scores
Source	Rating
PopMatters	6/10
Tiny Mix Tapes	3.5/5 stars

M4 is an EP recorded by Canadian indie rock band Faunts in 2006.

== Track listing ==
1. "M4 (Part II)" – 8:18
2. "Sleepwalker" – 7:43
3. "M4 (Part I)" – 9:18
4. "Meno Mony Falls" – 5:54
5. "Of Nature" – 8:08

== Music video ==
The first theatrically styled music video the band ever filmed was made for "M4 (Part II)". It was directed by Ryan Bosworth and came with a limited amount of hard-copy M4 EPs. The video features footage of the band playing interspersed with a visual representation of the song realized by a personified hierarchy of crabs, wherein a single crab wishes to dominate a space of sand dune on a beach. In the end, the single crab becomes the only one left but, reflecting the song's lyrics, the crab is devoured by a bigger predator than itself - a seagull.

== Personnel ==
Faunts

- Steven Batke – vocals, guitar
- Tim Batke – vocals, guitar, keyboard
- Joel Hitchcock – keyboard
- Paul Arnusch – drums

Additional

- Engineer: Graham Lessard
- Mixed by Graham Lessard and Faunts
- Mastered by Phil Demetro
- Artwork Design by Tim Batke and Lindsay Batke
