= Life Inside Out =

- Theatrical release poster
- Directed by: Jill D'Agnenica
- Written by: Maggie Baird; Lori Nasso
- Produced by: Tessa Bell
- Starring: Maggie Baird; Finneas O'Connell; David Cowgill; Lori Nasso; William Dennis Hunt; Goh Nakamura
- Cinematography: Guido Frenzel
- Edited by: Philip Malamuth; Jill D'Agnenica
- Music by: Elliott Goldkind
- Distributed by: Monarch Home Video
- Release dates: October 18, 2013 (Heartland); October 17, 2014 (United States)
- Running time: 102 minutes
- Country: United States
- Language: English

Life Inside Out is a 2013 American independent film directed by Jill D'Agnenica, and written by Maggie Baird and Lori Nasso. It stars Baird, her son Finneas O'Connell, David Cowgill, Nasso, William Dennis Hunt, and Goh Nakamura. The film premiered in competition at the 2013 Heartland Film Festival on October 18, 2013, winning both the Crystal Heart Award for Narrative Feature and Best Premiere. It went on to screen at 20 more film festivals, winning 15 awards. The film had a limited theatrical release starting on October 17, 2014, and was released on DVD and VOD on April 21, 2015, by Monarch Home Video. In 2022, the film was re-released by Vertical Entertainment for rental or purchase across major video on demand platforms.

== Plot ==
A mother of three teenaged sons, Laura Shaw (Maggie Baird) rediscovers her old guitar hidden under the bed, which reignites her love of songwriting. She starts going to open mic nights, bringing her sensitive youngest son, Shane (Finneas O'Connell) along with her. Her first performance is a disaster. Shane, who has been sullen and cut off from his family and friends, shows an unexpected interest in her music and he encourages her to stick with it. She continues to go to open mic nights, bringing Shane and gets more confident as she plays. Slowly her confidence spills over into her personal life as well and her relationships with her family begin to shift. Moreover, soon Shane, too, begins playing guitar and writing songs of his own. With the help of new friends at the club and YouTube videos, he quickly develops his skills, surprising Laura and the entire family. Through music, they develop a connection to each other which not only brings them closer together, it also brings them closer to the ones that they love.

== Cast ==
- Maggie Baird as Laura Cushman Shaw
- Finneas O'Connell as Shane Shaw
- David Cowgill as Mike Shaw
- Lori Nasso as Lydia Cushman
- William Dennis Hunt as Bill Cushman
- Goh Nakamura as "Uncle" Sam Kansaki
- Orson Ossman as Devon Shaw
- Roscoe Brandon as Eli Shaw
- Emma Bell as Keira
- Alexandra Wilson as Vicky
- Patrick O'Connell as Skip
- Emily Jordan as Lucy
- Kalilah Harris as Chloe
- Joe Hart as Wayne

== Featured musicians ==
- Xenia as Xenia
- Goh Nakamura as "Uncle" Sam Kansaki
- Yogi Lonich as Yogi
- Steve McMorran as Steve
- Cindy Shapiro as Cherelle
- Emma Bell as Keira
- Joe Hart as Wayne

== Production ==
Much of Life Inside Out was inspired by Maggie Baird and Lori Nasso's real experiences performing at open-mic nights. Maggie Baird and Finneas O'Connell are real life mother and son. Baird and O'Connell wrote all of their own songs that appear in the movie. In addition, the filmmakers enlisted other singer-songwriters to play their music in the open mic night scenes and used the work of many others as source music. The bulk of the movie's budget was secured via a successful Kickstarter campaign in 2012, raising over US$41,000 (equivalent to $57,000 in 2025) toward the production of the film.

== Filming ==
The movie was shot in and around Los Angeles in 15 and a half days on a Red Epic digital camera by cinematographer Guido Frenzel. The club scenes were shot at Los Angeles' Club Fais Do-Do and the home scenes were shot at Baird's actual home.

== Release ==
The film played at 20 film festivals including Heartland Film Festival, Cleveland International Film Festival, Phoenix Film Festival, San Luis Obispo International Film Festival, Palm Beach International Film Festival, and Port Townsend Film Festival, winning 15 awards including 4 best narrative feature awards and 4 audience awards. The film had a limited theatrical release starting on October 17, 2014, and was released on DVD and VOD on April 21, 2015 by Monarch Home Video. In 2022 Life Inside Out was rereleased by Vertical Entertainment across streaming platforms.

== Soundtrack ==
No.	Title	Artist	Length
1.	"Superhero"	The Slightlys	3:54
2.	"For Every Road"	Maggie Baird	3:31
3.	"Mask of Lies"	The Slightlys	2:46
4.	"Let's Take it Slow"	Maggie Baird	3:58
5.	"Who's that Old Gal?"	Maggie Baird	3:24
6.	"Just a Little Drop of Poison"	Maggie Baird	3:48
7.	"Call Me When You Find Yourself"	Finneas O'Connell and Maggie Baird	4:09
8.	"Don't Forget Me"	The Slightlys	2:29
9.	"I Know"	Maggie Baird	3:38
10.	"Maybe I'm Losing My Mind"	Finneas O'Connell	3:40
11.	"Biggest Fan"	Maggie Baird	3:02
12.	"Your Mother's Favorite"	Finneas O'Connell	5:11
13.	"Call Me When You Find Yourself (Credits Version)"	Finneas O'Connell and Maggie Baird	3:42
14.	"Hiding Places"	Xenia	4:04
15.	"Long Time Coming"	Yogi	3:46
16.	"Here's a Secret"	Goh Nakamura	3:00
17.	"Ring the Bells"	Steve McMorran	4:43
18.	"Until Today"	Yvonne Meek	3:52
19.	"Firecracker"	Frentik	3:24
20.	"So Easily"	Yogi	3:08
21.	"Close My Eyes"	Hello Elettra	3:18
22.	"How Many Days"	Joshua Smith	3:20
23.	"A Boy"	Chase Bell	2:44
24.	"Belle Louise"	Dustone Cinema	8:17
25.	"I'm Not Crazy"	Jakey Lee	4:25
26.	"No One Loves Me Like You Do"	James Paige Morrison	3:25
27.	"Larry the Magnificent"	Larry Treadwell	2:00
28.	"4AM"	Forty Feet Tall	4:32
Total length:			1:45:10

== Reception ==
On review aggregator Rotten Tomatoes, the film holds an approval rating of 67% based on 9 reviews, with an average rating of 6.67. On Metacritic, the film has a weighted average score of 57 out of 100, based on 4 critics, indicating "mixed or average" reviews.

The non-profit family ratings association The Dove Foundation gave Life Inside Out its highest rating of 5 doves, saying, "this is a remarkable story with wonderful music." Common Sense Media wrote, "Parents need to know that love, respect, and acceptance within the family are the values that Life Inside Out holds close to its heart." giving it 3 stars. Gary Goldstein of Los Angeles Times said in his review, ""Life Inside Out" is a gentle, poignant drama whose heart and head are squarely in the right place. Engaging, naturalistic performances and nicely explored real-world issues add to this absorbing film's down-to-earth appeal." Katherine Vu of LA Weekly called it "A compelling tale." Sheri Linden of The Hollywood Reporter wrote, "The earnest film's straightforwardness and down-to-earth characters — especially the lead performance by Maggie Baird — have a gentle appeal" but added, "its tendency to spell out every emotion and theme in on-the-nose dialogue undercuts its potential impact at nearly every turn." Ben Kenigsberg wrote in The New York Times that Life Inside Out "is so earnest that Hollywood overkill might have been welcome." Film Actually stated, "Baird and O'Connell are a joy to watch, as their acting styles complement each other like a perfect duet. Their actual musical duets are beautiful too, contributing to the film's winning soundtrack. With its pleasant music, sincere performances and heartwarming script, this lovely film is one of 2015's first highlights."
