= Maggie Baird =

American actress (born 1959)

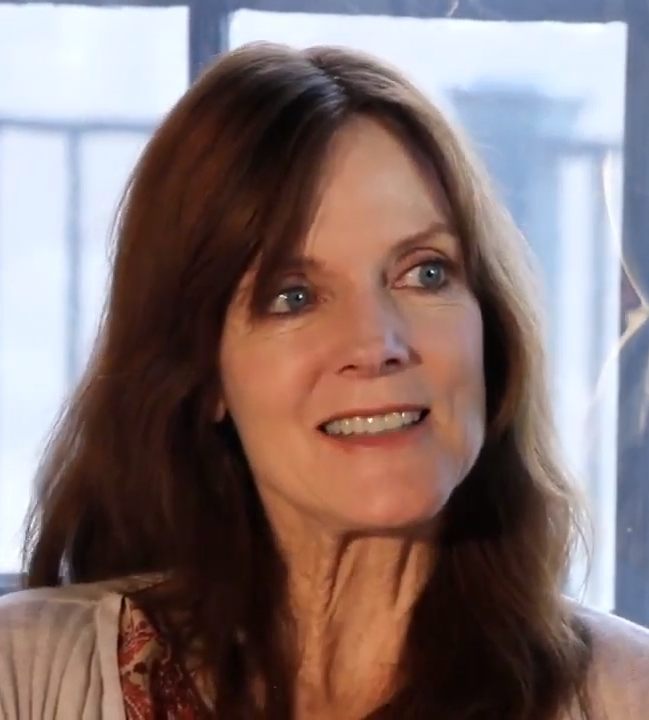
- Baird in an interview in 2014
- Born: Maggie May Baird; March 29, 1959 (age 67); Fruita, Colorado, U.S.
- Education: University of Utah (BFA)
- Occupations: Actress, singer-songwriter
- Years active: 1981–present
- Spouse: Patrick O'Connell (m. 1995)
- Children: Finneas O'Connell; Billie Eilish
- Relatives: Brian Baird (brother)

Maggie May Baird (born March 29, 1959) is an American actress, activist, and singer-songwriter. She grew up in Colorado performing music, and studied theater and dance at the University of Utah, before moving to New York City, where she performed on Broadway. She made her television debut in 1981 in the soap opera Another World and her film debut in the 1989 feature An Innocent Man.

Baird continued to act in television and film after moving to Los Angeles in 1991, and became a member and teacher at the Groundlings, a troupe and improvisational theatre school. She acted in 2000s television series such as Bones, The X-Files and Six Feet Under, and provided the voices of Samara in the video game series Mass Effect, and various characters in the Saints Row game series. In 2009, Baird released her debut studio album, We Sail.

Baird married Patrick O'Connell in 1995, with whom she has two children: musicians Finneas O'Connell and Billie Eilish. She wrote and co-starred with her son Finneas in the 2013 film Life Inside Out, which garnered Baird critical acclaim for her performance. In 2016, she edited the music video for "Six Feet Under" for her daughter Billie.

== Early life ==
Maggie May Baird was born on March 29, 1959 to Edith (Shaw) and William Norton Baird. Baird was born and raised in Fruita, Colorado. Baird learned the piano and guitar as a teenager. Her older brother is politician Brian Baird. She graduated from Fruita Monument High School in 1977. While Baird was in her 20s, her mother died following a heart attack. Her father also died in 2001 after battling idiopathic pulmonary fibrosis. Baird studied theater and dance at the University of Utah before later moving to New York City.

== Career ==
Baird made her debut television appearance in 1981, playing a supporting role in the American soap opera Another World. After moving to New York City, she performed in the 1985 revival of The Iceman Cometh on Broadway, and several Off-Broadway shows. After several years in New York City, Baird was cast in a play that took place in Anchorage, Alaska, where she met her future husband, Patrick O'Connell on set. In 1991, Baird moved to Los Angeles, California, where she acted in television and film productions such as L.A. Law, Murphy Brown, Walker, Texas Ranger and Picket Fences before spending nine months touring with The Heidi Chronicles in 1990, where she played the role of one of Heidi's friends. She played Taylor Baldwin on the soap opera As the World Turns in 1987 before making her film debut as Stacy in An Innocent Man in 1989.

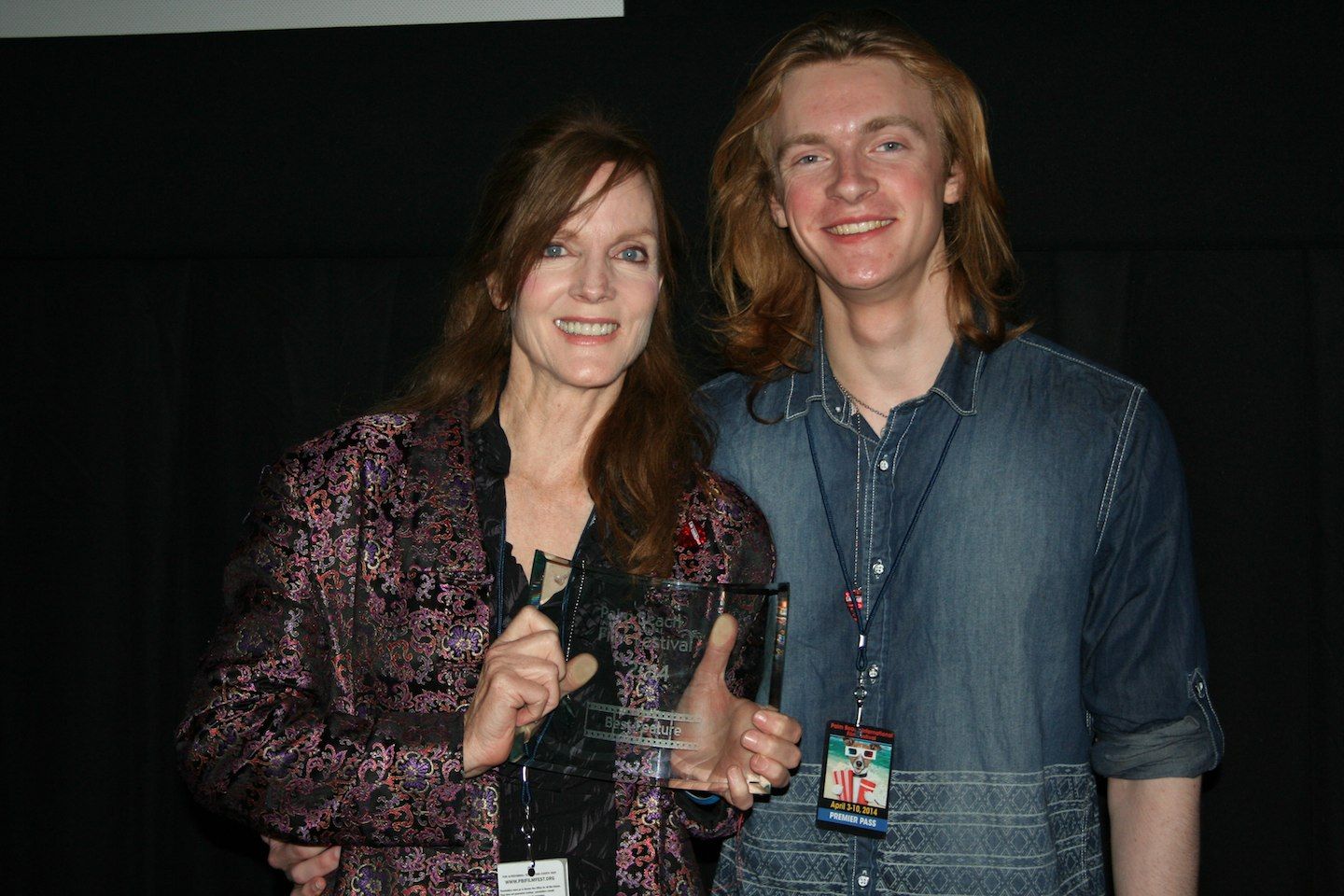
Baird and her son, Finneas, promoting Life Inside Out in 2014

From 1994 to 2000, Baird was a member and teacher at the Groundlings, an improvisational and sketch comedy troupe and school in Los Angeles. While at the Groundlings, Baird taught and performed with actors such as Will Ferrell, Kristen Wiig and Melissa McCarthy, becoming McCarthy's first improv teacher. Baird has been a voice actress in video games such as the Mass Effect series, the Saints Row series, the EverQuest II series, Lightning Returns: Final Fantasy XIII, Rogue Galaxy and Vampire: The Masquerade – Redemption.

Some of her notable acting roles from the 2000s to 2010s are Sharon Pearl in The X-Files in 2000, Sandra Hicks in Bones in 2009, Andrea Kuhn in Six Feet Under in 2005, and the asari Samara from the original Mass Effect trilogy. In March 2009, Baird released her debut studio album We Sail, an eleven-track country record.

Baird wrote, co-produced, acted and provided the soundtrack for the film Life Inside Out which was released in October 2013. The film, which explores the relationship between a mother and son through music, features Baird's real-life son Finneas. Gary Goldstein from Los Angeles Times wrote "A beautiful demonstration of a mother's love concludes this special little film on a hugely touching note."

In 2016, Baird edited the music video for the US gold-certified song "Six Feet Under" by her daughter, Billie Eilish. Baird portrayed Zach Galifianakis's sister in a deleted scene from the 2019 film Between Two Ferns: The Movie.

In 2020, amid the start of the COVID-19 pandemic, Baird, with the help of her two children, launched Support + Feed, a nonprofit organization that aims to provide plant-based meals to those suffering from food insecurity. The intent of this organization is to address the climate crisis, food equity, and food insecurity.

== Personal life ==
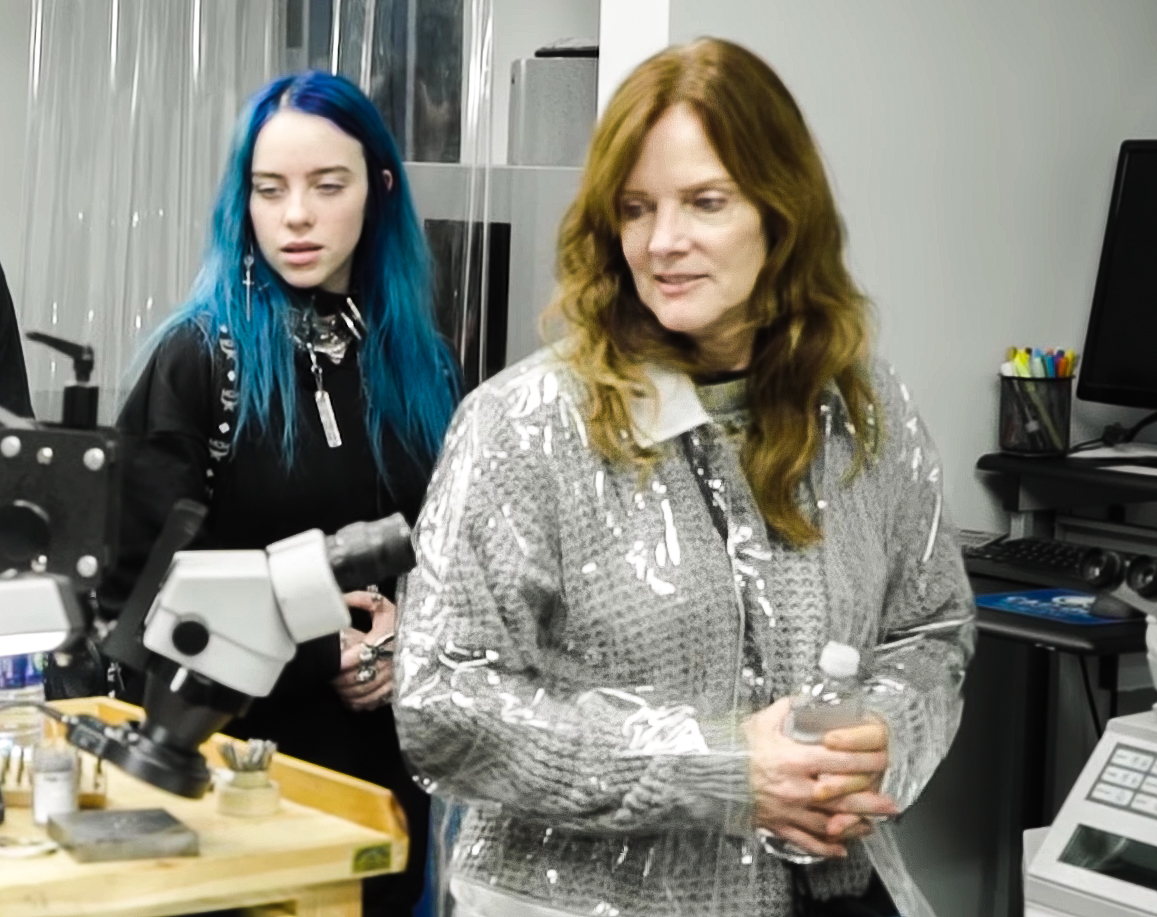
Baird and her daughter Billie Eilish in Atlanta in November 2018

Baird is a hobby musician and has recorded two CDs, including We Sail, which is available on iTunes. Baird was a teacher for Music Together for six years and made music a substantial part of her children's lives.

In 1984, Baird met actor Patrick O'Connell while on the set of a play in Anchorage, Alaska. After 11 years of dating, Baird and O'Connell married in 1995. On July 30, 1997, Baird gave birth to the couple's first child, Finneas O'Connell. On December 18, 2001, Baird gave birth to the couple's second child, Billie Eilish O'Connell, in Highland Park, Los Angeles. Baird and O'Connell decided to homeschool their children, with Baird stating: "Homeschooling allows us to let them do the things that they really love to do and not have a giant academic schedule on top of it."

Both of their children are successful singer-songwriters, music producers, and actors. Baird and O'Connell have been supportive of both Eilish and Finneas's careers. As of 2021, they reside in Highland Park, Los Angeles.

While talking about her own religion in 2020, Eilish described her family, which includes Baird, as not religious.

== Filmography ==
=== Television ===
Year	Title	Role	Notes
1981	Another World	Rhonda Sadowski	Recurring
1987–1988	As the World Turns	Taylor Baldwin	Recurring
1992	L.A. Law	Rachel Malone	Episode: "Back to the Suture"
1994	Walker, Texas Ranger	Jessica Ann Pritchard	Episode: "The Reunion"
1994	Picket Fences	Marjorie Engrams	3 episodes
1996	The Naked Truth	French Filmmaker's Wife	Episode: "Hollywood Honours Male Prostitute"
1996	Chicago Hope	Gloria Neal	Episode: "A Day in the Life"
1998	Buddy Faro		Episode: "Get Me Cody Swift"
1998	L.A. Doctors		Episode: "Leap of Faith"
1999	Crashbox	Verity	Voice
1999	Friends	Casting Director No. 2	Episode: "The One Where Joey Loses His Insurance"
1999	Jack & Jill	Donna	Episode: "Fear and Loathing in Gotham"
2000	JAG	Vera Duke	Episode: "Surface Warfare"
2000	Cover Me	Christy Ann Harnick	Episode: "In Plain Sight"
2000	Curb Your Enthusiasm	Couple #1	Episode: "AAMCO"
2000	The X-Files	Sharon Pearl	Episode: "Invocation"
2002	The West Wing	Ms. Carney, Network News President #3	Episode: "The Black Vera Wang"
2002	Birds of Prey	Mother	2 episodes
2003	Charmed	Doctor	Episode: "The Day The Magic Died"
2003	The Brotherhood of Poland, New Hampshire		Episode: "Little Girl Lost"
2005	Six Feet Under	Andrea Kuhn	Episode: "A Coat of White Primer"
2005	Everwood	Mrs. Harcourt	Episode: "Put on a Happy Face"
2008	The Starter Wife	Blair	Episode: "The Remains of the Snow Day"
2009	Bones	Sandra Hicks	Episode: "Double Trouble in the Panhandle"
2011	Days of Our Lives	Female T.V. Voice	Episode #1.11586
2013	See Dad Run	Hippie Mom	Episode: "See Dad Host a Play Group"

=== Film ===
Year	Title	Role	Notes
1989	Roe vs. Wade		TV movie
1989	An Innocent Man	Stacy	
1995	Siringo	Blanche	
1995	White Dwarf	Scarred Cultist	
1999	Michael Jordan: An American Hero	Reporter	TV movie
1999	The Big Split	Tracy's Mom	
2000	Dropping Out	Waitress	
2000	Running Mates	Newscaster #2	
2001	Manic	Rebecca	
2004	Sake Bottle Battle	Cathy Gaffney	Short film
2005	Marilyn Hotchkiss' Ballroom Dancing and Charm School	Linda Sue	
2006	Eragon	Additional voices	
2011	Ice Age: A Mammoth Christmas	Additional voices	Short film
2013	Life Inside Out	Laura	Written, co-produced, soundtrack
2016	I Am Be	Demeter	Short film
2021	Billie Eilish: The World's a Little Blurry	Herself	Documentary
2026	Billie Eilish – Hit Me Hard and Soft: The Tour (Live in 3D)	Herself	Concert film, also producer

=== Video games ===
Year	Title	Role
1999	Battlezone II: Combat Commander	Female Ensemble
2000	Vampire: The Masquerade – Redemption	Anezka
2004	EverQuest II	
2005	Rogue Galaxy	Amni Rhyza
2005	EverQuest II: Desert of Flames	
2006	Saints Row	Stilwater's Resident
2008	Saints Row 2	Various
2010	Mass Effect 2	Samara
2012	Mass Effect 3	Samara
2013	Lightning Returns: Final Fantasy XIII	Additional voices

== Discography ==
Title	Album details
We Sail	Released: March 30, 2009; Label: Self-released; Formats: CD, digital download, streaming

Grammy Awards== Awards and nominations ==

Year	Organization	Award	Work	Result	Ref.
2013	Heartland International Film Festival	Crystal Heart Award for Dramatic Feature	Life Inside Out	Won	
2013	Heartland International Film Festival	Crystal Heart Award for Best Premiere	Life Inside Out	Won	
2014	Phoenix Film Festival	Cox Audience Award	Life Inside Out	Won	
2014	Phoenix Film Festival	Best Picture	Life Inside Out	Nominated	
2014	San Luis Obispo International Film Festival	Best Narrative Feature	Life Inside Out	Won	
2027	Grammy Awards	Best Music Film	Hit Me Hard and Soft: The Tour	Pending	
