= Samara (Mass Effect) =

Companion character in the Mass Effect series

- Mass Effect character
- Samara as she appears in Mass Effect 2
- First game: Mass Effect 2 (2010)
- Voiced by: Maggie Baird

In-universe information
- Race: Asari
- Class: Justicar
- Skill: Biotics

Samara is a fictional character from BioWare's Mass Effect franchise, who serves as a party member (or "squadmate") in Mass Effect 2. She is an asari, a feminine species in the Mass Effect universe who are naturally inclined towards biotics, the mental ability to manipulate dark energy and generate various psychokinetic effects. Samara is a member of a highly respected and feared ascetic order of mystic warriors known as the Justicars. Samara's features were based on model Rana McAnear, and she is voiced by American actress Maggie Baird.

During his time working on Mass Effect 2, video game developer Brian Kindegran developed lore about the Justicar Code as well as biological deviants in asari society known as the Ardat-Yakshi, and used these story elements to build Samara's backstory. Samara's loyalty mission involves her daughter Morinth, an asari afflicted with a genetic condition that makes Ardat-Yakshi like her aggressive sexual predators and voracious killers. Depending on the player's actions, either Samara or Morinth will be killed, and the survivor will stay with the team and be loyal to player character Commander Shepard. Samara may also appear in a small role in Mass Effect 3 if she survives the events of Mass Effect 2.

Samara has received varied commentary from critics, with some noting that her extremist stance and complex motivations contribute a more interesting character element to the series narrative, while others consider her character to be underdeveloped or falls short of its potential, partly due to her rigid commitment to her Justicar Code.

== Creation and development ==
Samara's writer for Mass Effect 2 was Brian Kindregan, who developed additional lore like the Justicar Code and the Ardat-Yakshi as part of his work on Samara's backstory. Inspired by a pre-existing in-game codex entry about how asari mate, where they engage in a process called "melding" with their romantic partner, Kindregan used it as the basis to explore the "awful, invasive" side of the asari mating experience. Kindregan considers her children's diagnosis as Ardat-Yakshi, a term in asari culture for biological deviants who cause their partners' deaths when mating, and Morinth's defiance against the laws which regulate her kind, to be the character's "defining moment" as she chose to respond by exerting "an iron-willed self control" and find purpose in her life through her role as a problem solver. During an interview, Kindregan illustrated his point by contrasting Samara's personality with another squadmate, Jack: the latter seeks to control her environment out of the desire for her own safety, whereas Samara "seeks to control herself so that it was her own survival mechanism".

Kindregan worked closely with lead level designer Dusty Everman to develop Samara's side quest in Mass Effect 2, which involves her hunt for Morinth. The earliest draft of the side quest involved Shepard breaking into the compound of an underground cult led by Morinth and fight through waves of hostile cultists. The setting of the loyalty mission was later moved from Morinth's cult, which is still referenced within in-game dialogue, to the Afterlife nightclub on Omega. One of two companion loyalty missions from Mass Effect 2 which do not involve any combat sequences, Kindregan noted that he took Everman's suggestion to frame the mission as an experience where the players have to go in and impress someone, "not by being too violent but by finding this really careful balance between being cool and violent and all these things". Kindregan wrote what he described as a "puzzle conversation" between the player and Morinth, where the goal is to secure her attention and acceptance of Shepard as part of a trap set up by Samara. Kindregan tried to "fully embrace Samara’s point of view" when writing the character, because Samara is not only motivated by the punishment of her daughter for her refusal to live a life of abstinence and asceticism in order to contain her murderous impulses, but also because she sees herself as the source of Morinth's condition and feels the need to redeem herself by ending her daughter's life, a sentiment shared by Morinth who blames Samara and thinks of her as a hypocrite.

The end state of the mission, where players must side with either Samara or Morinth, went through a revision during development as Morinth was not originally intended to be a look-alike to Samara and was to have her own unique character model and arc. Although this scenario presents Samara as the ideal image of the "Paragon" while Morinth is a "Renegade" in its most extreme form within the context of the game's morality system, Kindregan took the view that there is no preferred outcome as to players should choose to side with. Although Morinth was never intended to be a sympathetic character as she is a serial killer, Kindregan emphasized that both Samara and Shepard have committed numerous extrajudicial killings themselves: the former out of her obligation to the Justicar Code and the latter at their discretion as a Spectre in service to the council. In his view, this is not dissimilar to certain historical figures who have killed many people by relying on rules or legislation which legitimize their actions. Kindregan maintained that he wanted to craft an emotionally and morally nuanced situation, and to subvert player's expectations of what they perceived Samara's reaction would be at the completion of the mission; instead of being in a celebratory mood, she is depicted as shattered by the demise of her daughter, whom she calls the best and bravest of her children.

BioWare never planned for a romance subplot with Samara, which Kindregan supported on a personal level. Aside from her exclusive level of commitment to the Justicar Code and being a lot older biologically than the player character, Kindregan considered Samara to be a character who had experienced a lot of trauma throughout her lifetime and has achieved a mental state where she is completely centered and self-aware, rendering her emotionally incompatible with Shepard. As a core part of her self-control, she is deliberately written to carry herself with subtle insinuations during conversations, where she makes a choice to let the player character into a deeper point during the midst of a discussion, but "not all the way". Kindregan suggested that this is best exemplified during quasi-romantic interactions between the player character and Samara, and while she may develop feelings for Shepard which she cannot deny, it is her decision and self control that hold her back from acting on them as opposed to a literal interpretation of the Code.

=== Design and portrayal ===
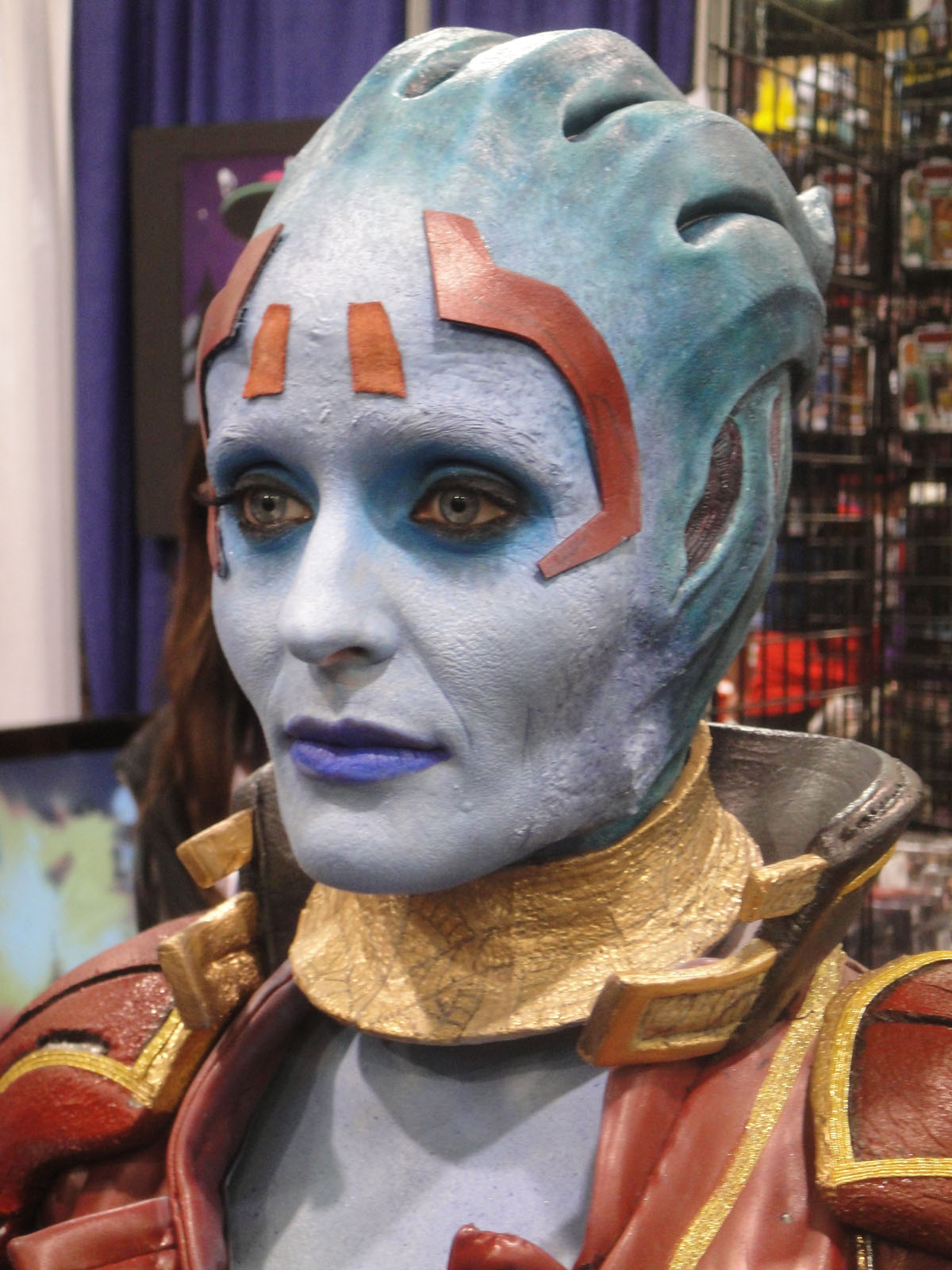
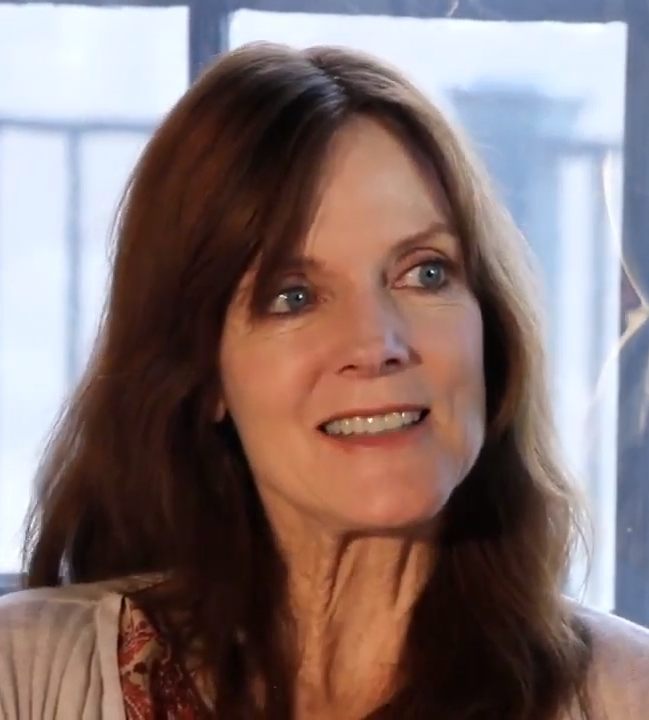
Rana McAnear (left) and Maggie Baird (right) are Samara's face model and voice actress respectively.

Samara was noted by BioWare staff as one of the most difficult characters to finalize design-wise; a trial-and-error approach was used where the character artists would try to produce as many rough ideas and sketches onto a page as possible to figure out what makes Samara iconic and stand out as a character, and the final design would be polished until the team has reached a consensus. Variations for her head accessory have been considered, including religious headgear and regal-looking crown-like adornments. For airless or toxic environments, the team decided to go with a small breather device to allow for more facial expression after various designs were considered. Samara's revealing clothing in her final design indicates that her primary method of defense is her uniform's "near-invisible kinetic-barrier technology".

Samara's facial features is based on the likeness of model Rana McAnear, who subsequently made appearances in fan conventions dressed up as the character. Her voice actress is Maggie Baird.

== Appearances ==
As part of a joint operation with the anthropocentric organization Cerberus to recruit allies and combat the Collector threat in Mass Effect 2, Shepard receives a dossier for Samara, a member of an ascetic organization of vigilantes known as the Justicars who are sanctioned to operate in asari space and brutally punish individuals they pursue. Shepard travels to Illium to meet Samara, where she is found investigating the Eclipse mercenary group who smuggled her daughter Morinth off-world. Samara joins Shepard's squad after she is aided in her investigation, and explains that she is on a quest to track down and stop Morinth, who has been killing innocents by burning out their nervous systems during sexual encounters as a result of her Ardat-Yakshi condition. To commit herself fully to the Justicar Code, Samara has forsworn all possessions and family to fight for absolute justice. Samara's investigation eventually produced a lead indicating that Morinth is last seen at the V.I.P. section of the Afterlife nightclub on the Omega space station. Samara and Shepard formulate a plan in which Shepard attracts the attention of Morinth and is taken to her apartment, where Morinth is to be distracted until Samara moves in for the kill. Regardless of how well the mission goes, Shepard may only save either Morinth or Samara, and can potentially lose both of them. If Shepard sides with Morinth, Samara is killed by her daughter, who commits herself to Shepard's cause and takes to posing as Samara on The Normandy due to their near-identical appearance.

Samara returns in a small role in Mass Effect 3, providing she survived the events of Mass Effect 2. While investigating the disappearance of asari commandos at a monastery home to Ardat-Yakshi, Shepard discovers that it has been overrun by Reaper ground forces, who are turning its residents into husk-like monsters called Banshees. Shepard encounters Samara at the monastery, where she reveals that she is looking for her other two children Rila and Falere in hopes of finding out what happened. Shepard and Samara manage to locate her children, and discovers that Rila is wounded and under the influence of Reaper indoctrination. Shepard activates a bomb the asari commandos brought and manages to escape with Samara and Falere, while Rila manages to break free of Reaper control and holds Reaper forces off long enough to trigger the bomb, sacrificing herself in the process. Once outside, Samara tells Falere that the Justicar Code forbids an Ardat-Yakshi living outside the monastery, and since there is no monastery she must die. However, Samara cannot bring herself to kill her last surviving child, so she chooses to kill herself instead. If the player triggers the prompt for a Paragon Interrupt, Shepard restrains Samara and Falere states that she will stay behind at the monastery and evade capture by the Reapers. Samara, grateful to Shepard, promises to assist the Commander in the war effort. If Samara killed herself, or did not survive the events of Mass Effect 2, Shepard may choose to either spare or kill Falere.

Samara is listed on the Normandy SR-2's memorial wall on the Crew Deck in Mass Effect 3 if the character perishes at any point during the overarching narrative of the original trilogy. Like other past and present surviving squad members, Samara makes an appearance in the Mass Effect 3: Citadel DLC pack, which adds character moments which will vary in content depending on dialogue and event choices. If Shepard built an intimate connection with Samara in Mass Effect 2 and is invited to the apartment in Citadel, she may acknowledge it and gives Shepard a kiss and warm embrace if encouraged. Samara is also available as a temporary squadmate in the Armax Arsenal Arena combat simulator.

== Reception ==
Describing the character as an interesting "Judge Dredd with a serial killer daughter", Evan Lahti from PC Gamer said not only is Samara the sole companion character in the series who deals with moral absolutes due to her strictly adherence to the Justicar Code, she is also one of the series most tragic characters in the Shakespearean manner due to the potential outcome of her story arc in Mass Effect 3. Cian Maher from TheGamer praised Samara's loyalty mission as one of the game's most distinct both in its design and atmosphere, and that there is a continuation of the ambition and intent it displays in the non-combat set pieces of Mass Effect 3. Maher further noted that the dilemma of who had the more justifiable position made for "a compelling narrative core to an even more compelling quest concept". Stacey Henley, also from TheGamer, argued that Samara's "romance" may be the series' best due to its subtle nature and the quality conversations she offers players. Henley noted that the game asks the player for a lot of commitment for what appears to be a limited payoff, as there is no lengthy romance event tree and it does not "reward" players with a sex scene; what players do get is an intimate kiss from a woman who has to shoulder a lot of responsibilities and wants to meet Shepard halfway, which in her opinion is a realistic and understated depiction of love.

Conversely, Tom Senior who is also from PC Gamer criticized Samara as a "boring space paladin" and felt that dealing with her is more akin to interacting with dogma as opposed to a person. Senior was of the view that her personality has been entirely subsumed by her Code in spite of her fascinating backstory, and as a result the player character's friendship with her could never evolve into anything meaningful. Grace Benfell from Vice drew an unfavorable comparison between the in-universe portrayal of Samara and the Ardat-Yakshi to the historical social hardships and indifference from health authorities faced by LGBTQ individuals as a result of the initial outbreak of the HIV/AIDS epidemic; for Benfell, "Morinth is a parallel to the many people who died. In place of the uncaring state is Samara’s fist."

Alyssa Favreau from The Mary Sue found herself drawn to the character's immense power and "quiet clarity of purpose" in terms of her moral compass, but criticized BioWare's decision to not offer Samara as a full-fledged romance option. Favreau reasoned that while it makes sense for Samara to reject Shepard's advances due to their large age disparity, her presentation and the lack of other meaningful same sex romance options in Mass Effect 2 inevitably played into a common trope involving queer women in popular media, where they are employed to "titillate audiences but never see their stories given narrative importance". Carlen Lavigne cited Samara as a prominent example of a sexualized female character design from a male-centered perspective, noting her uniform's plunging neckline that emphasizes her breasts. Samara's attire was also criticized as inappropriate by Ryan Winterhalte from 1UP.com, who mockingly questioned whether the Code mandate that "Asari Matrons involved in dangerous situations must bare as much cleavage as possible".

Maggie Baird's body of work as an actress received increased media attention following her daughter Billie Eilish’s rise to prominence within the music industry by the late 2010s, with commentators describing Samara as her most recognizable video game role to date.

== See also ==
- Warrior monk
