= Mercy Point =

American television series (1998–1999)

- Title card
- Genre: Science fiction medical drama
- Created by: Trey Callaway; David Simkins; Milo Frank
- Starring: Joe Morton; Maria del Mar; Alexandra Wilson; Jordan Lund; Julia Pennington; Gay Thomas; Brian McNamara; Salli Richardson; Joe Spano
- Theme music composer: Jon Ehrlich
- Country of origin: United States
- Original language: English
- No. of seasons: 1
- No. of episodes: 7

Production
- Executive producers: Trey Callaway; Michael Katleman; Lee David Zlotoff; Joe Voci; Scott Sanders
- Production locations: Vancouver, British Columbia, Canada
- Running time: 42 minutes
- Production companies: Mandalay Television; Columbia TriStar Television

Original release
- Network: UPN
- Release: October 6, 1998 – July 15, 1999

Mercy Point is an American science fiction medical drama, created by Trey Callaway, David Simkins, and Milo Frank, which originally aired for one season on UPN from October 6, 1998, to July 15, 1999. With an ensemble cast led by Joe Morton, Maria del Mar, Alexandra Wilson, Brian McNamara, Salli Richardson, Julia Pennington, Gay Thomas, Jordan Lund, and Joe Spano, the series focuses on the doctors and nurses in a 23rd-century hospital space station located in deep space. The executive producers were Trey Callaway, Michael Katleman, Lee David Zlotoff, Joe Voci, and Scott Sanders.

Callaway adapted Mercy Point from his original screenplay, "Nightingale One". It was picked up by Mandalay Television, and the concept was eventually revised as a television project and renamed Mercy Point; production on the film project had ended due to the poor commercial performance of the 1997 film Starship Troopers. The television show was part of a three-million-dollar deal between Mandalay and Columbia TriStar Television to produce 200 hours of material. It was filmed in Vancouver to reduce production costs, the hospital sets being constructed on a series of sound stages. Director Joe Napolitano has praised the show for its use of a complete set to allow for more intricate directing. Despite Callaway envisioning Mercy Point as a companion to Star Trek: Voyager, it was paired with Moesha and Clueless as its lead-in on Tuesday nights. Initially focused on ethical and medical cases, the show's storylines gradually shifted toward relating the characters' personal relationships, to better fit UPN's primarily teen viewership.

Mercy Point was placed on hiatus after only three episodes were aired, and was replaced by the reality television series America's Greatest Pets and the sitcom Reunited. The show suffered from low ratings, with an average of two million viewers. The final four episodes of the series were broadcast in two 2-hour blocks on Thursday nights in July 1999. It has never been released on DVD or Blu-ray, but was made available to stream on Crackle. Critical response to Mercy Point was mixed; some commentators praised its characterization and use of science-fiction elements, while others found it to be uninteresting and unoriginal. Callaway stated that he had the potential story arcs for the full first season already planned before the show's cancellation.

== Premise ==
Set in the year 2249, Mercy Point revolves around doctors and nurses working in a hospital space station in deep space. The "state-of-the-art hospital" is described as "the last stop for anything going out, the first stop for anything coming back" by one of the show's characters. It is noted for existing on the "fringes of the galaxy", on a colony called Jericho. The facility includes advanced medical equipment, such as "artificial wombs, holographic three-dimensional X-ray projections [and] zero-gravity operating tables". A talking computer known as Hippocrates, voiced by series co-creator Trey Callaway, is shown as the primary method to monitor a patient's status.

The doctors and nurses work on both human and extraterrestrial patients over the course of the series. In the series, the medical staff is referred to as "med-nauts". Despite the futuristic setting, the characters' clothing and hairstyles adhere to 1990s fashion trends. In Frank Garcia and Mark Phillips' book Science Fiction Television Series, 1990–2004, they compared the concept behind the show to James White's Sector General series, Murray Leinster's stories about a doctor who travels to different planets, and G. Harry Stine's book Space Doctor. Mercy Point's setting and filming style also received comparisons to the television medical drama ER; the series itself was promoted as "ER in space".

== Characters ==
According to a press release from UPN, the series features the characters' attempts to "balanc[e] complicated personal lives with the demands of working in a cutting-edge hospital". Each episode includes story arcs involving personal and professional problems, the staff's relationships gaining more prominence as the series progressed. Alien physiologist Grote Maxwell (Joe Morton) works as the facility's lead doctor and surgeon. Senior surgeon Haylen Breslauer (Maria del Mar) directs Maxwell's actions as his boss and best friend. Dru Breslaur (Alexandra Wilson) begins working at the hospital in the pilot episode, creating tension because of her strained relationship with her older sister Haylen, and her past romance with Dr. C. J. Jurado (Brian McNamara). Jurado is characterized through his high libido, with his story arc involving a love triangle with Dru and his current girlfriend Lieutenant Kim Salisaw (Salli Richardson). While working as a doctor, Rema Cooke (Gay Thomas) grows more concerned about her patients' rights.

The android head nurse ANI (Julia Pennington) and the alien surgeon Dr. Batung (Jordan Lund) also help to combat the frequent medical emergencies at the hospital. ANI (Android Nursing Interface) is represented as "extremely efficient and attractive", the facility's other nurses disliking her as they feel that she sets an impossible standard for them to match. Throughout the series, ANI develops more emotions, such as crying and laughing, and tries to learn more about them. Batung, who is part of the slug-like species the Shenn, is portrayed as lacking bedside manners by acting insensitively toward his patients. His negative behavior is attributed to his lack of experience working with human co-workers and patients. The hospital is run by the Chief of Staff Harris DeMilla (Joe Spano), who is often tasked to handle its ethical issues.

== Production ==
=== Concept and development ===
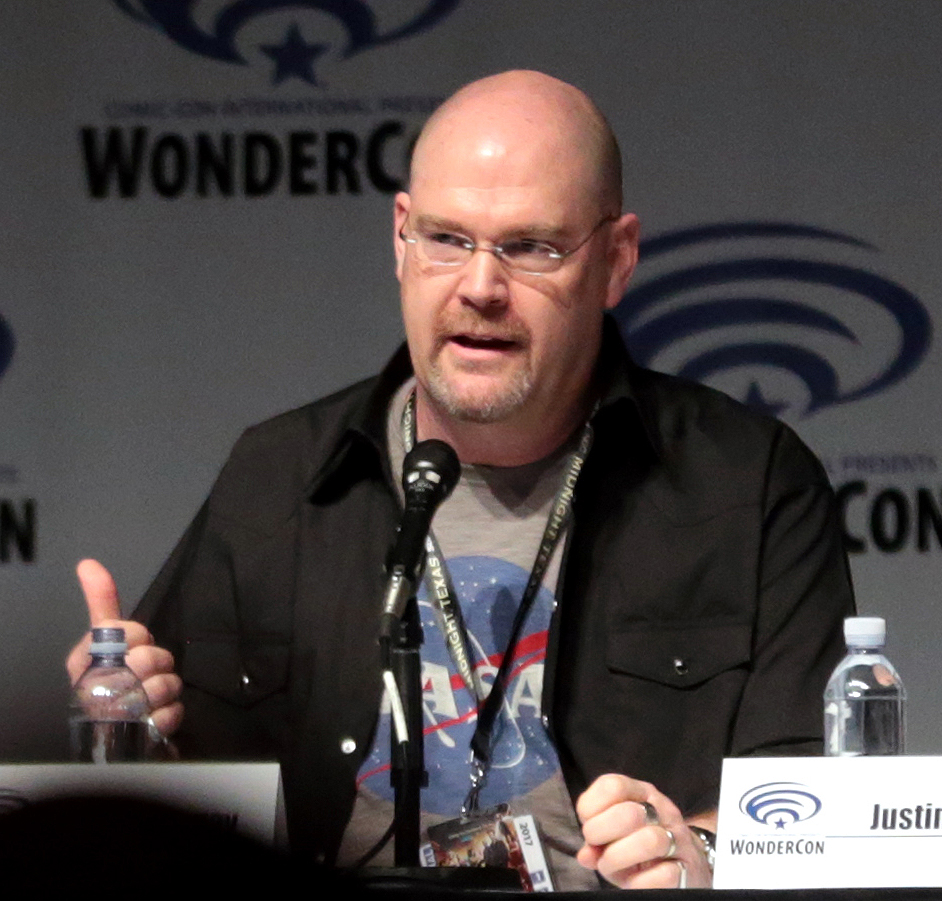
Trey Callaway (pictured in 2017) was one of the creators of Mercy Point.

Created by Trey Callaway, David Simkins, and Milo Frank, Mercy Point was originally developed as a concept for a feature film. Callaway drew his primary inspiration for the original screenplay from a concept by Frank, entitled "Nightingale One". And while pitching the idea to film executives, Callaway said in his closing comments that he could also envision it as the framework for a successful television series.

"Nightingale One" was eventually purchased by Mandalay Entertainment, a production company headed by Peter Guber, but the film's production was stalled after the poor commercial performance of the 1997 film Starship Troopers. Callaway said that following Starship Troopers, producers had "lost their appetite at that moment for any big-budgeted science fiction". However, a producer who saw Callaway's original pitch to Mandalay Entertainment's executives decided to reformat "Nightingale One" as a television series based on Callaway's final remarks in the meeting. After the concept's approval for television, "Nightingale One" was renamed Mercy Point.

During production, Callaway imagined the series as a "companion piece" to Star Trek: Voyager, with the hope that it would have a shared viewership. Even though elements of "Nightingale One" were kept, Callaway said that "[he] really started over again and reconceived it completely as a series from the ground up". Prior to the series being officially green-lit, Callaway collaborated with writer David Simkins to prepare a presentation of a "low-budgeted 30 minute" pilot. Simkins did not work on the series after his pilot, but his contributions earned him a credit as one of its co-creators. John de Lancie, who was noted for acting as Q in Star Trek: The Next Generation, had essayed the role of DeMilla, and Steve Johnson designed the non-humanoid aliens. The pilot presentation was filmed in Los Angeles, but the sets were completely renovated for the series' episodes. Three non-humanoid characters, including ANI and Batung, were added to the show following this presentation.

UPN executives responded positively to the presentation, and ordered thirteen episodes of the series, which was considered a "half-season's worth". Mercy Point was one of four shows produced by Mandalay Television that appeared in the 1998–99 United States television schedule, alongside Cupid, Rude Awakening, and Oh Baby. The show's production was part of a three-million-dollar deal with Columbia TriStar Television to produce 200 hours of material; a majority of the content created from this agreement was commercially unsuccessful.

=== Casting and filming ===
Callaway carefully chose actors when casting each role. He focused on maintaining the series as a "character-driven plot", to always make "what is going on with people's hearts and minds" more important than special effects. Despite auditioning other actors to voice Hippocrates, Callway reprised the role from the pilot; he would later say that he had difficulty with the medical and technical vocabulary required for the character. Like The X-Files and Stargate SG-1, the show was filmed in Vancouver to take advantage of lower production costs. A majority of the crew had worked on The X-Files. The executive producers were: Trey Callaway, Michael Katleman, Lee David Zlotoff, Joe Voci, and Scott Sanders. Jon Ehrlich composed the show's theme.

The entire series was shot on sound stages. Production designers Greg Loewen and Graemay Murray designed the medical facility as a "circular hub with offices and rooms radiating outward", and included a second floor in which DeMilla could oversee the entire hospital's operations. Director Joe Napolitano praised the sets while filming the episode "Last Resort", calling the show "a good candy store for a director" due to the functionality and size of the hospital. He explained that the set enabled him to direct long takes and walk and talk sequences without much difficulty.

The series required extensive prosthetic work for Dr. Batung and the non-human patients. The application of Lund's prosthetic makeup required several hours each day that he was filmed. Napolitano said that he found this to be a challenge to the production schedule, explaining that there would be discussions about the amount of prosthetics necessary for Batung depending on the scene. Batung's prosthetic work included a tail that wrapped around his neck and shoulders; Lund was pushed around the set on a sled to mimic the character's movements as a slug. Napolitano also specified that the patients required a similar amount of time and work for their prosthetic makeup, such as a man who has gills under his chin.

=== Cancellation and unproduced episodes ===
Callaway said he was surprised by UPN's cancellation of Mercy Point because of their strong support of the show. He felt the decision was made in part because of the show's high production costs. He also concluded that the decision to broadcast the pilot at the same time as the World Series resulted in the loss of Mercy Point's target audience. To better connect with UPN's teen viewers, Callaway shifted the show's focus from medical and ethical cases to the characters' relationships. Despite these revisions, he said that UPN executives preferred to air shows like Moesha over science-fiction programs. When UPN announced the show's cancellation, the eighth episode was in the middle of production. Scenes originally written for the episode were revised and edited into the seventh episode to form a complete series finale.

In an interview about the series, Callaway said that he had developed complete story arcs for each character for the rest of the first season. Hayden would have continued to deal with feelings of "homesickness", which is defined as "a crippling interstellar condition unique to humans that ultimately linked their survival to returning to Earth" in the context of the show. Batung would have suffered consequences for rejecting "the protective fold of his species", and ANI would develop an antidote for a virus that spread from computers to humans in the pilot episode. Callaway described ANI's future character development as "the ultimate clash between the organic and technological worlds". The status of Grote's missing family would eventually be uncovered after he conducts a rescue mission with C. J. to the "Sahartic Divide". Dru would be confronted by her "old addictions" and Cooke would test her theory that the temporal lobe houses a human's soul and is connected with "homesickness".

== Episodes ==
No.	Title	Directed by	Written by	Original release date	US viewers (millions)
1	"New Arrivals"	Michael Katleman	Trey Callaway	October 6, 1998	1.7
The medical staff tries to find the cure for a computer virus that has begun to affect humans. An operation involving a mother and her unborn child is conducted in zero gravity. Dru Breslaur joins the hospital as a new resident and is forced to confront her past with her older sister Haylen Breslauer, and develops a romance with C. J. Jurado. She also decides to help alien physiologist Grote Maxwell in his search for his missing family. ANI is promoted to the position of head nurse.
2	"Opposing Views"	D. J. Caruso	Trey Callaway	October 13, 1998	1.3
A shuttle accident results in an influx of patients sent to Mercy Point. The doctors download the dying co-pilot's memory to investigate the cause of the accident. Dru treats her first patient, and Jurado and Grote treat a patient in cryostasis. Dr. Batung performs a surgery to attach two artificial limbs to a famous gymnast, while also trying to be more empathetic with his patients. ANI begins to feel more emotion, and sheds a tear after her work is praised.
3	"Last Resort"	Joe Napolitano	Brent V. Friedman	October 20, 1998	1.4
Maxwell is forced to perform an experimental surgery on an influential man's dying son that requires an ill alien to be sacrificed for his blood. During the surgery, the son saves the alien instead through a reverse blood transfusion. A woman checks herself into Mercy Point after developing webbed feet. Haylen diagnoses an ex-boyfriend with homesickness, while Dru oversleeps during one of the first days of her residency.
4	"Second Chances"	Randall Zisk	Gary Glasberg	July 8, 1999	0.9
A patient is prematurely aging following an illegal operation that transplanted the mind of an old scientist into a younger man's body. Maxwell is conflicted on how to proceed as one of the minds must be sacrificed to save the other. Haylen and Dru argue over the best treatment for a patient whose arteries are clogged by synthetic blood, and ANI continues to research human emotions.
5	"No Mercy"	Michael Katleman	Deborah Starr Seibel	July 8, 1999	1.0
Maxwell is placed under high scrutiny when a high proportion of alien deaths occur at Mercy Point, leading to the arrival of a team of researchers at the hospital. A patient requires an eye transplant, but Haylen becomes concerned on discovering the woman has already received several transplants from Jurado in the past.
6	"Battle Scars"	Lee Bonner	Jonathan Robert Kaplan	July 15, 1999	0.8
Jurado is in critical condition after being jettisoned out of an airlock. A miner makes a profitable discovery, but contracts an illness that prevents him from enjoying it. Dru helps a teenage drug addict detox even though she could not find the teenager's mother to get her consent.
7	"Persistence of Vision"	Alex Graves	Brent V. Friedman	July 15, 1999	0.9
The medical crew locate a capsule containing a man who chose to live in exile in space rather than go to prison. He claims that his brain disease is the result of communicating with God. Rema Cooke tries to help a woman deal with her nightmares, which threaten to drive her insane.

== Broadcast history and release ==
Following the decision to expand its programming to Thursday and Friday nights, UPN picked up six original series. Mercy Point was one of two science fiction television shows picked up by UPN – the second being the time travel-themed Seven Days. Scott D. Pierce of Deseret News described the network's choice of two science-fiction dramas and two 19th-century programs (The Secret Diary of Desmond Pfeiffer and Legacy) as showing "a definite bent toward the unusual". Prior to its premiere, the show was promoted through its inclusion of Joe Morton in a starring role. Although Callaway envisioned Mercy Point as a companion to Star Trek: Voyager, UPN paired the Star Trek installment with Seven Days instead. Mercy Point was initially broadcast on Tuesday nights at 9 pm EST, following the sitcoms Moesha and Clueless. The Moesha and Clueless block was held over from the previous year. Entertainment Weekly's Dan Snierson noted that Mercy Point faced tough competition from other shows in the same time slot, primarily Just Shoot Me!, Spin City, and Felicity. The series carried a TV-PG parental rating, meaning that it was judged as "unsuitable for young children".

UPN placed Mercy Point on hiatus on October 27, 1998, after the show averaged a rating of 1.5 million viewers. The announcement was made ten days after the series premiere; only three episodes had aired before the hiatus. It was replaced by the reality television series America's Greatest Pets and the sitcom Reunited. The show ranked number 157 based on the Nielsen Media Research's survey of programs airing from September 21, 1998, to May 26, 1999, with an average of two million viewers. It tied with America's Greatest Pets and The Love Boat: The Next Wave. Joal Ryan of E! News wrote that the network's decision was not a surprise given that most viewers were unaware of the show's existence. While reporting on the show's status, Ryan questioned the repeated failures of science-fiction medical dramas. In October 1998, media outlets were reporting that the series might still return to UPN's primetime schedule sometime in the future. The series' final four episodes were broadcast in two 2-hour blocks on Thursday nights in July 1999. Mercy Point was included on the list of failed medical shows by The Blade's Rob Owen, along with MDs and 3 lbs. It has never been released on DVD or Blu-ray, but is available to stream on Crackle.

== Critical response ==
Mercy Point has received mixed critical feedback. Prior to the show's premiere, a writer from SouthCoastToday.com wrote that it would appeal to Star Trek fans through its use of "portentous dialogue and plenty of gross-out imagery". David Bianculli of The New York Daily News praised Mercy Point as an improvement over "UPN's watch-me-please gimmick shows", and commended the way the show focused on its characters and medical cases while it "relegat[ed] the futuristic elements to the background". The Milwaukee Journal Sentinel's Joanne Weintraub favorably compared the show to Buffy the Vampire Slayer, writing that "both series take their special effects seriously and their often tongue-in-cheek dialogue lightly". Variety's Laura Fries wrote that the series had potential if it adhered to its own rules and focused on real drama. Fries highlighted Michael Katleman's directing as "crisp" and praised the show's technical credits.

Mercy Point also garnered negative reactions from television critics, with GamesRadar's Dave Golder including it on his list of the worst science fiction and fantasy television shows of all time for its "[t]rite, obvious and cheesy" storylines. The Los Angeles Times' Howard Rosenberg criticized the show's reliance on its science-fiction context and technology to distract the viewers from "its mustiness and lack of originality". Even though Rosenberg felt the show's concept had potential and found Batung to be an intriguing character, he advised the audience to "change this bedpan fast". Lee Sandlin of The Chicago Reader included Mercy Point in his assessment of the worst television shows in the 1998–1999 season, criticizing its lack of originality and poor writing. The series was heavily panned by Kevin Wagner of the science-fiction online magazine The Sci-Fi Guys, who found the pilot's story arc to be uninteresting and the use of rubber gloves as a way for advanced containment to be unrealistic. The Sun-Sentinel's Hal Boedeker cited Mercy Point and The Secret Diary of Desmond Pfeiffer as "misbegotten fare" that alienated its audience and lowered viewership by forty percent.

Several media commentators made negative comparisons between Mercy Point and other television programs. The show was described as reminiscent of a Saturday Night Live skit "that sounded brighter on paper than it plays on the air" by The Sun-Sentinel's Tom Jicha, who felt it served as a spoof of ER. Caryn James of The New York Times wrote that Mercy Point was the "oddball new series", saying it was not compelling either in a dramatic or campy manner. Editor Jason Snell criticized the show as a retread of Crisis Center and General Hospital, describing it as an "utter waste of an intriguing premise", and The Chicago Tribune's Steve Johnson called it the "ER-in-space mess". Both Snell and Johnson encouraged UPN to cancel the series following the announcement of its hiatus.
