= University Hospital (TV series) =

- Created by: James L. Conway; Joel J. Feigenbaum
- Starring: Rebecca Cross; Hillary Danner; Hudson Leick; Alexandra Wilson; Tonya Pinkins
- Composer: Ken Harrison
- Country of origin: United States
- Original language: English
- No. of seasons: 1
- No. of episodes: 9

Production
- Executive producers: James L. Conway; Aaron Spelling; E. Duke Vincent
- Running time: 60 minutes
- Production companies: Spelling Entertainment; Worldvision Enterprises

Original release
- Network: Syndication
- Release: January 16 – May 1, 1995

University Hospital is an American medical drama series that aired from January 16 to May 1, 1995. It was part of a syndicated package of shows called the Spelling Premiere Network.

== Premise ==
The series is about four student nurses at a university aka k1 hospital.

== Cast ==
=== Main ===
- Rebecca Cross as Megan Peterson
- Hillary Danner as Jamie Fuller
- Hudson Leick as Tracy Stone
- Alexandra Wilson as Samantha "Sam" McCormick
- Tonya Pinkins as Nurse Jenkins

=== Recurring ===
- Doug Wert as Dr. Rob Daniels
- Michael Palance as Mark

== Episodes ==
No.	Title	Directed by	Written by	Original release date
1	"Secrets Great and Small"	James L. Conway	James L. Conway & Joel J. Feigenbaum	January 16, 1995
A handsome doctor attempts to rape Samantha. Megan buys a used car.
2	"Endings and Beginnings"	Harry Harris	Bruce Franklin Singer	January 23, 1995
Drugs have been stolen from the hospital. Megan tries to help a patient with a dying wish.
3	"Life and Death"	Jonathan Frakes	Joel J. Feigenbaum	January 30, 1995
A friend of Jamie has a hidden past as a convicted murderer. A famous artist asks Megan to pose nude.
4	"The Right Thing"	Harry Harris	Thomas C. Chapman	February 6, 1995
Megan is a witness to an armed robbery. Tracy's biological mother isn't happy that she found her. Jamie goes out on a date with a plastic surgeon.
5	"You Can Run..."	Rachel Feldman	William Conway	February 13, 1995
Jamie's ex-boyfriend wants her to get back together with him. Megan tries to keep a child at the hospital despite her parents' wishes. Tracy goes out on a blind date with a mortician. Megan's plans with Dr. Daniels keep falling through.
6	"Crisis in Unit 2E"	Burt Brinckerhoff	Bruce Franklin Singer	February 20, 1995
An entire floor of the hospital gets quarantined when a deadly virus is detected.
7	"Dark Side of the Moon"	Harry Harris	Thomas C. Chapman	February 27, 1995
Megan helps a girl in a sanatorium prove that her father is a murderer. Tracy marries a composer so he can keep his citizenship. Tracy and Jamie help a fighting couple.
8	"Til Death Do Us Part"	James L. Conway	Beverly Bridges	April 24, 1995
The husband of nurse Jenkins is critically injured in a motor vehicle crash, she must decide if she wants to help the person responsible.
9	"Shadow of a Doubt"	Joel J. Feigenbaum	James L. Conway	May 1, 1995
Tracy's career is in risk when a doctor denies responsibility for a patient getting the wrong medications.
