= Billie Eilish – Hit Me Hard and Soft: The Tour (Live in 3D) =

2026 concert film

- Theatrical release poster
- Directed by: James Cameron; Billie Eilish
- Produced by: James Cameron; Billie Eilish
- Starring: Billie Eilish; James Cameron; Finneas O'Connell
- Cinematography: John Brooks
- Edited by: James Cameron; Ben Wainwright-Pearce
- Music by: Billie Eilish
- Production companies: Lightstorm Earth; Darkroom Films; Interscope Films
- Distributed by: Paramount Pictures
- Release dates: May 6, 2026 (Fox Westwood); May 8, 2026 (United States)
- Running time: 114 minutes
- Country: United States
- Language: English
- Budget: $20 million
- Box office: $26.7 million

Billie Eilish – Hit Me Hard and Soft: The Tour (Live in 3D) is a 2026 American 3D concert film directed and produced by James Cameron and singer-songwriter Billie Eilish. The film stars Eilish and features performances from her seventh headlining concert tour, Hit Me Hard and Soft: The Tour (2025), in Manchester. It is Eilish's third concert film succeeding Happier Than Ever: A Love Letter to Los Angeles (2021) and Billie Eilish: Live at the O2 (2022).

The concert film premiered at the Fox Westwood Village Theater on May 6, 2026, and was theatrically released by Paramount Pictures on May 8, 2026. It received positive reviews from critics.

== Background and production ==
American singer-songwriter Billie Eilish released her third studio album, Hit Me Hard and Soft, on May 17, 2024. Drawing from her experiences with relationships, identity, body image, and the pressures of fame, the album was developed as a cohesive full-length project and released without any advance singles. It was widely acclaimed by music critics for its intimate lyricism, atmospheric production, and dynamic shifts between delicate balladry, alternative pop, electronic music, and orchestral arrangements. In support of the album, Eilish embarked on her seventh headlining concert tour, Hit Me Hard and Soft: The Tour, from September 2024 to November 2025.

In July 2025, during one of Eilish's shows at Co-op Live in Manchester, she announced that the concert was being filmed for a secret 3D project with director James Cameron. In November 2025, the project was revealed to be a concert film documenting the tour, with Eilish and Cameron as co-directors. Billie Eilish – Hit Me Hard and Soft: The Tour (Live in 3D) is Eilish's third concert film after Happier Than Ever: A Love Letter to Los Angeles (2021), directed by Robert Rodriguez and Patrick Osborne, and Billie Eilish: Live at the O2 (2022), directed by Sam Wrench. Produced by Darkroom Records, Interscope Films, and Lightstorm Earth, the film utilized virtual reality 3D technology, via a partnership with Meta Platforms and Cameron's Lightstorm Vision, for a release on Meta Quest headsets.

During an interview, Cameron revealed that he was the one who came up with the idea of shooting Eilish's tour in 3D: "I was talking to Billie's mom, Maggie, who's really into a lot of the same food choice and sustainability issues that my wife Suzy and I are," he explained. "That's why we're vegan and Maggie's vegan. She does food programs around Billie's tour, and she's coming in as an executive producer on our sequel to The Game Changers, which is about plant-based athletes." While speaking with her, Cameron said, "Maggie, why aren't we shooting Billie's tour in 3D? It'd be amazing!" This led to the tour eventually being filmed in 3D.

== Release ==
Early access screenings for Billie Eilish – Hit Me Hard and Soft: The Tour (Live in 3D) were held on April 29, 2026. The film premiered at the Fox Westwood Village Theater on May 6, and was theatrically released by Paramount Pictures on May 8. It was previously scheduled to be released on March 20 of that year. It was released on streaming via Paramount+ on August 6.

== Reception ==
=== Box office ===
As of August 1, 2026, Billie Eilish – Hit Me Hard and Soft: The Tour (Live in 3D) has grossed $9.9 million in the United States and Canada, and $16.8 million in other territories, for a worldwide total of $26.7 million.

In the United States and Canada, Billie Eilish – Hit Me Hard and Soft: The Tour (Live in 3D) was released alongside The Sheep Detectives and Mortal Kombat II, and was projected to gross $6–9 million during the Mother's Day weekend. It opened with $4.2 million on its first day, with $2.2 million in Thursday night previews, averaging $1,722 per theater in 2,613 theaters. It went on to gross $7.5 million during the weekend, ranking fifth.

=== Critical response ===
On the review aggregator website Rotten Tomatoes, 92% of 83 critics' reviews are positive, with an average rating of 7.6/10. The website's consensus reads: "Directed with kinetic flair by James Cameron, Hit Me Hard and Soft doesn't unpack Billie Eilish's artistry so much as let her fans revel in it from multiple dimensions." Metacritic, which uses a weighted average, assigned the film a score of 73 out of 100, based on 23 critics, indicating "generally favorable" reviews. Audiences surveyed by CinemaScore gave the film an average grade of "A" on an A+ to F scale.

According to Forbes's summary, the film offers an innovative experience, blending live performance with behind-the-scenes footage featuring Eilish and Finneas as critics praise its vivid, intimate footage, immersive quality, and unique approach to the concert film genre, highlighting Eilish's strong connection with her fans. However, some critics argue that it prioritizes style over substance, lacks thematic depth, and fails to fully capture the show's scope, suggesting it is a "splashy style experiment" rather than a deep dive into her artistry.

Angie Han of The Hollywood Reporter wrote, "With its vivid footage, sometimes captured from breathlessly intimate proximity, you might be able to believe, just for a moment, that you could really reach right through the screen and touch her." Owen Gleiberman of Variety wrote, "Hit Me Hard and Soft is a concert film that doesn't look and feel like other concert films. It's a true experience, because of a combination of the show itself and the way that Cameron has filmed it." Liz Shannon Miller of Consequence praised both Eilish and Cameron as directors, writing that "Anyone who's ever been to a great concert knows that it's the very rare movie that can fully capture the transcendence of live performance. Hit Me Hard and Soft gets damn close thanks to the dual perspectives of its directors."

Adam Graham of The Detroit News called Eilish "one of the defining pop artists of our time" and said, "As impressive as the movie is, it never overwhelms Eilish, or becomes bigger than her. It's a massive pop spectacle at a human scale." Peter Howell of the Toronto Star called the film a "magical and emotional spectacle" while praising the insane connection Eilish has with her fans, which is given far more exposure than in other recent concert films. Tara Brady of The Irish Times praised Cameron's thematic depth direction and said, "He knows his way around depth of field, and even his most softball questions and remarks enliven the capture of a spectacular performance in Manchester."

Brandon Yu of The New York Times praised its 3D viewing experience as Cameron played with shiny camera technology, and said that the result, if not reinvented, is a "totally reinvigorated affair". Helen O'Hara of Empire said that the film was made for everyone, claiming that one does not have to be a diehard Eilish fan to appreciate the artistry in music, performance and filmmaking. M.N. Miller of FandomWire claimed the film "redefines the genre" and that it "attempts to blur the lines between performer and audience."

=== Accolades ===
Awards and nominations for Hit Me Hard and Soft: The Tour (Live in 3D)
Award	Date of ceremony	Category	Recipient(s)	Result	Ref.
Grammy Awards	February 7, 2027	Best Music Film	James Cameron & Billie Eilish (video directors); Michelle An, Maggie Baird, Steve Berman, John Brooks, Geoff Burdick, James Cameron, Paul Clarke, Chelsea Dodson, Billie Eilish, John Janick, Justin Lubliner, Jason Owen & Maria Wilhelm (video producers).	Pending	
