= Alexandra Wilson =

American actress

- Born: Alexandra Muriel Wilson
- Occupation: Actress
- Years active: 1984–present

Alexandra Muriel Wilson is an American actress. She is best known for playing the original Josie Watts on the soap opera Another World (1988–1991). She also starred in the television series Homefront (1991-1992) and the film Small Soldiers (1998).

== Biography ==
=== Early life ===
Alexandra Wilson attended Chantilly High School in Fairfax County, Virginia, and was involved in performing and cheerleading. Wilson then studied theater and history at Broward Community College in the Miami area, but left after a year to avoid the drug scene.

Wilson's grandmother was one of the first Rockettes. Her mother (Elaine Wilson), an award-winning drama teacher at Chantilly High School, sparked her interest in acting, as early as age five. Wilson recounted her mother's influence: "She put me in some of her productions, and she taught me in high school. I was never sure I could do it, but I knew I had to be an actor."

After graduating from high school, Wilson held drama seminars for her mother's students. Later, Elaine Wilson would co-found and serve as President of The Alliance Theatre in Centreville, Virginia.

=== Career ===
In 1980, with her parents' encouragement, Wilson moved to New York City to fully pursue a performing career. She initially lived with her ex-Rockette grandmother and paid for acting, dancing, and singing classes by waitressing for customers like Paul Newman, Mick Jagger, and Matthew Broderick. While auditioning for musicals, Wilson discovered that she preferred television and films over theater, as she admittedly struggled with dancing, though she could sing and act.

Wilson's early television roles were minor parts in the primetime series The New Mike Hammer (1984) and Spenser: For Hire (1986). By 1988, her film credits included Diner, Silent Madness, The Secret of My Success, and The Distance Between. From the age of 19, she has supplemented her income by appearing in a number of commercials, most notably for Pizza Hut, Tide, Coke, and later, Claritin.

Wilson's breakthrough came when she was cast as a regular in television daytime dramas. She made her soap opera debut as Sage Holland, a recurring character in As the World Turns. Wilson then progressed to starring in Loving (1987) as the troubled teenager April Hathaway. Six months into her contract, however, she was written out of the show, which led her to audition for Another World. When Wilson won the part of city-turned-farm girl Josie Watts, she welcomed the change, stating, "There's more potential with Josie than there was with April. She has more 'life' to her." Starting June 1988, Wilson starred in Another World for three years. In 1994, she would turn down an offer to portray Kelly Cramer on One Life to Live.

In 1991, Wilson moved to Los Angeles and transitioned to primetime television as a principal cast member of the post-World War II drama Homefront. Her appearance as Sarah Brewer Metcalf in Season One, opposite Kyle Chandler, allowed her to play a grown-up character for the first time. It also showcased her longtime fascination with history, particularly the World War II dynamics of both the battlefront and civilian life, and the importance of women in factories. Despite winning the 1992 People's Choice Award for Favorite New TV Dramatic Series, Homefront had an abbreviated run and was not renewed for a third season. Subsequently, Wilson would receive main billing in other short-lived drama series: the Aaron Spelling-produced The Round Table (1992) and University Hospital (1995), and the medical science fiction program Mercy Point (1998-1999).

After Homefront, in the early 1990s, Wilson briefly returned to high school roles as the love interest of Billy Cranston (David Yost) in Mighty Morphin Power Rangers and the girlfriend of Brandon Walsh (Jason Priestley) in Beverly Hills, 90210. The latter reunited her with former Loving/Another World co-star Luke Perry. Throughout the 1990s, Wilson had several episodic guest spots on television, including One West Waikiki, Mr. & Mrs. Smith, High Tide (starring Rick Springfield), The Tony Danza Show, and V.I.P. (with Pamela Anderson Lee and Jay Leno).

In 1998, Wilson had a role in the movie Small Soldiers, directed by Joe Dante. From 1996 to 1999, Wilson was additionally involved in a string of made-for-television movies: If Looks Could Kill (alongside Antonio Sabato Jr.), The Second Civil War (with Beau Bridges and James Earl Jones, and also directed by Dante), The Christmas Wish (opposite Neil Patrick Harris and Debbie Reynolds), and In My Sister's Shadow (co-starring Janet Leigh).

Wilson's performances in the early 2000s included guest appearances in the television shows Any Day Now, First Monday, and Larry David's Curb Your Enthusiasm. She has since starred in independent features, namely the 2002 neo-noir Ocean Park (in the dual role of twins Jo and Davia), Bradford Tatum's crime thriller Salt (2006), and the Kickstarter-funded Life Inside Out in 2013.

=== Personal life ===
A dog owner, she once adopted a Spuds MacKenzie look-alike from the ASPCA. She is a history buff, and World War II is her favorite subject.

Another World co-star Allison Hossack was Wilson's roommate in the early 1990s in New York City. She later shared a two-bedroom Hollywood Hills apartment with Sharon Lawrence. Wilson is also good friends with Homefront co-star Jessica Steen and has stayed in touch with Another World's Matt Crane after leaving the show.

== Filmography ==
=== Film ===
Year	Movie	Role	Notes
1998	Small Soldiers	Ms. Kegel	
2006	Salt	Phoebe	
2009	Ocean Park	Jolette Delacroix / Davia Delacroix	
2013	Life Inside Out	Vicky	

=== Television ===
Year	Title	Role	Notes
1984	Mickey Spillane's Mike Hammer	Sally	"Too Young to Die"
1986	Spenser: For Hire	Chrissy Pierce	"At the River's Edge"
1987	As the World Turns	Sage Holland	Recurring role
1987–1989	Loving	April Hathaway	TV series
1988–1991	Another World	Josephine Anne 'Josie' Watts	Main role
1991–92	Homefront	Sarah Brewer	Main role (season 1); Won – 18th People's Choice Awards for Favorite New Dramatic Series
1992	Beverly Hills, 90210	Brooke Alexander	"Sex, Lies and Volleyball/Photo Fini", "Shooting Star/American in Paris", "Castles in the Sand"
1992	The Round Table	Kaitlin Cavanaugh	6 episodes (2 unaired)
1993	Mighty Morphin Power Rangers	Marge	"Peace, Love and Woe"
1995	University Hospital	Sam McCormick	Main role
1995	One West Waikiki		"Unhappily Ever After"
1996	If Looks Could Kill		TV film
1996	Mr. & Mrs. Smith	Elena Rossini	"The Grape Escape"
1997	High Tide	Liddy Parker	"Two Barretts and a Baby"
1997	The Second Civil War	Caroline Dawes	TV film
1998	The Tony Danza Show	Allison Paxton	"Vision Quest"
1998	The Christmas Wish	Julia	TV film
1998–99	Mercy Point	Dr. Dru Breslauer	Main role
1999	In My Sister's Shadow	Laurie Connor	TV film
1999	V.I.P.	Sharon Carter	"Valma and Louise"
2001	Any Day Now		"It's Not Just a Word: Part 1"
2002	First Monday	Mary Willis	"Strip Search"
2002	Curb Your Enthusiasm	Mary	"Mary, Joseph and Larry"
