= Jordan Lund =

American actor

Jordan Lund is an American stage, film and television actor.

== Career ==
He received his training at Carnegie-Mellon University and began working on Broadway as a member of the Estelle Parsons directed Shakespeare repertory company in residence at the Belasco Theatre.

Between 1984 and 2011, he appeared five productions at the Delacorte Theater in Central Park, for Shakespeare in the Park.

On television, he appeared most often as a guest star in single episodes of various series, though he did appear in the supporting role of Dr. Batung, an alien, on the single season of the science fiction series Mercy Point (1998–99). Film roles include The Bucket List, Doc Hollywood, Speed, American President and The Rookie.

== Selected filmography ==
- 1974 Lenny as Nightclub Customer (uncredited)
- 1989 Lonesome Dove (Miniseries) as Hutto
- 1989 Jacknife as 'Tiny'
- 1989 Fletch Lives as Deputy Sheriff
- 1989 She's Back as 'Meathook'
- 1989 Lock Up as Guard Manly
- 1990 Framed (TV movie) as Guard At Shane Estate
- 1990 The Adventures of Ford Fairlane as Amiable Tourist
- 1990 The Rookie as The Bartender
- 1991 Doc Hollywood (1991) as John Crawford / Butcher
- 1991 Harley Davidson and the Marlboro Man as Guard
- 1991 Star Trek: The Next Generation (TV series) as Kluge
- 1990-1992 Life Goes On (TV series) as Henry Muckerman
- 1992 Cruel Doubt (Miniseries) as Officer Edwards
- 1992 Love Is Like That as Mr. Cook
- 1993 Amos & Andrew as Riley
- 1993 Star Trek: Deep Space Nine (TV series) as Woban
- 1994 The Stand (Miniseries) as Bill Hapscomb
- 1994 L.A. Law (TV series) as Detective Mark Matosian
- 1994 Speed as Bagwell
- 1994 Alien Nation: Dark Horizon (TV movie) as 'Moe' Goodluck
- 1995 Species as Aide
- 1995 The American President as Carl
- 1995 Goldilocks and the Three Bears as Mayor
- 1995-1997 Law & Order (TV series) as Laramy / Lester Bishop
- 1996 Before and After as Bailiff (uncredited)
- 1996 Ghosts of Mississippi as Deputy
- 1997 Chicago Hope (TV series) as Leonard Mankiewicz
- 1997 In Dark Places as Bald Man
- 1998 Prey (TV series) as Willis / Martin
- 1998-1999 Seven Days (TV series) as Press Secretary
- 1998–1999 Mercy Point as Dr. Batung (supporting cast)
- 1999 The Practice (TV Series) as Officer
- 1999 Life as Funeral Chaplain
- 1999 Crazy in Alabama as Bridge Patrolman #1 (uncredited)
- 1999 The Story of Us as Clergyman
- 2000 The Visit as Photographer
- 2000 More Dogs Than Bones as Detective Lund
- 2000 Beautiful as Detective
- 2001 ER (TV series) as Carl Finkley (uncredited)
- 2002 NYPD Blue (TV series) as Captain Robert Lane
- 2003 Frasier (TV series) as Team Leader Ronnie
- 2003 Star Trek: Enterprise (TV series), episode "Bounty" as Skalaar
- 2003 Alex & Emma as Claude
- 2005 Rumor Has It... as Charity Dinner Guests
- 2007 Without a Trace (TV series) as Russell Beeman
- 2007 The Bucket List as Tattoo Artist
- 2010 Law & Order: Criminal Intent (TV series) as Marvin
- 2011 Good Luck Charlie (TV series) as Jeremiah
- 2011 Life at the Resort as Pierre
- 2012 Awake (TV series) as Dr. Arthur Taylor
