= In My Sister's Shadow =

- Genre: Drama
- Written by: Dan Vining; Ronni Kern
- Story by: Rob Fresco
- Directed by: Sandor Stern
- Starring: Nancy McKeon; Janet Leigh; Thomas Joseph McCarthy; Alexandra Wilson
- Theme music composer: Dennis McCarthy
- Country of origin: United States
- Original language: English

Production
- Executive producer: Robert Dalrymple
- Producers: Sandra Saxon Brice; Kim Rubin
- Cinematography: Ron Orieux
- Editor: Jere Huggins
- Running time: 100 minutes
- Production companies: Steinhardt Baer Pictures Company; CBS Productions

Original release
- Network: CBS
- Release: January 5, 1999

In My Sister's Shadow is a 1999 American made-for-television drama film directed by Sandor Stern and starring Nancy McKeon, Janet Leigh, Thomas Joseph McCarthy and Alexandra Wilson. The film originally aired on CBS on January 5, 1999.

== Plot ==
Joan Connor is a lonely florist who has always played second fiddle to her pretty younger sister Laurie due in part to the well-meaning but misguided signals sent out by their mother Kay. When Laurie finally leaves her longtime ex-boyfriend Michael Butler after a roller-coaster relationship, Joan is there again to pick up the pieces. But Laurie doesn't need to be picked up for very long: she meets Mark, a handsome man who owns a fish store.

Michael, on the other hand, can't get over the breakup and begins stalking Laurie and her new beau Mark, all the while trying to seduce and insinuate plain Joan into his life — and turn her against her sister. Laurie and Mark decide to get married, which pushes a psychotic Michael over the edge and forces Joan to make some kind of decision.

== Cast ==
- Nancy McKeon as Joan Connor
- Janet Leigh as Kay Connor
- Thomas Joseph McCarthy as Michael Butler
- Alexandra Wilson as Laurie Connor
- Mark Dobies as Mark
- Scott Wilkinson as Detective Charlie Hunt

== Filming ==
In My Sister's Shadow was shot in Salt Lake City from March 11 to April 4, 1997. Although the film was completed in 1997, CBS did not premiere it until 1999.
