= Asari (Mass Effect) =

Fictional species in the Mass Effect series

- Mass Effect race
- Concept art of individual asari characters from The Art of the Mass Effect Universe
- First appearance: Mass Effect: Revelation (2007)
- Created by: BioWare

In-universe information
- Home world: Thessia
- Official religion: Siari
- Affiliation: Citadel Council

The Asari are a fictional extraterrestrial humanoid species in the Mass Effect multimedia franchise developed by BioWare and published by Electronic Arts. Introduced in the 2007 novel Mass Effect: Revelation, the asari are a sapient homeotherm species who are naturally inclined towards biotics, the ability to manipulate dark energy and alter the mass of objects through the use of electrical impulses from the brain, which produce various psychic abilities such as telekinesis.

The asari are depicted as beings with a feminine appearance by non-asari standards, a pansexual-panromantic orientation, and the capability of reproducing with any species. Asari can live for over a thousand years and go through three stages of life, which is analogous to the Triple Goddess archetype in Neopagan religious and spiritual traditions. Asari culture is depicted as being egalitarian, xenophilic, pro-diversification, pro-multiculturalism and anti-eugenics. The asari appear in most Mass Effect games and media: several are major characters, such as Liara T'Soni, Matriarch Benezia, Samara, Aria T'Loak, Lexi T'Perro and Pelessaria "Peebee" B'Sayle. In addition, the asari are playable characters in the multiplayer modes for Mass Effect 3 and Mass Effect: Andromeda.

The asari have been recognized as an important aspect of the universe of Mass Effect and are popular among fans as subjects for expressions of fan labor, though they have received a wide range of positive and negative critical responses from their various appearances.

== Concept and design ==
As the initial step in the design process for alien races, the writing team would first supply a short paragraph describing the species. According to associate art director Matt Rhodes, the writers wanted a race of "beautiful, blue aliens" designed to add a familiar science fiction element to the series. Their blue skin references the Orion species from Star Trek. The Bioware team was also influenced by the 1992 space game Star Control II, with writer Patrick Weekes acknowledging the influence of the Syreen on the conception of the asari, with their feminine presentation, innate psychic abilities, and cultural emphasis on utopian ideals of cooperation and enlightenment.

Unlike the design process of most other alien races where their concepts would be focused outside of a human being's frame of understanding, Rhodes noted that for the asari, the process went in the opposite direction as they were "idealized". More alien-looking or unconventional designs for the asari were made, but were discarded for their lack of attractiveness from a human perspective. Due to budget concerns, BioWare realized they would be unable to make both male and female versions for each of the races, which led to the creation of an all-female one. Rhodes recalled that a drawing for a male asari individual was concepted by a team member, but it has since been lost.

Rhodes noted that the silhouette of the asari's fringe was originally concepted as a hair style, and the final design of the species' hair fins mainly arose from the designers' experimentation with different shapes. He indicated that the spiny fins hinted at the species' capability as a potential threat, as the asari would have developed over millennia of conflict and interactions with their environments. The asari's fins, also described as scalp tentacles, evoke the image of a woman "emerging from the water with her hair swept back". Inspiration was drawn mainly from sports-gear, such as climbing and scuba gear, particularly its "pliable, flexible" qualities. After the addition of the hair fins, the asari looked more aquatic, and thus their design was altered to fit with that; this also led to the writers altering the asari home climate to be more wet. Their clothing is meant to be both "alluring and sexy" while keeping a sense of "class and style", akin to a "Hollywood red carpet feel". Different silhouettes of clothing were made by the design team trying to find looks that a woman would wear, which would appear both futuristic but not "too far", while also keeping with the kind of clothes that would be worn in more aquatic environments.

To help create visual variation for many of the alien faces, art director Derek Watts came up with the idea of different face paints and tattoos, which were added to many of the races. Like many other races, asari too use facepaints, which helped with diversifying the characters. The asari's anthropomorphic faces, derived from face scans of professional models as well as manual tweaks performed by team members, helped make asari characters distinct from each other.

== Attributes ==
=== Biology ===
The asari homeworld, Thessia, is rich with Element Zero, a fictional material which, when subjected to an electric current, releases dark energy. Within series lore, Element Zero is so abundant on Thessia that the water and soil contain large amounts of it, thus life on Thessia has adapted and evolved to its presence, including the asari's natural affinity for biotic abilities. While the asari mostly closely resemble humans in terms of biology, their blood color is markedly different due to the presence of Element Zero, which causes a violet-blue coloration at a molecular scale.

The asari have been variously described as all-female and mono-gendered, or hermaphroditic and sexually ambiguous. Most asari choose to use feminine third-person, singular personal pronouns as an efficient means of conversing with gender binary species on terms they could understand. The asari are evolutionarily conditioned to be pansexual and panromantic, biologically capable of procreating with any sentient life form, and can reproduce with any known sex, gender or species—asari genes are entirely dominant, their offspring are always asari, regardless of their "father's" genetic species, which has led to in-universe claims of asari promiscuity. Instead of trading cellular material directly like other biological organisms, asari reproduce by "melding": linking their nervous systems with their partner's and utilizing the electrical pattern of their partner's system to provide a template for half the DNA of their resulting child.

A small section of the asari population is affected by a genetic condition which manifests at sexual maturity and develops over time, causing the death of whomever the individual mates with instead of reproducing offspring. Known as Ardat-Yakshi or "demon of the night winds" in the asari language, these individuals are offered the chance to accept a monastic life of supervised asceticism upon diagnosis in order to overcome the psychological needs of their condition, but some are addicted to the "ecstasy" that advances with each fatal union. In Mass Effect 3 the Ardat-Yakshi serve as a basis for the Banshee, synthetic-organic creatures described in designer notes as "the Reaper version of an asari Matriarch". The Banshee's silhouette is wispy and intimidating as a result of being stretched taller by the Reapers' conversion process.

Asari can live for over a thousand years, and go through three developmental psychology stages of life: the Maiden stage, where they explore the world out of curiosity and restlessness, with many trying their hand at dancing in bars or working as mercenaries during this time; the Matron stage, where they begin to feel the desire to settle down to raise children; and finally the Matriarch stage, where they are often elevated as leaders of their communities, dispensing wisdom from centuries of life experience.

=== Culture ===
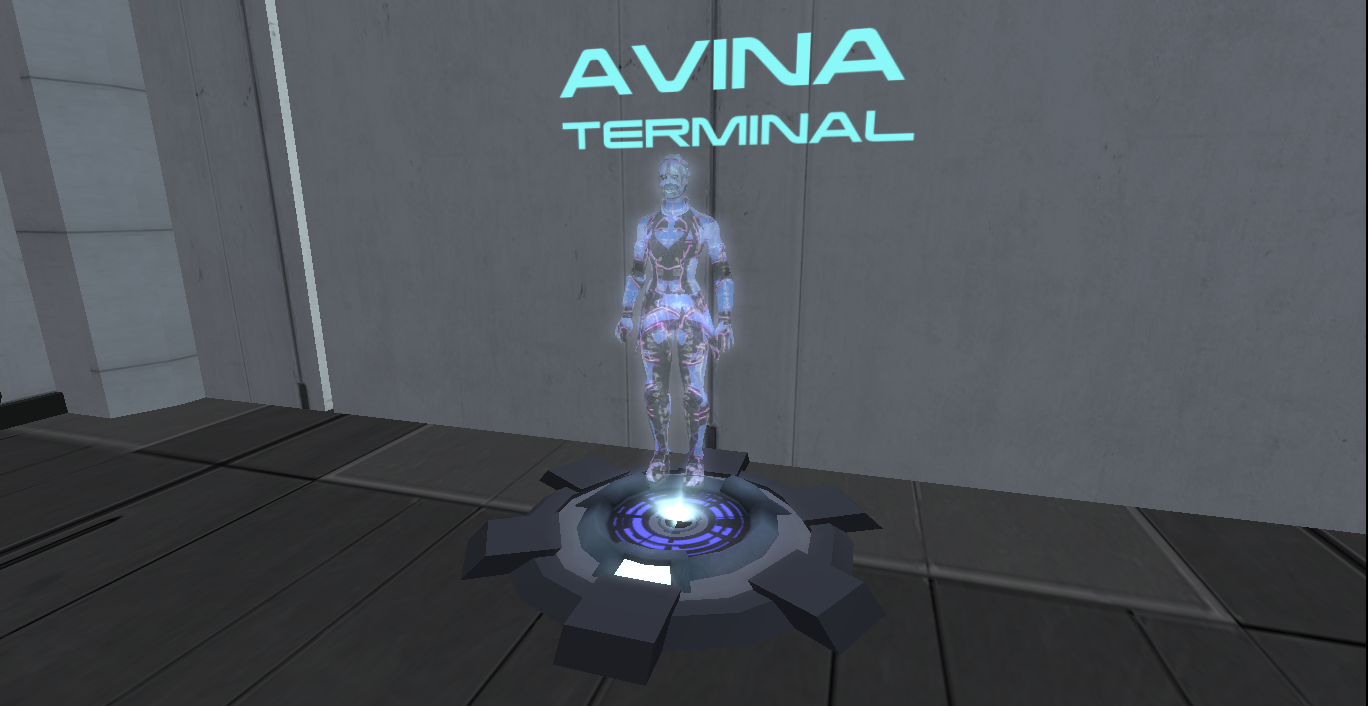
Avina, the VI hologram integrated into various Citadel information terminals, adopts the silhouette of an asari.

The asari's long lifespan makes them comfortable with observation and centuries long planning, and influences their conservative yet convivial attitude toward other species and their belief that their pluralistic worldviews, ideologies and values will inevitably shape the general galactic culture in the long term. In diplomacy, this manifests in a tendency to soft power centrism for the asari, as they seek millennia-spanning investments to maintain stable balances of economic, political, and military power.

The asari were the first to discover the Citadel, and proposed the creation of a multispecies governing council after they made first contact with the salarians. As part of the Citadel Council, they serve as its "mediators and centrists". The asari have the largest economy of all the Milky Way species; their economic power and diplomatic reputation allowing them to wield persuasive influence throughout the galaxy. In spite of their galactic-wide influence, the asari do not have a single organized world government; politically, Thessia is composed of loose confederacies known as the Asari Republics which are similar in concept to the polis of Ancient Greece. Policy is decided through the ebb and flow of public opinion within sprawling but well-organized electronic democratic institutions, with the opinions of local Matriarchs being treated with deference and the closest analogue to an executive decision-making body. The military strength of each Asari Republic is essentially a collection of local warrior bands which are not sufficiently organized for large-scale military campaigns but nevertheless have individual members who are well-armed and exceptionally skilled in biotic abilities. An asari commando, who is dressed in a tight military style as opposed to the flowing clothing preferred by asari civilians, is more powerful than the best human biotic adept, whereas lack of biotic talent will exempt an asari individual from military service.

The visual design of asari architecture is inspired by the work of Spanish architect Santiago Calatrava. The smooth curves and horizontal lines of Nos Astra, the capital of the asari-influenced world Illium reinforce the signature Mass Effect style. A typical building in Thessia is characterized by large, swooping curves, while the Temple of Athame where Commander Shepard uncovers a secret artifact in Mass Effect 3 has upward-swooping lines like a cathedral. The worship of the goddess Athame was originally the predominant mainstream religion before the asari achieved spaceflight. Siari is the most popular religion in contemporary asari society, which is grounded on pantheism and the belief that all life is fundamentally similar.

== Appearances ==
The asari first appear in Mass Effect: Revelation, the franchise's inaugural media installment. The Citadel Council is introduced in Revelation and is presented as the governing body and ultimate authority in Citadel space: the councilors pass judgement for violations of Council law, settle disputes between interstellar governments, and occasionally provide direct intervention in the form of special operations by delegating to its special forces personnel, the Spectres, which count asari commandoes among their number. A representative from the asari is always a member of the Council along with the salarians and the turians. In the video games, asari characters are encountered either as non-player characters or enemy units in innumerable missions and scenarios. Several asari character variants are playable in the multiplayer modes of Mass Effect 3 and Mass Effect: Andromeda. Asari characters are featured prominently in several Mass Effect media including novels, comics, and an animated film, either as main or supporting characters.

Asari characters are first encountered in Mass Effect following the departure of the SSV Normandy from the human colony Eden Prime. Councilor Tevos features as the asari representative of the Citadel Council during the game's events, and depending on Shepard's actions, can be killed during the final battle. Matriarch Benezia, a notable leader among her people, is initially sighted as an aide of the rogue turian Spectre Saren Arterius on board the Reaper Sovereign; she is later encountered in the planet Noveria as a boss, supported by a squad of asari commandoes. One of her subordinates, Shiala, is encountered on the planet Feros where she had been absorbed by the Thorian, an ancient sentient plant-like creature capable of mind control abilities and creating clone copies of Shiala to use as its avatars; her once-blue skin had turned a shade of green as a lasting result of being integrated into the Thorian's physiology. Benezia's daughter, Liara T'Soni, is located on the world of Therum by Commander Shepard, where she joins the crew of the SSV Normandy afterwards as a party member and plays a pivotal role in discovering the location of Ilos, a lost Prothean world which contains an artifact sought by Saren.

Mass Effect 2 introduces Illium, a colony world operated by asari corporate interests which serves as an entrepôt between the Terminus Systems and the Asari Republics, as one of its primary settings. Numerous asari characters appear either as allies or enemies. Two notable asari who first appear in Mass Effect 2 include Aria T'Loak, the de facto ruler of the space station Omega, an important hub in the Terminus Systems, and the owner of the Afterlife nightclub; and Samara, a potential companion of Commander Shepard and a member of the Justicars, a class of extrajudicial law enforcement officers and executioners operating almost exclusively within asari territory. Samara's subplot introduces the Ardat-Yakshi into series lore, and involves her hunt for her Ardat-Yakshi daughter Morinth. In the Lair of the Shadow Broker DLC, Liara temporarily joins Shepard as a companion in Illium, where she avoids an attempt on her life by an asari Spectre who is secretly an agent of the Shadow Broker. She assumes the role of the Shadow Broker after locating and killing the incumbent.

In Mass Effect 3, Liara reunites with Shepard at a Mars research facility, where she has discovered plans for the Crucible, a Prothean superweapon theorized to be capable of defeating the Reapers. Numerous asari worlds are invaded by the Reapers during the progression of the game's narrative, including Illium and their homeworld of Thessia. The Banshee, altered from asari with the Ardat-Yakshi genetic condition, is introduced as a new enemy type and recurring element of the Reapers' ground forces. Following an unsuccessful incursion in the krogan homeworld of Tuchanka by Reaper forces, the asari councilor (either Tevos should she have survived the events of the first game, or her successor Irissa should she have perished) is saved by Shepard, who is simultaneously gathering information on a concept known as "the Catalyst", from a coup attempt at the Citadel by the human supremacist paramilitary group Cerberus. The asari councilor later provides Shepard with a lead about a classified artifact secretly housed at the Temple of Athame in Thessia, which may have connections to the Catalyst as well as the completion of the Crucible. The artifact is revealed to be a Prothean beacon containing a VI called Vendetta, whereas information discovered in the temple indicated that Athame is in fact a guise crafted by the Protheans, with the implication that they have intervened in asari development during antiquity and may be responsible for the asari's natural ability to develop biotics, a notion emphasized by the Prothean squad mate Javik if he is present. Shepard may also assist Aria T'Loak with retaking Omega station from Cerberus forces in the Omega DLC.

In Mass Effect: Andromeda, the asari are one of the Milky Way species participating in the Andromeda Initiative, a civilian project which sends settlers on board "ark ships" on a one-way trip to the Andromeda Galaxy prior to the events of Mass Effect 3. Two asari characters join the crew of the Andromeda Initiative Survey Ship Tempest: Dr. Lexi T'Perro, a medical doctor who arrived in the Andromeda Galaxy on board the human Ark ship, and Pelessaria "Peebee" B'Sayle, who accompanies the human Pathfinder as a squad mate or companion.

== Promotion and reception ==
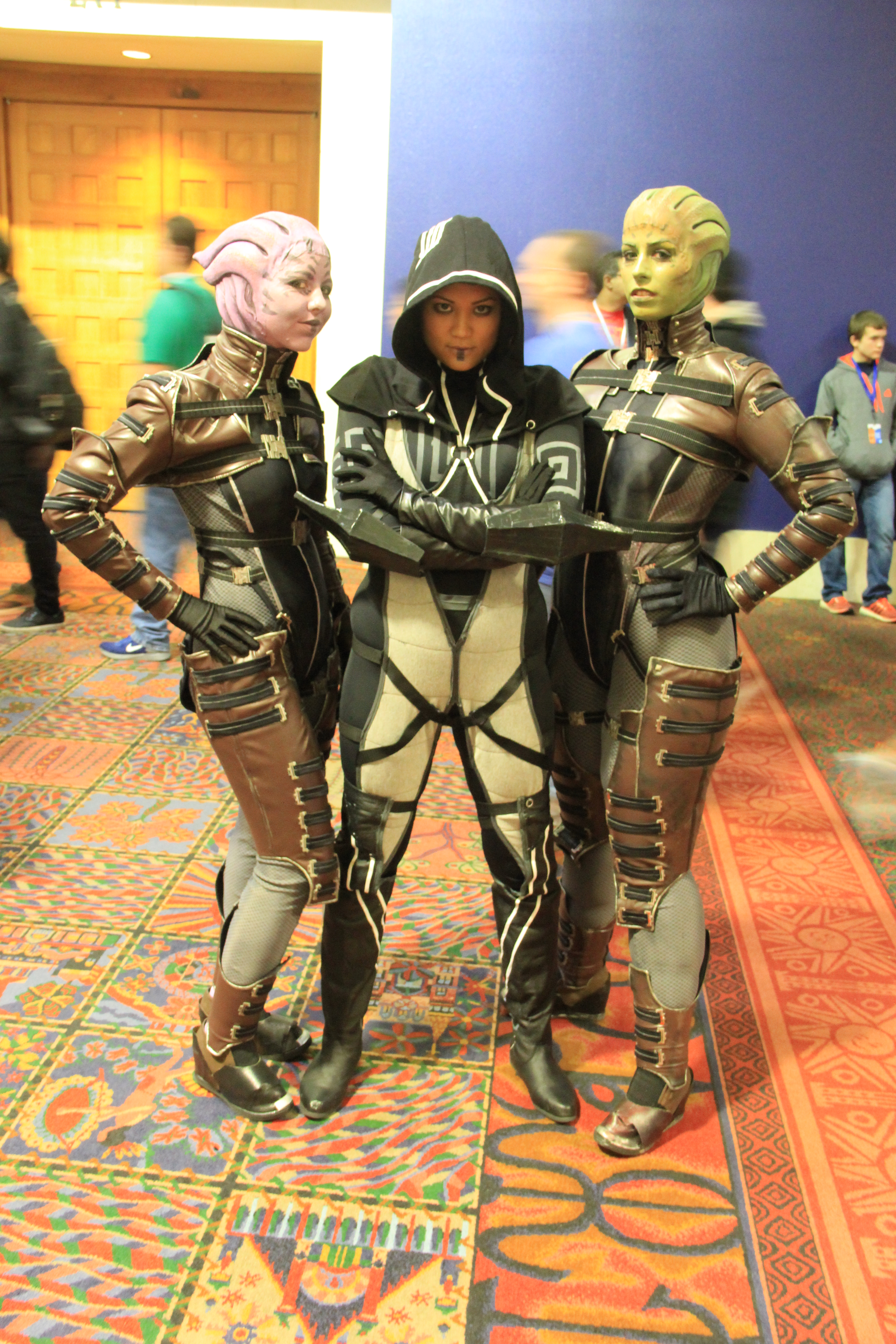
Mass Effect fans at PAX South 2015, two of whom cosplayed as asari characters.

The asari are featured as a themed skin for Anthem player characters, released on November 7, 2019, in commemoration of "N7 Day", an informal celebration of the Mass Effect franchise observed annually.

The asari has been the subject of varied critical commentary; most critics recognize the asari's potential as a form of social commentary as well as a critical exploration of gender identities, but differed on opinion with regards to the effectiveness of their depiction within the series. Bob Mackey from 1UP highlighted the paradox of their role within the series as its most dignified race due to their "long-lived and well-preserved nature", as well as a blatant substitute "for all the green alien babes that Captain James T. Kirk would bed". Lucas summarized the polarized opinions of the asari as "intelligent, thoughtful, sensual, over sexualized, objectified, infantilized".

In her article published by Central European University in December 2015, Eva Edina Zekany argued that the asari could have been subject of vigorous discussion by anyone with an interest in analyzing the "subtleties of gender, sex, and nonheteronormativity", and yet they are "most commonly coded as embodiments of traditional femininity" within the series and by the fandom as a whole, which supersedes their potential as signifiers of a genderless sexuality. Ryan Winterhalte from 1UP.com alleged that the asari as one of three areas where Mass Effect 2 was sexist, citing how they were always eye candy and questioning the appearance of Samara and Matriarch Benezia, and concluded that BioWare's work in diversifying the race seemed "wasted". Mumu Lin from the Daily Californian criticized the overall depictions of the asari in the original trilogy as "straight male fantasy" as opposed to realistic writing, claiming that this shows the anthropocentric views of the game's writers when attempting to come up with a "diverse" world. She noted that in the Mass Effect series, female identifying aliens tend to align with depictions of human cisgender women in other popular media or do not appear at all until much later in the series due to the writers' "limited view of possibilities in alien races".

In an article published by Glixel, Amanda Hudgins analyzed Lucas' presentation on the asari at the GDC 2018 Game Narrative Summit in March 2018. Hudgins remarked that the asari life cycle is about "community and self-actualization"; noting that the species are a conscious reaction to a sexist 1960s science fiction trope, she argued that it would be in the developer's best interest to continue its subversive portrayal of the asari as seen in the most recent games as it increases the franchise's inclusivity and profitability. Evan Narcisse, in an article published by The Atlantic, highlighted in-game dialogue between Liara T'Soni and Commander Shepard about mainstream asari culture being pro-diversification and pro-multiculturalism, which he believed to be "an incredibly progressive organizing principle for a whole society". He was moved by the notion that "there's a whole society that actually encourages mating outside the tribe", noting he had personal experience dealing with the scornful experiences from society towards interracial relationships. In a 2020 article, Stacey Henley from VG247 observed that the Mass Effect series have since moved away from an initially crude and fetishistic portrayal of the species in the first game and asari characters began to gain more agency and prominence as nuanced characters in more recent installments. She disclosed that she relates strongly to the asari as she experiences gender dysphoria and is transgender, and that she finds comfort in BioWare's overall depiction of the species in Mass Effect media.

The asari is considered to be synonymous with the Mass Effect franchise. Susana Polo from Polygon described as the asari as "possibly the most infamous alien race to appear in the Mass Effect series". Digital Spy opined that "almost everyone could name the game, if not the race" if they are shown a visual image of the asari. Mike Suszek, of Joystiq, cited them as his favourite fictional race in video games, commenting that the asari as a whole intrigued him, "from their intellectual ways and place in the universe to their biotic prowess." Brittany Ferrendi from South California Gay News consider the asari to be collectively one of the best non-binary video game characters. Fans have embraced the asari as a popular choice for fan art as well as cosplay at gaming and science fiction conventions since the franchise's inception.

=== Analysis ===
GameSpot uploaded a video in April 2012 which analyzed the plausibility of life in other parts of the universe, and if complex extraterrestrial life exists, the probability of convergent evolution which the Mass Effect series has adopted for the conception of most of its alien races. The asari's physiology and gender status was compared to that of hermaphroditic animal species found on Earth, such as snails.

In Chapter 4 of the 2017 book Digital Love: Romance and Sexuality in Games, Alexandra Lucas analyzed the asari life cycle, which is inspired by the Triple Goddess archetype, and suggested that it promotes a comprehensive representation of female sexuality in video games.

Jordan Youngblood drew attention to the parallels between the Ardat-Yakshi and the term sinthomosexuality as proposed by Lee Edelman: "the cultural fantasy that conjures homosexuality, and with it the definitional importance of sex in our imagining of homosexuality, in intimate relation to a fatal, and even murderous, jouissance". Youngblood considered Ardat-Yakshi characters like Samara's daughter Morinth to be representations of the "fatal lure of sterile, narcissistic enjoyments" as well as problematic assumptions about the lives of queer-identifying individuals.
