= The Second Civil War =

1997 Black Comedy Film

- Promotional poster
- Genre: Black comedy, political satire
- Written by: Martyn Burke
- Directed by: Joe Dante
- Starring: Beau Bridges Phil Hartman James Earl Jones Denis Leary Joanna Cassidy Dan Hedaya Elizabeth Peña James Coburn Ron Perlman
- Theme music composer: Hummie Mann
- Country of origin: United States
- Original language: English

Production
- Executive producers: Chip Diggins; Barry Levinson
- Producer: Guy Riedel
- Cinematography: Mac Ahlberg
- Editor: Marshall Harvey
- Running time: 98 minutes
- Production companies: Baltimore Pictures; HBO Pictures

Original release
- Network: HBO
- Release: March 15, 1997

The Second Civil War is a satirical black comedy television film directed by Joe Dante for the HBO cable television network, first aired on March 15, 1997. The film details the build-up to an ethnically fueled civil war in an alternate future United States as a result of unsustainably excessive immigration, political self-interest, and ratings-pursuing news media.

The film stars James Earl Jones, Elizabeth Peña, and Denis Leary as reporters for a CNN-like cable network, "NewsNet" (referred to in on-screen graphics as "NN"); Beau Bridges as the governor of Idaho; Phil Hartman as the U.S. President; James Coburn as his chief advisor; and William Schallert as the Secretary of Defense. Brian Keith portrayed a general in one of his final movie roles.

== Plot ==
In a future United States, immigration has rapidly increased, resulting in a fractured multicultural society. The Mayor of Los Angeles speaks only in Spanish, Rhode Island is populated mostly by Chinese Americans, and Alabama has a Sikh congressman. Politics have been openly reduced to a matter of catering to various ethnic groups for their votes, and media-fueled polarization has led to widespread anxiety, with viewership of cable news, including channel NewsNet, at all time highs.

When an atomic weapon is used on Pakistan by India, an international organization makes plans to bring refugee orphans to Idaho. NewsNet embeds a reporter on the plane and airs footage of crying Pakistani children in order to boost ratings. As Idaho has already received over a million refugees, Idaho Governor Jim Farley (Beau Bridges) orders the Idaho National Guard to close its borders, citing public safety. Despite claiming to be a nativist, Farley routinely indulges in Mexican food, Mexican soap operas, and an affair with a Mexican American NewsNet reporter (Elizabeth Peña). As she live-translates an impassioned speech from Los Angeles' mayor vowing a reconquest of the lands of the old Spanish Empire within the United States, she grows increasingly angry at Farley's decision, before the speech is interrupted by an assassination attempt from black Angelenos seeking to reclaim the city from Hispanics. Farley is dismayed at his mistress' anger, and, despite the best efforts of his press secretary Jimmy Cannon (Kevin Dunn), remains largely oblivious to the growing implications of the crisis.

Meanwhile, the President of the United States (Phil Hartman) turns out to be an entirely ineffectual leader, ruthlessly exploiting immigration to fill districts and states with those most likely to vote for his own party. Reputed to be indecisive, the President delegates his decision-making entirely to his advisors, most notably his unofficial chief advisor, lobbyist Jack B. Buchan (James Coburn), who concerns himself entirely with the President's public image and media perception of the administration. Buchan regularly influences the President's decisions by manipulating his desire to emulate previous U.S. presidents, even going so far as to pepper pre-written presidential statements with fictitious "quotes" from Dwight D. Eisenhower. Buchan directs the President to "be decisive", and the President orders Farley to open the Idaho border to the refugees within 72 hours, before shortening the deadline to 67 1/2 hours in order to prevent the news from causing an unpopular interruption to Susan Lucci's farewell appearance on the soap opera All My Children.

As the deadline approaches, the Governor and the President call in, respectively, the Idaho National Guard and the United States Army. Tensions rise when the commanders of both units turn out to be bitter rivals from the Gulf War. Media descends on the border, drawing national attention to the conflict, and NewsNet orders its reporters to continue focusing on the faces of the refugees for ratings. The Governors of Montana and North Dakota send in their own National Guard units to oppose federal military forces, resulting in even worsening nationwide polarization, which comes to a head when Mexican-American pro-immigrant rioters bomb the Alamo.

After losing the support of Representatives from Alabama for not providing them money for Sikh gurdwaras despite India's atomic bombing of Pakistan, the President attempts to rely on Chinese-Americans, a core constituency, only to find out that the Governor of Rhode Island has sent their National Guard to support Farley's stance that states should be able to close their borders, due to the White House previously announcing a deal with the Chinese-American community's rivals, the Nation of Islam, and its leader, Congressman Nkomo, to gain Black-controlled electoral votes. The President attempts to shore up his numbers by making appeals to Korean Americans instead, but finds that there simply are not enough Korean American votes. As the President prepares to grant visas to two million Koreans to increase the Korean American vote share, he is informed by the Joint Chiefs that anti-immigrant terrorists have retaliated the Alamo bombing by destroying the Statue of Liberty, claiming that "we do not want your huddled masses anymore". Upon seeing their own reporting of the destroyed monument, already exhausted NewsNet employees begin to argue about their roles in stoking conflict and eventually start to physically fight.

Eventually, Governor Farley's girlfriend becomes pregnant, convincing him to back down from the conflict and resign, but it is too late to avoid conflict. U.S. Army soldiers see news coverage of the destroyed Statue of Liberty and mutiny, causing them to be court-martialed on the spot. As they await the firing squad, one of the soldiers implores his executioners to "go ahead and kill America", claiming that there's "nothing left" of the American nation, and that the country is now merely run by "politicians and executives who hire people in places we don't live". This speech and the execution are caught on live television by NewsNet, causing more mutinies. The President orders the Joint Chiefs of Staff to suppress these mutinies, but all armored divisions nearby are unable to respond, as the manufacture of replacement parts had been outsourced to Taiwan, which had previously embargoed these parts due to an argument between the President and the Taiwanese Prime Minister.

As the situation continues to deteriorate, the decision is made by one side (left unclear) to attack, resulting in a major battle between the U.S. Army and Idaho National Guard. The President makes the decision to invade Idaho, starting the Second American Civil War. The film closes with a series of news reports aired after the conflict that indicate hostilities have ceased and the President has resigned, though the immigration system remains unchanged.

== Cast ==
- Beau Bridges as Governor Jim Farley
- Joanna Cassidy as Helena Newman
- Phil Hartman as The President
- James Earl Jones as Jim Kalla
- James Coburn as Jack Buchan
- Dan Hedaya as Mel Burgess
- Elizabeth Peña as Christina
- Denis Leary as Vinnie Franko
- Ron Perlman as Alan Manieski
- William Schallert as Secretary of Defense
- Kevin McCarthy as Chief of Staff
- Catherine Lloyd Burns as Amelia Sims
- Kevin Dunn as Jimmy Cannon
- Shelley Malil as Congressman Singh
- Larry "Flash" Jenkins as Kenya Nkomo
- Dick Miller as Eddie O'Neill
- Brian Keith as Major General Charles Buford
- Richard Gross as Militia Leader
- Roger Corman as Sandy Collins
- Hank Stratton as Blaine Gorman
- Alexandra Wilson as Caroline Dawes
- Johnny Luckett as Captain
- Jerry Hardin as Colonel McNally
- Dave Georgi as Major
- Dana Lee as Chinese Colonel
- Stogie Kenyatta Firing Squad Officer
- Sean Lawlor as Brendan
- Leah Gale as White House Reporter
- John Wesley as Chairman of the Joint Chiefs
- Ben Masters as Matthew Langford
- Rance Howard as Arnold Tooney Jr.
- Robert Picardo as Godfrey
- Jim Lau as Chinese Congressman
- Nathaniel Goodman as Christina's Cameraman
- Jodi Verdu as NewsNet Technician #1
- Jamison Yang as NewsNet Technician #2
- Paul Guyot as NewsNet Technician #3
- Terry Knight as Boise Reporter
- Anthony Lee as Steven Kingsley
- Eve Brenner as Elderly Militia Woman
- Scott Atkinson as Young Militia Man
- Christine Jane Newman as Militia Child
- Darryl Van Leer as Mohammed Amin
- Sonny Skyhawk as Indian

== Production ==
Principal photography on the film took place in Sacramento, California, from September through November 1996.

== Release and reception ==
The Second Civil War was broadcast on HBO on March 15, 1997, and released on home video in the United States on October 21, 1997.

The film was shown in theaters in Italy, Portugal, the Netherlands and France in 1997 and 1998, before being released to home video. In Australia, the film was released directly to video in April/May 1998. The DVD was released in 2005.

On the review aggregator website Rotten Tomatoes, 62% of 29 critics' reviews are positive. The website's consensus reads: "The Second Civil War mingles biting political satire with broad humor and witty performances, delivering laugh-out-loud moments even as some tasteless excess undermines its otherwise scathing impact."

Beau Bridges won the 1997 Emmy Award for Outstanding Supporting Actor in a Miniseries or a Special.
