= List of Mass Effect media =

Franchise of video games and media

Logo of the Mass Effect series

Mass Effect is a science fiction media franchise set in the 22nd century, developed by the Canadian video game company BioWare. Composed of multi-platform video games and associated media, the core of the franchise is an eponymous trilogy of action role-playing third-person shooter video games, released between 2007 and 2012, which follow Commander Shepard's mission to save the galaxy from a race of mechanical beings known as the Reapers. A fourth main series game, Mass Effect: Andromeda, was released in 2017. The Mass Effect franchise also includes three mobile games, each with a different gameplay style; seven novels, some written by BioWare writers and some by science fiction authors; four art books; ten comic book series or mini-comics and their anthologies; a coloring book; an animated film; a 3D theme park ride; and eleven soundtrack albums or singles.

The video games have had high sales, with the last major game of the original trilogy, Mass Effect 3, shipping over 3.5 million copies in its first week of release. Reception of other media in the franchise has been mixed: the comics, such as Mass Effect: Redemption, have been praised for their writing, and novels such as Mass Effect: Revelation have been recommended to fans of the games; but Mass Effect: Deception was derided as inconsistent with the main trilogy. The first part of the franchise—the first game—was published in 2007, while the latest game was published in 2017 and the latest piece of media in 2024.

== Video games ==
=== Main series ===
Main series
Game	Details
Mass Effect Original release date(s): NA: November 20, 2007; AU: November 22, 2007; EU: November 23, 2007; JP: May 21, 2009	Release years by system: 2007 – Xbox 360; 2008 – Microsoft Windows; 2012 – PlayStation 3; 2021 – PlayStation 4, Xbox One (Legendary Edition)
Mass Effect Original release date(s): NA: November 20, 2007; AU: November 22, 2007; EU: November 23, 2007; JP: May 21, 2009	Notes: Developed by BioWare; Microsoft Windows port developed by Demiurge Studios and PlayStation 3 port developed by Edge of Reality; Published by Microsoft Studios on Xbox 360; ports published by Electronic Arts; Additionally released as a part of the Mass Effect Trilogy compilation (2012) and the Mass Effect Legendary Edition remaster compilation (2021); Expansions: "Bring Down the Sky" (2008); "Pinnacle Station" (2009)
Mass Effect 2 Original release date(s): NA: January 26, 2010; EU: January 29, 2010; AU: January 28, 2010; JP: January 13, 2011	Release years by system: 2010 – Microsoft Windows, Xbox 360; 2011 – PlayStation 3; 2021 – PlayStation 4, Xbox One (Legendary Edition)
Mass Effect 2 Original release date(s): NA: January 26, 2010; EU: January 29, 2010; AU: January 28, 2010; JP: January 13, 2011	Notes: Developed by BioWare; Published by Electronic Arts; Additionally released as a part of the Mass Effect Trilogy compilation (2012) and the Mass Effect Legendary Edition remaster compilation (2021); Expansions: "Normandy Crash Site" (2010); "Zaeed – The Price of Revenge" (2010); "Firewalker" (2010); "Kasumi – Stolen Memory" (2010); "Overlord" (2010); "Lair of the Shadow Broker" (2010); "Arrival" (2011)
Mass Effect 3 Original release date(s): NA: March 6, 2012; EU: March 9, 2012; AU: March 6, 2012; JP: March 15, 2012	Release years by system: 2012 – Microsoft Windows, PlayStation 3, Wii U, Xbox 360; 2021 – PlayStation 4, Xbox One (Legendary Edition)
Mass Effect 3 Original release date(s): NA: March 6, 2012; EU: March 9, 2012; AU: March 6, 2012; JP: March 15, 2012	Notes: Developed by BioWare; Wii U port developed by Straight Right under the name Mass Effect 3: Special Edition; Published by Electronic Arts; Additionally released as a part of the Mass Effect Trilogy compilation (2012) and the Mass Effect Legendary Edition remaster compilation (2021); Expansions: "From Ashes" (2012); "Extended Cut" (2012); "Leviathan" (2012); "Omega" (2012); "Citadel" (2013)
Mass Effect: Andromeda Original release date(s): March 21, 2017	Release years by system: 2017 – Microsoft Windows, Xbox One, PlayStation 4
Mass Effect: Andromeda Original release date(s): March 21, 2017	Notes: Developed by BioWare; Published by Electronic Arts

=== Mobile games ===
Other games
Game	Details
Mass Effect Galaxy Original release date(s): WW: June 22, 2009	Release years by system: 2009 – iOS
Mass Effect Galaxy Original release date(s): WW: June 22, 2009	Notes: Developed by BioWare; Published by Electronic Arts; Top-down shooter featuring backstory for Jacob Taylor from Mass Effect 2
Mass Effect Infiltrator Original release date(s): WW: March 6, 2012	Release years by system: 2012 – Android, iOS; 2013 – BlackBerry
Mass Effect Infiltrator Original release date(s): WW: March 6, 2012	Notes: Developed by IronMonkey Studios; Published by Electronic Arts; Third-person shooter side story to Mass Effect 3

=== Companion apps ===
Other games
Game	Details
Mass Effect: Datapad Original release date(s): WW: March 13, 2012	Release years by system: 2012 – iOS
Mass Effect: Datapad Original release date(s): WW: March 13, 2012	Notes: Developed by BioWare; Published by Electronic Arts; Minigame companion app to Mass Effect 3
Mass Effect: Andromeda APEX HQ Original release date(s): WW: March 20, 2017	Release years by system: 2017 – iOS, Android
Mass Effect: Andromeda APEX HQ Original release date(s): WW: March 20, 2017	Notes: Developed by BioWare; Published by Electronic Arts; Companion app to Mass Effect: Andromeda

== Printed media ==
=== Books ===
Books
Title	Release date	ISBN	Media type	Ref.
Mass Effect: Revelation	May 1, 2007	978-0-345-49816-8	Novelization	
Written by Drew Karpyshyn; Published by Del Rey Books; A prequel story to Mass Effect
The Art of Mass Effect	November 20, 2007	978-0-7615-5851-4	Concept art	
Edited by Fernando Bueno; Published by Prima Games; Concept art and BioWare commentary on Mass Effect
Mass Effect: Ascension	July 29, 2008	978-0-345-49852-6	Novelization	
Written by Drew Karpyshyn; Published by Del Rey Books; A sequel story to Mass Effect
Mass Effect: Retribution	July 27, 2010	978-0-345-52072-2	Novelization	
Written by Drew Karpyshyn; Published by Del Rey Books; A sequel story to Mass Effect 2
Mass Effect: Deception	January 31, 2012	978-0-345-52073-9	Novelization	
Written by William C. Dietz; Published by Del Rey Books; A sequel story to Mass Effect: Retribution
The Art of the Mass Effect Universe	February 8, 2012	978-1-59582-768-5	Concept art	
Written by Casey Hudson and Derek Watts; Artwork by BioWare; Published by Dark Horse Comics; Concept art and BioWare commentary on the Mass Effect game trilogy
Mass Effect: The Poster Collection	August 12, 2015	978-1-61655-742-3	Concept art	
Artwork by BioWare; Published by Dark Horse Comics; Concept art, with each page detachable for use as a poster
Mass Effect - Andromeda: Nexus Uprising	March 21, 2017	978-1-78565-156-4	Tie-in book to Mass Effect: Andromeda	
Written by Jason M. Hough and K. C. Alexander; Published by Titan Books; A prequel story to Mass Effect: Andromeda
Mass Effect Adult Coloring Book	March 1, 2017	978-1-5067-0287-2	Coloring book	
Artwork by Juann Cabal, Ron Chan, Gabriel Guzman, Andres Ponce, and Martin Tunica; Published by Dark Horse Comics; Adult coloring book, including images from the original trilogy and Mass Effect: Andromeda
The Art of Mass Effect: Andromeda	March 21, 2017	978-1-5067-0075-5	Concept art	
Artwork by Bioware; Published by Dark Horse Comics; Concept art from Mass Effect: Andromeda
Mass Effect - Andromeda: Annihilation	November 6, 2017	978-1-78565-158-8	Tie-in book to Mass Effect: Andromeda	
Written by Catherynne M. Valente; Published by Titan Books; A prequel story to Mass Effect: Andromeda
Mass Effect - Andromeda: Initiation	November 28, 2017	978-1-78565-160-1	Tie-in book to Mass Effect: Andromeda	
Written by N. K. Jemisin and Mac Walters; Published by Titan Books; A prequel story to Mass Effect: Andromeda
The Art of the Mass Effect Trilogy: Expanded Edition	February 23, 2021	978-1-5067-2163-7	Concept art	
Artwork by BioWare; Published by Dark Horse Comics; Concept art and commentary on the original trilogy and its DLC

=== Comics ===
Comics
Title	Release date(s)	Media type	Ref.
Mass Effect: Redemption	January 6, 2010—April 7, 2010	Comic book series	
Written by Mac Walters and John Jackson Miller, art by Omar Francia; Published by Dark Horse Comics; A four-part mini-series set shortly before Mass Effect 2 featuring Liara T'Soni; Released as a single book by Dark Horse Comics on June 9, 2010 (ISBN 978-1-59582-481-3)
Mass Effect: Incursion	June 21, 2010	Mini-comic	
Written by Mac Walters, art by Eduardo Francisco; Published by Dark Horse Comics for free online; An eight-page mini-comic set shortly before Mass Effect 2 featuring Aria T'Loak
Mass Effect: Inquisition	October 24, 2010	Mini-comic	
Written by Mac Walters, art by Jean Diaz; Published by Dark Horse Comics for free online; An eight-page mini-comic set shortly after Mass Effect 2 featuring Armando-Owen Bailey
Mass Effect: Evolution	January 19, 2011—April 20, 2011	Comic book series	
Written by Mac Walters and John Jackson Miller, art by Omar Francia; Published by Dark Horse Comics; A four-part mini-series prequel story to Mass Effect featuring Jack Harper (Illusive Man); Released as a single book by Dark Horse Comics on September 21, 2011 (ISBN 978-1-59582-759-3)
Mass Effect: Conviction	September 1, 2011	Mini-comic	
Written by Mac Walters, art by Eduardo Francisco; Published by Dark Horse Comics for free digitally through select retailers; A ten-page mini-comic set before Mass Effect 3 featuring James Vega
Mass Effect: Invasion	October 19, 2011—January 18, 2012	Comic book series	
Written by Mac Walters and John Jackson Miller, art by Omar Francia; Published by Dark Horse Comics; A four-part mini-series set after Mass Effect 2 featuring Aria T'Loak; Released as a single book by Dark Horse Comics on April 18, 2012 (ISBN 978-1-59582-867-5)
Mass Effect: Homeworlds	April 25, 2012—August 29, 2012	Comic book series	
Written by Mac Walters, art by Eduardo Francisco; Published by Dark Horse Comics; A four-part mini-series with each issue featuring backstory for a different Mass Effect 3 character; Released as a single book by Dark Horse Comics on November 7, 2012 (ISBN 978-1-59582-955-9)
Mass Effect: Blasto - Eternity is Forever	November 7, 2012	Mini-comic	
Written by Mac Walters, art by Omar Francia; Published by Dark Horse Comics; A fourteen-page mini-comic featuring Blasto, a fictional character featured in media inside the Mass Effect games
Mass Effect: He Who Laughs Best	May 4, 2013	Mini-comic	
Written by Mac Walters, art by Garry Brown; Published by Dark Horse Comics as one section of their 2013 Free Comic Book Day comic; A ten-page mini-comic set before Mass Effect featuring Jeff "Joker" Moreau
Mass Effect Library Edition Volume 1	May 15, 2013	Anthology	
Written by Mac Walters, John Jackson Miller, Jeremy Barlow, Patrick Weekes, John Dombrow, and Sylvia Feketekuty; Art by Omar Francia, Eduardo Francisco, Chris Staggs, Garry Brown, and Jean Diaz; Published by Dark Horse Comics (ISBN 978-1-61655-111-7); An anthology collection of almost all the comics to date, as well as several short stories; Includes Redemption, Incursion, Inquisition, Evolution, Conviction, Invasion, and Homeworlds; Republished as Mass Effect Omnibus Volume 1 on November 16, 2016 (ISBN 978-1-5067-0276-6)
Mass Effect: Foundation	July 24, 2013—July 23, 2014	Comic book series	
Written by Mac Walters (1–13) and Jeremy Barlow (11–13), art by Omar Francia (1), Tony Parker (2–4, 8–13), Matthew Clark (5, 6), and Garry Brown (7); Published by Dark Horse Comics; A thirteen-part series with each issue featuring side events and perspectives to the main Mass Effect trilogy; Collected into three books by Dark Horse Comics, released on February 5, 2014 (ISBN 978-1-61655-270-1), June 4, 2014 (ISBN 978-1-61655-349-4), and November 5, 2014 (ISBN 978-1-61655-488-0)
Mass Effect Library Edition Volume 2	May 6, 2015	Anthology	
Written by Mac Walters and Jeremy Barlow; Art by Omar Francia, Tony Parker, Garry Brown, and Benjamin Carre; Published by Dark Horse Comics (ISBN 978-1-61655-636-5); An anthology collection of comics since the first Library Edition anthology, plus additional artwork; Includes Foundation, He Who Laughs Best, and Blasto - Eternity is Forever; Republished as Mass Effect Omnibus Volume 2 on February 8, 2017 (ISBN 978-1-5067-0277-3)
Mass Effect: Discovery	May 24, 2017—October 25, 2017	Comic book series	
Written by Jeremy Barlow and John Dombrow, art by Gabriel Guzman; Published by Dark Horse Comics; A four-part mini-series set around the events of Mass Effect: Andromeda; Released as a single book by Dark Horse Comics on January 17, 2018 (ISBN 978-1-5067-0074-8)
Mass Effect: The Complete Comics	October 21, 2020	Anthology	
Published by Dark Horse Comics (ISBN 978-1-5067-1919-1); Collects all Mass Effect comics released to date including Redemption, Evolution, Invasion, Homeworlds, Foundation, Discovery, Incursion, Inquisition, Conviction, He Who Laughs Best, and Blasto - Eternity is Forever

== Soundtracks ==
Soundtracks
Title	Release date	Release type	Ref.
Mass Effect: Original Soundtrack	November 20, 2007	Album	
Composed by Jack Wall, Sam Hulick, Richard Jacques, and David Kates; Published by Sumthing Distribution; 37 tracks on a single disc with a duration of 1:15:56
Mass Effect 2: Original Video Game Score	January 19, 2010	Album	
Composed by Jack Wall, Sam Hulick, David Kates, Jimmy Hinson, Brian DiDomenico; Published by Electronic Arts; 27 tracks on two discs with a duration of 2:55:59
Mass Effect 2: Atmospheric	September 7, 2010	Mini-album (digital only)	
Composed by Jack Wall; Published by Electronic Arts; 9 tracks with a duration of 20:45
Mass Effect 2: Combat	October 5, 2010	Mini-album (digital only)	
Composed by Jack Wall; Published by Electronic Arts; 14 tracks with a duration of 33:48
Mass Effect 2: Kasumi's Stolen Memory	November 30, 2010	Mini-album (digital only)	
Composed by Sacha Dikiciyan and Cris Velasco; Published by Electronic Arts; 4 tracks with a duration of 10:21
Mass Effect 2: Lair of the Shadow Broker	December 14, 2010	Mini-album (digital only)	
Composed by Chris Lennertz; Published by Electronic Arts; 7 tracks with a duration of 12:33
Mass Effect 2: Overlord	December 14, 2010	Mini-album (digital only)	
Composed by Chris Lennertz; Published by Electronic Arts; 4 tracks with a duration of 6:30
Mass Effect 3: Original Soundtrack	April 24, 2012	Album	
Composed by Sam Hulick, Clint Mansell, Chris Lennertz, Cris Velasco, Sascha Dikiciyan, and Faunts; Published by Electronic Arts; 23 tracks on a single disc with a duration of 1:03:24
Mass Effect 3: Extended Cut	August 12, 2012	Mini-album (digital only)	
Composed by Sam Hulick and Clint Mansell; Published by Electronic Arts; 7 tracks with a duration of 16:57
Mass Effect: Paragon Lost Original Motion Picture Score	November 13, 2012	Album	
Composed by Joshua Mosley and David Kates; Published by Funimation; 27 tracks on a single disc with a duration of 1:09:28
Mass Effect 3: Citadel	August 8, 2013	Mini-album (digital only)	
Composed by Sam Hulick, Cris Velasco, and Sascha Dikiciyan; Published by Electronic Arts; 20 tracks with a duration of 31:05
Mass Effect Trilogy Vinyl Soundtrack	November 29, 2016	Box set	
Box set of selections from the Mass Effect 1, 2, and 3 soundtracks, as well as a bonus LP of songs; Published by Electronic Arts; Approximately 50 tracks on four vinyl records
Mass Effect: Andromeda Original Score	March 24, 2017	Album (digital only)	
Composed by John Paesano; Published by Electronic Arts; 18 tracks with a duration of 1:01:50

== Other ==
=== Film ===
Film
Title	Release date	Media type
Mass Effect: Paragon Lost	November 29, 2012	Animation
Written by Henry Gilroy and directed by Atsushi Takeuchi; Animated by Production I.G; Produced by BioWare, Funimation, and T.O Entertainment; Animated film set before Mass Effect 2; Released in select theaters on November 29, 2012, via digital download on Xbox Live, PlayStation Network, and iTunes on December 14, 2012, and on DVD and Blu-ray on December 28, 2012

=== Amusement park ===
Amusement park
Title	Release date	Media type
Mass Effect: New Earth	May 18, 2016	Theatrical amusement park ride
Designed by 3D Live with help from Halon Entertainment, Cedar Fair, and Bioware; 4½-minute, 80-person ride at California's Great America amusement park; Features a 3D film along with motion seats and physical sensations

=== Board game ===
Board game
Title	Release date	Media type
Mass Effect: The Board Game - Priority: Hagalaz	October 2024	Board game
Developed by Eric Lang and Calvin Wong Tze Loon; Published by Modiphius Entertainment; Cooperative game for 1-4 players; Additional miniature models produced
