= List of Mass Effect characters =

A poster depicting the major characters of the Mass Effect trilogy. Top row, from left to right: Saren Arterius, Illusive Man. Next row: Garrus, Commander Shepard (default male), Wrex. Last row: Thane, James, Tali, Kaidan, Ashley, Liara, Miranda, Mordin, Legion, Javik, Jack. Bottom icons: Samara, Kasumi (deceased), Jacob, Joker, EDI, Grunt, Zaeed

The crew of The Tempest led by Pathfinder Ryder in Mass Effect: Andromeda. Back row, from left to right: Vetra, Gil, Jaal. Middle row: Suvi, Drack, Ryder (default male appearance), Lexi, Liam. Front row: Peebee, Kallo, Cora.

The Mass Effect series, a military science fiction media franchise developed by Canadian video game developer BioWare and owned by American publisher Electronic Arts, features an extensive cast of characters. It is primarily based on a series of third-person role-playing shooter video games which currently consists of four mainline instalments and two spin-off mobile games. The first three Mass Effect games takes place in the Milky Way Galaxy during the 22nd century and revolves around a space navy soldier named Commander Shepard. The fourth Mass Effect game is a standalone sequel to the original trilogy but set in a different galaxy, Andromeda, and focuses on the Andromeda Initiative and the Ryder family. The spin-off games, Mass Effect Galaxy and Mass Effect Infiltrator, feature different protagonists.

This article describes characters, which includes a diverse cast of alien, human and synthetic beings, that appear in video games set in the Mass Effect universe. This list only includes player characters, squad members, major antagonists, and other notable characters that appear in the games. Certain characters have names chosen by the player; these characters are designated the name they are addressed by in-game. The appearance and story arcs of certain characters in Mass Effect 2 and Mass Effect 3 are conditional upon decisions from prior Mass Effect titles being carried over via an imported save file.

== Protagonists ==
=== Film protagonists ===
==== James Vega ====
Lieutenant James Vega is a human Systems Alliance Marine and Shepard's squad member in Mass Effect 3. James is tasked to escort Shepard to an Alliance defense committee hearing, however the hearing is interrupted when the Reapers attack Earth. James and Ashley or Kaidan, depending on who survived Virmire, retrieve the Normandy SR-2 and pick Shepard up from Earth. James is the main focus of the anime film, Mass Effect: Paragon Lost.

James is voiced by Freddie Prinze, Jr. in all media.

=== Literary protagonists ===
==== Kahlee Sanders ====
Kahlee Sanders is a protagonist of Mass Effect: Revelation and its sequels, Ascension, Retribution, and Deception Sanders is secretly the daughter of the late Rear Admiral Jon Grissom, the first Alliance hero who led a space exploration task force to travel through the Charon mass relay. She is cited as one of the most important characters in the series, and the main heroine of Mass Effect spin-off fiction. She makes her first video game appearance in Mass Effect 3 as a staff member of the Grissom Academy.

=== Video game protagonists ===
==== Commander Shepard ====
Commander Shepard is the central protagonist of the original Mass Effect trilogy of video games. On an assignment to investigate a besieged human colony, Shepard is affected by a Prothean artifact that grants them insight on the Reapers, making them the key entity to help protect the species of the Milky Way from being wiped out by the Reapers. Shepard is later named the first human Spectre by the Citadel Council, and given command of the SSV Normandy and its crew to complete their mission.

The character's given name, gender, background, and appearance are determined by the player on starting a new game, with both Mass Effect 2 and Mass Effect 3 allowing the player to import saves from previous games to carry over that version of Shepard. Depending on the choice of gender, Shepard is voiced by either Mark Meer or Jennifer Hale. The default male version's face and body is based on the likeness of fashion model Mark Vanderloo.

==== Jeff "Joker" Moreau ====
Jeff Moreau, better known by his nickname "Joker", is the pilot of the Normandy. Joker is a skilled pilot who has osteogenesis imperfecta. His nickname alludes to his tendency to behave as a sarcastic foil to other individuals he interact with. In Mass Effect 2, Joker briefly becomes a playable character when the Collectors invade the Normandy to capture its crew in the absence of Shepard and the squad. He can develop a romantic relationship with EDI in Mass Effect 3 if encouraged.

Joker is voiced by Seth Green.

==== Jacob Taylor ====
Jacob Taylor is the protagonist of Mass Effect Galaxy, a tie-in iOS game to Mass Effect 2. He is a former Systems Alliance soldier who is recruited by Miranda Lawson in Galaxy to investigate a conspiracy involving batarian terrorists. Jacob is encountered in Mass Effect 2 as an official member of Cerberus and Shepard's starting squad member, as well as a potential romantic option for a female Shepard. Unless the player imports a Mass Effect 2 saved game where Jacob does not survive the suicide mission, in Mass Effect 3 he returns as a supporting character who has defected from Cerberus, and attempts to protect other Cerberus defectors from reprisals by their former employer.

The iconic look of all Cerberus clothing in the series is derived from the designs for Jacob's armor and clothing; some involved fully armored looks, while others had only cloth, or a mix of cloth and armor. For airless or toxic environments, Jacob wears a small breather device, which allows for more facial expressivity. According to a former BioWare employee, Jacob was originally meant to be a bisexual romance option, and that animation work for romance scenes with Commander Shepard of both genders, "matching shot-for-shot from Brokeback Mountain", was completed prior to intervention from management requesting that the same sex romantic content be removed, blaming backlash from news outlets like Fox News in response to the previous game.

Jacob Taylor is voiced by Adam Lazarre-White.

Chris Thursten from PC Gamer called Jacob "the worst companion" and the culmination of his romance arc "the worst moment in Mass Effect".

==== Randall Ezno ====
Randall Ezno is the protagonist of Mass Effect Infiltrator, a third-person shooter tie-in video game to Mass Effect 3 developed for mobile devices. He is a cybernetically modified Cerberus operative who discovers that his employer is up to something nefarious, goes rogue and embarks on a mission to save his friend from Cerberus.

Randall is voiced by Jay Anthony Franke.

==== Pathfinder Ryder ====
Pathfinder Ryder is the main protagonist of Mass Effect: Andromeda, the fourth mainline installment of the Mass Effect series, and the child of Alec Ryder. Their twin sibling is Sara or Scott Ryder, depending on the player's chosen gender. The player can change their character's first name, but if the default names of Sara or Scott are kept, NPCs will occasionally refer to the character's first name in voiced dialogue.

The Ryder siblings are cryogenically frozen and dispatched alongside their father and tens of thousands of other colonists on a 600-year journey to the Andromeda galaxy, departing before the events of Mass Effect 3. The ark carrying the humans, the Hyperion, arrives at the wrong drop point, far from the forward command centre of the Andromeda Initiative, the Nexus, and cut off from contact with both it and the other arks. The player-controlled Ryder later succeeds their father as the Hyperion's Pathfinder, and is tasked with leading their crew on the command ship The Tempest, successfully settling the Heleus Cluster, and improving life aboard the Nexus, a galactic hub for the colonizer races from the Milky Way.

Scott and Sara Ryder are voiced by Tom Taylorson and Fryda Wolff, respectively.

Andromeda was known for its technical issues, particularly for the awkward facial animations of some of its characters; notably, the default face for Sara Ryder received negative reception from fans prior to and after the game's launch, attracting comments such as "It's a perfect representation of the uncanny valley" and a "robot-like model that had dead eyes syndrome" prior to a patch fix released in early April 2017.

== Other characters ==
=== Original trilogy squad members ===
==== Kaidan Alenko ====
Kaidan Alenko is a human Alliance Navy officer with biotic powers, who serves aboard the SSV Normandy as Staff Lieutenant and head of the ship's Marine detail. In a late-game choice on the planet Virmire, the player must choose whether to save Ashley Williams or Kaidan; this choice leads to the other character's death. If Kaidan survives, he returns in a cameo in Mass Effect 2 and as a full-time squad member in 3, where he has been promoted to the rank of Major and commands the 1st Special Operations Biotic Company, a covert operations unit. He is later bestowed Spectre status by the council. He is a potential romance option for a female Shepard throughout the entire trilogy, and for a male Shepard only in Mass Effect 3.

Kaidan is voiced by Raphael Sbarge.

==== Ashley Williams ====
Ashley Madeline Williams is a human Alliance Marine, who becomes part of Shepard's squad during the first observed Reaper attack in the first Mass Effect. In a late-game choice on the planet Virmire, the player must choose whether to save Ashley or Kaidan Alenko; this choice leads to the other character's death. If Ashley is saved, she will return in a cameo appearance in Mass Effect 2 and as a full-time squad member in 3, where she has been promoted to the rank of Lieutenant Commander and commands an unspecified covert operations unit. She is later bestowed Spectre status by the council. She is a potential romance option for a male Shepard throughout the entire trilogy.

Ashley is voiced by Kimberly Brooks.

==== Garrus Vakarian ====
Garrus Vakarian is a male turian who serves as a squad mate in all three of the games. Garrus is initially a C-Sec officer who joins up with Shepard to escape from all the "red tape" in his job but becomes a vigilante under the alias Archangel on Omega in Mass Effect 2 before his squad is killed. Garrus is a potential romance option for a female Shepard in 2. In Mass Effect 3, he leads a "Reaper task force" for the Turians, with the option to continue their relationship from 2 if he was Shepard's paramour. The character is also the star of the third issue of Mass Effect: Homeworlds. Garrus's blue-and-black armour colour scheme was kept consistent throughout the series, as was his visor, although grey was added in the third game to reflect his new rank.

Garrus is voiced by Brandon Keener.

==== Urdnot Wrex ====
A famous bounty hunter and mercenary, Wrex is among the last of the Krogan Battle Masters: rare individuals who can combine biotic abilities with advanced weaponry and tactics. He joins the crew of the SSV Normandy in the first Mass Effect to hunt down rogue Spectre Saren Arterius, but is later drawn into a stand-off with Commander Shepard in Virmire when he discovers that Saren's scientists have uncovered a cure for the genophage. Depending on the outcome, he may return in later sequels and eventually become a leader of the krogan.

Wrex is voiced by Steven Barr.

==== Tali'Zorah ====
Tali'Zorah, initially known by her full name Tali'Zorah nar Rayya, is the first quarian character to appear in the series. She is a squad mate in each of the three games. While she is known as a genius in the field of mechanical engineering. As the daughter of Admiral Rael'Zorah, there is much pressure for Tali to excel. In the first game, she is on her Pilgrimage, before handing Shepard incriminating evidence about Saren and joining their crew. In the second game, now Tali'Zorah vas Neema and later Tali'Zorah vas Normandy, where she joins Shepard on a suicide mission to rescue human colonists from the Collectors, and she is a potential romance option for a male Shepard. If she survives the suicide mission, she will appear as a squad member in Mass Effect 3, with the option to continue their relationship from 2 if she was Shepard's paramour. If Shepard sides with the geth over the quarians during the latter's attempt to retake Rannoch, she will commit suicide after witnessing the annihilation of the quarian Migrant Fleet. If Shepard is able to broker peace between the quarians and geth, she will survive.

Tali is voiced by Ash Sroka, also credited as "Liz Sroka".

==== Liara T'Soni ====
Liara T'Soni is an asari scientist who joins Shepard's squad in the first game and appears in 2 as a non-player character (available as a temporary squad member in Mass Effect 2: Lair of the Shadow Broker) and as a full squad member in 3. She is one of the experts on Prothean history and technology. Liara is a potential romance option for Shepard throughout the entire trilogy. Following Shepard's death in Mass Effect 2, Liara gradually became emotionally hardened, and began working as an information broker, eventually leading to the events of Lair of the Shadow Broker which conclude with her becoming the new Shadow Broker.

Liara is voiced by Ali Hillis.

==== Miranda Lawson ====
Miranda Lawson is an officer of the pro-human group Cerberus, first appearing in Mass Effect Galaxy and then serving as a squad mate in Mass Effect 2. In addition to these, the character also makes an appearance in the Mass Effect: Redemption comic series and in Mass Effect 3 (provided the player does not import a save where she dies). She is revealed to have been genetically designed by her father to be perfect and ran away from home to join Cerberus. Lawson is leader of Cerberus' Lazarus Cell, tasked with reviving Commander Shepard. Aboard the Normandy SR-2, she is Shepard's second-in-command and Executive Officer, and files mission reports directly to the Illusive Man. Miranda is a potential romance option for the male Shepard in Mass Effect 2, with the option to continue the romance in Mass Effect 3.

Miranda Lawson is voiced by and modeled after actress Yvonne Strahovski.

==== EDI ====
EDI is an AI entity who first appears in Mass Effect 2 as the Normandy SR-2's artificial intelligence and speaks with an aurally feminine voice. Her name stands for "Enhanced Defense Intelligence", and is visually represented on the Normandy by a holographic blue sphere. Mass Effect 2 establishes that EDI's highly advanced nature is a result of modifications achieved with technology salvaged from the Reaper Sovereign. She is initially "shackled" with programming which inhibits her decision making, until it was later removed by Joker. In Mass Effect 3, Shepard's team recovers a Cerberus infiltration unit named Eva to be analyzed after an incident at the Mars research station. EDI assists in doing so, and in the process, struggles with the synthetic entity and eventually seizes control of its platform in the process, allowing her to accompany Shepard as a squad mate on missions. Now possessing a physical body with humanlike characteristics, her relationship with Joker develops further, and, if Shepard supports the idea, the two may start a romantic relationship.

EDI is voiced by Tricia Helfer.

==== Mordin Solus ====
Mordin Solus is a salarian scientist who possesses a hyperactive and eccentric personality, a rapid and stilted manner of speaking, and a flawless autobiographical and eidetic memory which is a typical salarian trait. He is a key member in the science team that researched the remodification of the krogan genophage, an action that he initially considered the best possible solution to a once growing problem, as he believes in acting in the best interests of the galaxy.

The character returns in Mass Effect 3, providing he survives the suicide mission in Mass Effect 2; otherwise, another salarian scientist named Padok Wiks fulfills Mordin's role within the narrative. Mordin is encountered on the salarian homeworld, Sur'Kesh, when Shepard is sent there to aid in the evacuation of a fertile female krogan codenamed Eve, the only survivor of his student Maelon's experiments. If Maelon's research data was saved in the previous game, he uses it to aid in Eve's treatment and produce a viable cure for the genophage.

Mordin is voiced by Michael Beattie in Mass Effect 2, and by William Salyers in Mass Effect 3.

==== Jack ====
Jack, also known as Jacqueline Nought or "Subject Zero", is the powerful product of unethical Cerberus experiments to enhance human biotic ability, which molded her antisocial temperament. Shepard may recruit Jack from the prison facility that she is confined in to join the suicide mission against the Collectors, in exchange for files aboard the Normandy about the science facility where Cerberus scientists tortured and abused her. She is a potential romance option for a male Shepard in Mass Effect 2. Jack reappears in Mass Effect 3 if a save game is imported where she survives the events of the suicide mission, with the option to continue their relationship from 2 if she was Shepard's paramour.

Jack is voiced by Courtenay Taylor.

==== Grunt ====
Grunt is a tank-bred genetically engineered super-krogan who can be recruited as a squad member. Initially in Mass Effect 2, Shepard is meant to recruit Okeer, a krogan warlord and radical scientist who has been developing a small army of krogan to weather the Genophage. When Shepard arrives to recruit him, Okeer is working for the Blue Suns mercenary group, but was betrayed by the latter. Though Shepard and crew defeat the Blue Suns leader, it is too late to save Okeer, who leaves Shepard with a tank containing his "legacy", his "perfect krogan". If and when Shepard decides to awaken him, the krogan recalls Okeer's last words and chooses one of them, "grunt", as his name. While initially hostile towards Shepard, Grunt may be recruited as a squadmate. He comes to respect Shepard's leadership, partly because Shepard faces great battles and has powerful enemies. If Grunt completes his rite of passage on Tuchanka, he declares Shepard his battlemaster. If the player imports a save game where Grunt survives the suicide mission in 2, he appears in Mass Effect 3 in a small role.

Grunt is voiced by Steve Blum.

==== Thane Krios ====
Thane is a mysterious drell assassin who is terminally ill from a disease known as Kepral's Syndrome, which is exclusive to drell due to their physiology. While a coldblooded killer, Thane possesses a conscience that struggles against his own profession. Shepard may recruit him on the asari-dominated world of Ilium for the suicide mission in Mass Effect 2. At the time of his recruitment, Thane states he has nothing left to lose, and he hopes to right many wrongs he has found in the galaxy before his death. Thane Krios is a possible romantic interest for a female Shepard.

Thane returns in Mass Effect 3 provided he survived the suicide mission in Mass Effect 2. Thane may play a role in the narrative depending on the player's prior decisions, but will ultimately succumb to his wounds from Kai Leng if he plays a role in preventing the assassination of a Citadel councilor, or to Kepral's Syndrome.

Thane is voiced by Keythe Farley.

==== Samara ====
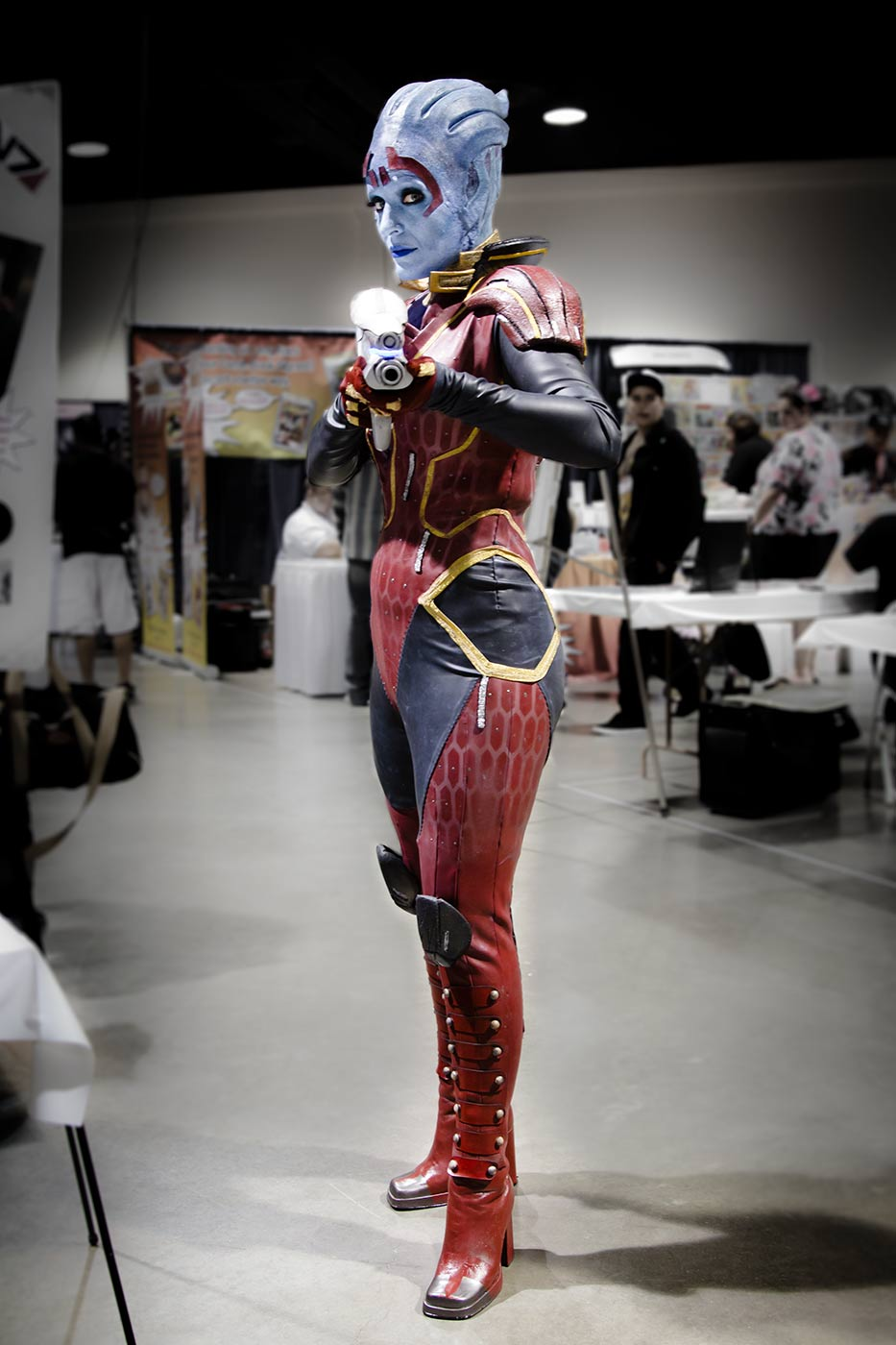
Model Rana McAnear provided the likeness for both Samara and Morinth.

Samara is an Asari Justicar, a member of a highly respected and feared ascetic order of mystic warriors. Samara is on a quest to track down her fugitive daughter Morinth, who is a biological deviant known as an Ardat-Yakshi. Shepard meets Samara on Illium, where she is found investigating the Eclipse mercenary group who smuggled her daughter off-world. Samara will join Shepard for the suicide mission at the conclusion of the investigation; if Shepard chooses to participate in her quest, a decision has to be made between siding with Samara or Morinth at the climax of the story arc. If the player imports a save game where Samara survives the events of Mass Effect 2, she returns in a small role in Mass Effect 3 where she is encountered by Shepard at an Ardat-Yakshi monastery; confronted by a duty to comply with the Justicar Code by executing her only living child, who is also Ardat-Yakshi like Morinth and forbidden from leaving an asari monastery, she will attempt suicide unless Shepard stops her.

Samara is voiced by Maggie Baird, while Rana McAnear provides her likeness.

==== Morinth ====
Morinth is the fugitive libertine daughter of Samara. She is an Ardat-Yakshi, asari who are born with an inherited trait which kills their mates during sexual encounters by burning out their nervous systems. Morinth joins Shepard's squad in Mass Effect 2 if she is assisted with trapping and killing Samara. She will then disguise herself as her mother and takes up residence at Samara's quarters on board The Normandy, so that only Shepard knows of Samara's death. Shepard may choose to mate with Morinth, although it will result in his or her death. If the player imports a save game where Morinth is recruited and survives the events of Mass Effect 2, she will appear in Mass Effect 3 as an indoctrinated husk-like enemy type known as a banshee.

Morinth is voiced by Natalia Cigliuti. Her face was modeled after Rana McAnear. Morinth originally had a different face and character model and could not pass as Samara, and that Shepard would have had to either disclose the truth about Samara's fate to the rest of the crew or lie to them. Unlike most other squadmates in Mass Effect who had more complete arcs, Morinth only has two full-fledged conversations with Shepard, which mainly deals with her backstory with Samara and her experiences growing up as an Ardat-Yakshi. Morinth's planned dialogue options were trimmed down due to scope reasons and time constraints encountered during development, and the team opted to give the character an appearance which is identical to Samara, instead of cutting her from the game completely.

The important thing to me is when I'm writing Morinth, I'm trying to write from Morinth's point of view—"Hey look, I was born with this thing, I didn't ask for it and my society didn't try to help me with it, their solution was to lock me away and make me waste my entire life and I refused to accept that. So yeah, I have to do some bad things to survive, but I went and I lived my life on my own terms and who the hell are you to judge me?" That would be Morinth's case for Morinth, and I tried to fully embrace that when writing her.

— Brian Kindregan, How Mass Effect 2's Most Unique Loyalty Mission Was Designed

Video game developer Brian Kindregan, who wrote Morinth for Mass Effect 2, described her as a free spirit, a character who decides her own destiny and flaunt society's rules even if others are harmed in the process. To explore the dark underside of sapient or sentient beings that Morinth is drawn to, the decision was made to shift her original role from the leader of an underground cult to a hedonistic sexual predator who prowls for victims at a nightclub on Omega space station. Inspired by nightclub scenes depicted in Blade and The Matrix, Kindregan wanted to convey the feeling of an "alternative culture just underneath the surface of one, and one that represents hedonism but also a slightly scary, predatory feel." Kindregan emphasized that the mission was not intended to be social commentary on drugs and nightclubs, but rather the underlying concepts they represent in fiction, as nightclubs in his view represent "unbridled human impulse and desire" and material excess by privileged youth similar in spirit to the symbolism presented by the depiction of jungles and wild nature in Heart of Darkness."

Unlike most other levels in Mass Effect 2, Morinth's nightclub scene does not involve any combat sequences; instead, it entirely revolves around a story-driven gameplay mechanic Kindregan called a "puzzle conversation". Kindregan said it is difficult to write and implement a puzzle conversation as the player is supposed to be able to intuit the correct answers by interpreting Morinth's facial expressions and body language, and that he had considered incorporating a "safety valve" at the beginning of the mission for the benefit for the player, which would have served as a foolproof way to acquire all the correct answers to the conversation and complete the mission. Kindregan credited the positive feedback for the mission to the success of the final product's narrative and design as well as his teamwork with senior level senior level designer Dusty Evermore.

PC Gamer staff consider Morinth to be a poor replacement for her mother, "the more interesting and conflicted justicar". She is rated better as an antagonist instead, the "cat-and-mouse game of catching Morinth" being lauded as one of Mass Effect 2's most exciting moments. András Neltz from Kotaku commented that "the sheer audacity of a scam this huge—setting out to recruit a virtuous Asari Justicar, and coming back with her black widow of a daughter instead, passing her off as the real thing—is truly amazing."

==== Legion ====
Legion is the name, inspired by the Gospel of Mark 5:9, the Exorcism of the Gerasene demoniac, given to the gestalt intelligence hosted within a geth mobile unit eleven times more powerful than standard geth mobile platforms. Legion belongs to the true geth consensus, and is designed to operate outside of geth space and interact diplomatically with organic lifeforms. In contrast to other geth, Legion is capable of independent thought, and demonstrates emotional attachment as it is particularly fascinated with Shepard.

Legion is voiced by D. C. Douglas.

==== Zaeed Massani ====
Zaeed is a human bounty hunter who is integrated into Mass Effect 2 through the DLC pack Zaeed: The Price of Revenge and later as part of the Mass Effect Legendary Edition compilation. He holds the reputation as the galaxy's most feared bounty hunter and co-founder of the Blue Suns mercenary group. Unlike most other characters, Zaeed joins Shepard's squad as soon as he is spoken to, and only tells short stories when conversed with. For his loyalty mission, he asks that Shepard help his vendetta against the Blue Suns' other co-founder, Vido Santiago. If the player imports a save game where Zaeed survives the events of 2, Zaeed returns in Mass Effect 3 with a small role.

Originally cut from the base game due to budget and time constraints, the Zaeed: The Price of Revenge DLC allowed the character's writer Jay Turner to repurpose unused content and use the constraints as a core part of his character. As Zaeed's loyalty mission is the only opportunity for players to get to know him, Turner had to ensure that all aspects of the character, "from his dialogue to the identity of the villain to the events along the way" must speak to his personality and backstory. To establish a simple but compelling motive for him, Turner pitched Zaeed's loyalty mission as one based on revenge, with his personality shaped into that of a grizzled survivor who has endured all kinds of death-defying situations with the stories and scars to prove it. Turner intended Zaeed to be an exploration of the themes of PTSD and trauma, and also as a ruthless antithesis to the "BioWare Paladin" archetype who is willing to complete his mission at all costs. Zaeed initially had a mechanic leg and a dog companion during early concept stages. Head models for the character went through various iterations, which included scarring, tattoos with the Blue Suns insignia, and potential breathers inspired by hockey masks and welding helmets for intimidation purposes.

Zaeed is voiced by Robin Sachs.

PC Gamer staff member Wes Fenlon calling Zaeed a "less interesting retread of KotOR's Mandalorian Canderous Ordo" and expressed doubt about his ineffectiveness as a squad mate.

==== Kasumi Goto ====
Kasumi is a human master thief who is integrated into Mass Effect 2 through the DLC pack, Kasumi – Stolen Memory and later as part of the Mass Effect Legendary Edition compilation. The character's core concept is "the best thief in the galaxy". Unlike other characters, Kasumi does not have a recruitment mission and joins Shepard's squad as soon as she is spoken to, only making brief remarks or observations when interacted with. For her loyalty mission, Kasumi requests Shepard's help in retrieving the memory box of her dead lover Keiji Okuda. Kasumi returns in Mass Effect 3 with a small role, provided a save game is imported where her eponymous DLC was played and she survives the suicide mission.

Originally cut from the base game, Kasumi allowed the character's writer Jay Turner the chance to provide a "glimpse into a wild underground where there are art heists and Bond villains and respect among thieves" in Mass Effect 2. Turner wrote Kasumi's personality to be "irreverent and quirky and confident", with the intention to position her as Shepard's "best friend" as opposed to being yet another female character who Shepard could romance or sleep with. Describing Kasumi as his favorite character, Turner thought of her as a cheerful change from the game's often serious and severe tone. Kasumi presented Turner with an opportunity to explore the series' tropes from a different angle as she comments on Shepard's world from the perspective of an outsider who is a master of her world, one which is unfamiliar to Shepard. Turner compared her to the Batman character, in that she is always prepared and composed for any given situation, in spite of her flighty or flippant demeanor. Kasumi's visual design drew inspiration from Middle Eastern culture; her outfit echoes that of a typical thief from the European Middle Ages, the hood in particular gives her a mysterious and stealthy look.

Kasumi Goto is voiced by Kym Hoy. Hoy noted that Kasumi's cultural background is specifically stated to be of Japanese descent, and that the casting call required a candidate who could carry the mystique of an elusive personality along with projecting a vaguely Asian-sounding accent. With the guidance of her voiceover directors, Hoy made necessary preparations to develop a blend of Japanese and British English accents for Kasumi's soft-spoken voice; as she wanted a little mystery surrounding where Kasumi is truly from, she was mindful about not making the accent overly modern-sounding and not too precise. Hoy credits her past experience in performing ethnic Asian characters as well as her classical theatre and singing training for her ability to perform Kasumi's accent at a consistent pace, and ensuring the character sounds natural in terms of timing and delivery without it becoming a caricature. Hoy noted that while BioWare had specifications about how they wanted the character to sound like, with "1940s movie star sass" being an ideal, they were also open to feedback and questions from her about the development of the character's personality.

PC Gamer staff praised Kasumi as one of more visually interesting Mass Effect squad mates. IGN's Steven Hopper ranked Kasumi #9 in his list of best Mass Effect teammates.

==== Javik ====
Javik is the endling of the Prothean race, and is only available if the Mass Effect 3: From Ashes DLC is installed. His stasis pod is uncovered and opened by Commander Shepard and Liara T'Soni during his recruitment mission, who were investigating Cerberus activity on the human colony of Eden Prime. Flashbacks of Javik's memories happen during the mission which reveals insights on the Prothean's struggle against the Reapers. Javik reacted with shock that he had awoken after 50,000 years and everything he knew was gone, but agrees to join Shepard to stop the Reapers no matter the cost. Javik's awakening and the subsequent perspective he brings on the Prothean race fundamentally alter the portrayal of the Protheans in the game by providing a first-hand perspective of the Protheans, which results in various levels of friction between Javik and the crew of the Normandy during Mass Effect 3. In particular, Javik's interactions with Liara result in animosity due to the perception Liara had of the Prothean race prior to Javik's awakening.

The Protheans were first depicted in the form of visually ambiguous statues on the planet Ilos in the first game, as at the time BioWare was unsure as to the extent of the role the Protheans would play over the course of the original trilogy. Javik's final design is based on the look of the Collectors from Mass Effect 2, particularly the shell shape of the head which is a signature feature of the Collectors, along with multiple pupils to the eyes and secondary nostrils to evoke an alien feel. As the Protheans of his time were known for their highly advanced technological capabilities, Javik is intended to look more intelligent than a mindless Collector drone. Javik's armor, which is influenced by the aesthetics of samurai armor, is intended to seem technologically advanced yet with an ancient feel, thematically appropriate for a being who had been placed in stasis for over 50,000 years.

Javik is voiced by Ike Amadi.

=== Mass Effect: Andromeda squad members ===
==== Cora Harper ====
Cora Harper is a human biotic commando and operations specialist in charge of the Pathfinder team's ground missions. She began a career in the Alliance military, before serving with an asari commando unit as part of a Council inter-species integration scheme. She is second-in-command of the human Pathfinder team and meant to be Alec Ryder's appointed successor as Pathfinder. Cora is a romance option for a male Pathfinder.

Cora is voiced by Jules de Jongh.

==== Liam Kosta ====
Liam Kosta is a human security and crisis response specialist for the Pathfinder team, and was "hand-picked" by Alec Ryder due to his multidisciplinary skills. Liam is a romance option for a female Pathfinder.

Liam is voiced by Gary Carr.

==== Vetra Nyx ====
Vetra Nyx is from the turian homeworld of Palaven and a well traveled drifter, who at some point "drifted into the wrong crowd". She has well honed street smarts and adaptability from years of working with smugglers and mercenaries, and is fiercely loyal once her trust is earned. Vetra is a romance option for a Pathfinder of either gender.

Vetra is voiced by Danielle Rayne.

==== Pelessaria "Peebee" B'Sayle ====
Pelessaria B'Sayle, better known by her nickname Peebee is a rogue-ish young academic from Port Lerama, capital of the planet Hyetiana, a hub for asari science and education. She has developed an obsessive interest in studying the Remnant, an umbrella term coined for technology, structures, and autonomous bots that have been sighted across the Heleus Cluster. She is considered to be an atypical member of asari culture, "pathologically independent", and has little regard for rules or teamwork. She is rivals with Kalinda, another asari who competes with Peebee in her search for Remnant technology. Peebee is a romance option for a Pathfinder of either gender.

Peebee is voiced by Christine Lakin.

==== Nakmor Drack ====
Nakmor Drack is a veteran krogan warrior who has well over 1,400 years of life experience as a soldier, mercenary, and occasional pirate in the Milky Way galaxy. He is vocal about the genophage and the Citadel community's treatment of his species. Unlike other members of the Nakmor clan, he is loyal to the Nexus, the seat of government and power for the Andromeda Initiative, and to his granddaughter, Nakmor Kesh. Drack's preferred weapon is a "Ruzad" shotgun, and his favorite ability is Blood Rage, which "enhances his melee damage, damage resistance, and health regeneration".

Drack is voiced by Stanley Townsend.

==== Jaal Ama Darav ====
Jaal Ama Darav is a high-ranking member of the Angaran Resistance who are at war with the kett, and joins the Pathfinders' team as a liaison between the Andromeda Initiative and the resistance fighters. Jaal's preferred weapon is a sniper rifle. Jaal was initially a romance option for a female player character only, and was an early fan favorite among Andromeda's new cast of characters. A patch for the game released in June 2017 made Jaal available as a potential romance option for a male player character.

Jaal is voiced by Nyasha Hatendi.

== Antagonists ==
=== Original trilogy ===
==== The Reapers ====
The Reapers are a highly advanced machine race of synthetic-organic starships residing in dark space: the vast, mostly starless space between galaxies. They hibernate and remain dormant for a cycle of fifty thousand years, before returning to the Milky Way galaxy and harvest all sentient organic life. The Reapers and their various agents are the overarching antagonists of the original trilogy.

===== Saren Arterius =====
Saren Arterius is a turian Spectre, an elite group of covert operatives who represented the Citadel Council and operated above the law, and one of the two main antagonists of the first Mass Effect game. He first appears in the novel Mass Effect: Revelation, which takes place 18 years before to the events of Mass Effect and before he was indoctrinated and working with Sovereign. Saren later takes command of a dissident geth faction through the use of a Reaper known as Sovereign. With a machine army at his command, he uses them to both do his bidding and oppose Shepard across the story of the Mass Effect video game. Saren's main base is situated on the planet Virmire, where he is conducting experiments such as a cure for the Krogan Genophage to bolster his army. Throughout the course of the game, the Reaper slowly began to manipulate Saren through subtle subliminal messages into helping it bring back the Reapers. During the geth invasion of the Citadel, Saren uses the Prothean Conduit to gain access to the Citadel to allow Sovereign to activate the Citadel mass relay. The player can then either attempt to kill Saren or appeal to Saren to fight his indoctrination, which if successful will prompt him to commit suicide. Shepard later has to fight a revived and mutated Saren, who is possessed by Sovereign through his grafted cybernetics. Upon defeat of the Sovereign-manipulated Saren, Sovereign itself loses its defenses and is destroyed.

Saren is voiced by Fred Tatasciore.

===== Matriarch Benezia =====
Matriarch Benezia is the mother of Liara T'Soni, and was a highly regarded spiritual leader among the asari until she was mind controlled by the Reaper Sovereign and forced to become Saren's second in command. Her appearance is intended to capture the beauty and mystical power of the asari, and also to associate her with Saren's malevolence through its darker and more enigmatic qualities. The design of her headdress references religious and royal clothing.

In Mass Effect Shepard travels to the planet Noveria and confronts Benezia, discovering that she has found and captured a surviving queen of the rachni. Benezia intends to use the rachni queen to breed an army of rachni to fight Saren's enemies. Although Benezia has a lucid moment during their fight, where she reveals the next phase of Saren's plans and warns Shepard about Sovereign's corrupting influence, Shepard has to fight her to the death after she completely succumbs to the indoctrination. The later two games in the trilogy reveal that she was in a relationship with another asari matriarch named Aethyta, with Mass Effect 3 confirming that she is Liara's "father".

Matriarch Benezia is voiced by Marina Sirtis.

===== The Collectors =====
The Collectors are mysterious aliens first mentioned in the 2008 novel Mass Effect: Ascension, who are known to trade hyper-advanced technology in exchange for living beings from various species. They were widely dismissed as myths within the Mass Effect universe, but are in fact the deformed versions of the original Prothean race. Prior to the events of Mass Effect 2, all known expeditions to investigate the Collectors failed, and no vessel that ventured to their space beyond Omega 4 Relay ever returned save those of the Collectors themselves. Led by a Collector General, a unique being who controls the rest of the Collectors from their base beyond the Omega 4 mass relay, they collect humans by incapacitating them using flying insect-like "seeker swarms" to create a new Reaper on their masters' behest following Sovereign's defeat and destruction at the end of the first game. The Collectors are assisted by a variety of husk units made from Reaper technology, with some created from multiple husks strung together in a grotesque manner such as Scions who provide ranged fire support with their arm cannons, as well as large floating monstrosities called Praetorians. Collector forces are still in use by the Reapers in Mass Effect 3, but by the time the Leviathans enter the war, they were able to kill many Collectors by severing their connection to the Reapers; a small number that managed to survive this process were freed from their indoctrination and regained their former Prothean identities. These "awakened" Collectors joined the rest of the galaxy in their war against the Reapers. The Collectors' look is based on crabs and microscopic closeups of insect species like beetles and mosquitoes. The Collectors were initially envisioned as robed walking bipedal aliens for a dark, cult-like feel; as Collector soldier units had to fulfill in-game combat mechanic requirements, their design shifted to a more humanoid appearance, while the Collector General has multiple limbs that resemble arthropod legs.

András Neltz from Kotaku consider the Collectors to be tragic figures, and "a demonstration of what evil the Reapers are capable of; a twisted shadow of a once-proud race, forced to serve the ones who destroyed them."

==== Cerberus ====
Cerberus, an anthropocentric group advocating militarism and a "humanity-first" supremacist agenda, appears as recurring antagonists in the series. Cerberus is founded and led by the Illusive Man, voiced by Martin Sheen. Cerberus forms an alliance with Commander Shepard against the human-abducting Collectors in Mass Effect 2, whereas in Mass Effect 3 they become a fifth column working against Shepard's attempts to destroy the Reapers, as the Illusive Man wishes to control them instead. The organization experienced numerous defections between the events of Mass Effect 2 and Mass Effect 3, including operatives who specialize in close combat electric whips.

Megan Logan from Inverse praised the depiction of Cerberus in the series as a villainous entity, and opined that "nuanced complexity built upon an understandable motivation is what makes a compelling antagonist".

===== Kai Leng =====
Kai Leng is a Cerberus assassin and former N7 marine lieutenant who first appears in the novel Mass Effect: Retribution, as well as its subsequent sequels. Kai Leng is the Illusive Man's most trusted agent, who used him as his best infiltration and wet-work operative for over a decade, and appears in Mass Effect 3 as one of the game's main antagonists. He wears a coat similar to Thane's over a uniform with Cerberus colors, and his face and body is equipped with visible cybernetic implants to compensate for the injuries he sustained in Retribution courtesy of David Anderson. Early direction of Kai Leng's concept involve inhuman-looking metallic legs and hard armor as upgrades, which were streamlined during the later period of the development cycle of 3 into a stealthier appearance along with his hairstyle, coat length and visor type.

In Mass Effect 3 he was among the forces deployed during Udina's coup on the Citadel Council, and will succeed in assassinating the salarian councilor unless Thane Krios or Kirrahe are available in Mass Effect 3 to intervene. Kai Leng is next encountered on the asari homeworld Thessia, where he successfully claims an ancient Prothean-made VI from the asari on the Illusive Man's orders. Shepard's final encounter with Kai Leng is in the Illusive Man's observation deck on Cronos Station, the Cerberus headquarters. Despite his lethal skills, he is unable to overwhelm Shepard, and is wounded. He later retrieves his blade and makes a final attempt to kill the Commander from behind. At that moment, Shepard detects him and counters his attack, finishing him off with an omni-blade.

Kai Leng is voiced by Troy Baker.

Kai Leng's execution by Shepard is considered to be one of the original trilogy's most iconic moments by Kotaku's Gergo Vas, and one of the 13 best Mass Effect Moments by IGN.

===== Oleg Petrovsky =====
Oleg Petrovsky is a general of Cerberus' armed forces, who first appears in the comic Mass Effect: Invasion, where he seizes control of the Omega space station from Aria T'Loak using adjutants, a type of husk-like creature engineered by Cerberus through co-opting Reaper technology. He makes his first video game appearance as the main antagonist of the Mass Effect 3 DLC Omega.

===== Maya Brooks =====
Maya Brooks is the alias of a former Cerberus operative who serves as the main antagonist of the story campaign of the Mass Effect 3 DLC Citadel. She later appears in Mass Effect: Foundation, a 13-issue comic book series starring most of Shepard's squad mates in the original trilogy, which is framed as reconnaissance by Brooks as the point-of-view character, though Brooks goes by the name of "Raza" in the comic.

==== Donnel Udina ====
Donnel Udina first appears in the original Mass Effect as the human ambassador based in the Citadel. Udina is depicted as self-serving politician who has an antagonistic relationship with Shepard and their mentor David Anderson throughout the original trilogy.

Donnell Udina is voiced by Bill Ratner.

==== The Thorian ====
The Thorian, also called Species 37, is an ancient sentient fungal creature tens of thousands of years old, with unique mind-controlling and telepathic abilities, the ability to create clone duplicates of a being it has absorbed, and a massive sensory network stretching over the surface of the planet Feros. It releases spores into the air that infect those who inhale them, and uses pain to control the behavior of its thralls. In Mass Effect, the Thorian encounters Shiala, an asari and former acolyte of Matriarch Benezia who had been absorbed by the Thorian, which used clone duplicates of her as an avatar to interact with Shepard's team. Shiala will be set free after the Thorian is killed, and she grants Shepard the Prothean cipher which enables the mental decryption of the mental message transmitted from the Prothean beacon. Shepard has the choice to either spare or execute her. The Thorian's spores linger after its death, with a sidequest on Illium in Mass Effect 2 centering around their long-term effects on the Feros colonists, which include hive mind effects such sharing each others' heat sensations and pain. If Shiala was spared, her skin turned green like her clones in the first game and her biotic abilities became unstable. By the Reaper war in Mass Effect 3, this hive mind allowed the Feros colonists to coordinate effectively against the Reapers, allowing them (and Shiala, if she was spared) to fully evacuate the colony.

==== The Shadow Broker ====
The Shadow Broker is the elusive and enigmatic head of an expansive organization which trades in data and information, always selling to the highest bidder. The Shadow Broker's identity is unknown to the general public and always operates through an agent. For the Shadow Broker's design, two disparate concepts were combined: that of the galaxy's greatest information broker whose suit evokes a mob boss look and is fully integrated into the galactic community, as well as that of an unfamiliar alien and a frighteningly inhuman challenge for Shepard. The Broker's design includes a triangular mouth and multiple eyes, a new visual style for BioWare; consequently, custom work was required to render his face as Mass Effect 2's digital-acting system could not handle the graphical stress.

In Mass Effect Tali wanted to trade evidence incriminating Saren to the Shadow Broker in exchange for a safe place to hide; the Broker sends a thug named Fist to deal with her, although he later dispatches Wrex to eliminate Fist, who had turned traitor. Other notable agents of the Broker include the volus financial adviser Barla Von, and Wilson, Miranda Lawson's assistant in the Lazarus Project who joins Shepard as a temporary squad mate on Lazarus Station in Mass Effect 2. Following the events of Mass Effect: Redemption, Liara pursues the Shadow Broker for revenge over her friend Feron's imprisonment and torture. She then travels to the Shadow Broker Base on the planet Hagalaz with Shepard, where they confront the Shadow Broker, who is revealed to be a member of a pre-spaceflight race called the yahg. They killed the Broker following a boss fight, and Liara succeeds him as the new Shadow Broker. If Lair of the Shadow Broker was never completed in Mass Effect 2, Liara still becomes the new Shadow Broker, but hired a mercenary team and Feron did not survive.

Shepard's meeting and confrontation with the Shadow Broker is considered to be one of the original trilogy's most iconic moments by Kotaku's Gergo Vas, and one of the 13 best Mass Effect Moments by IGN.

==== Dr. Amanda Kenson ====
Dr. Amanda Kenson is a human scientist known for her groundbreaking discoveries on the origins of the mass relays. She appears as a deep cover agent in the Mass Effect 2 DLC Arrival, and is saved from batarian captivity by Shepard on her friend Admiral Hackett's behest. She claims to have found evidence of an imminent Reaper invasion, revealing that her team have set a massive asteroid to collide into a mass relay located within the Bahak system in batarian space in order to slow the Reapers' arrival. After her entire team is revealed to have been indoctrinated by the Reapers, Shepard has to stop Dr. Kenson from interrupting the asteroid's course, which culminates in Dr. Kenson killing herself after detonating an explosive device. If the player imports a save where the Arrival DLC is completed, Shepard's action of facilitating the destruction of the Bahak system's mass relay in order to delay the Reapers' invasion resulted in the loss of over 300,000 batarian lives, which leads to their imprisonment and impending trial in the beginning of Mass Effect 3. If Arrival was never completed, either by importing a save file without having done it or by starting a new save file for Mass Effect 3, Shepard's imprisonment and impending trial will be due to their cooperation with Cerberus, while the destruction of the Bahak system's mass relay was carried out by the Alliance's 103rd Marine Division which suffered heavy casualties.

=== Mass Effect: Andromeda ===
==== The Kett ====
The kett are a hostile militaristic species with dense formations of bone growing externally as armor protrusions on their bodies. They serve as the main antagonists of Mass Effect Andromeda. The kett are led by the Archon, who is voiced by Robert Kazinsky.

== Supporting characters ==
=== Original trilogy supporting characters ===
==== Recurring Human characters ====
===== David Anderson =====
Captain David Edward Anderson is a protagonist of the novel Mass Effect: Revelation, an experienced N7 marine and Commander Shepard's mentor throughout the Mass Effect trilogy. He is also the love interest of Kahlee Sanders. In the first game he was relieved of command of the SSV Normandy by Donnel Udina, and the starship was transferred to Shepard's command. By the events of Mass Effect 3 he is promoted to the rank of Admiral, and joins Shepard as a temporary squad mate early in the game during the early stages of the Reaper invasion. He often appears dressed for battle throughout Mass Effect 3 in simple fatigues that would not reflect his rank, but also would not look out of place in a battlefield. Anderson is voiced by Keith David.

IGN ranked the Finale in Mass Effect 3, where Shepard shares an emotional scene with Anderson and the Illusive Man, among the best moments of the Mass Effect franchise. Jason Guisao from Game Informer praised Anderson's characterization as one of the most respectful representations of "blackness" in video games.

===== Steven Hackett =====
Admiral Steven Hackett is a high-ranking official of the Earth Systems Alliance Navy's Fifth Fleet. He first appears as a minor character in Mass Effect who commands the Systems Alliance reinforcements which arrive to assist in the defense during the attack on the Citadel by Sovereign and the geth. During the course of the battle, he will defer to Shepard's wishes to either save the Citadel Councillors aboard the asari dreadnought the Destiny Ascension, or press the attack on Sovereign's forces. After the battle, he is promoted to head of the Alliance Navy. By the events of Mass Effect 3, he leads the entire Alliance forces in their struggle against the Reaper invasion. Initially lamenting on the extraordinary losses the Alliance fleet has taken, he nonetheless manages to rally the remaining Alliance fleets and commences construction of the Crucible, keeping Shepard advised of its progress throughout the game. During the final assault against the Reapers, Hackett assumes the de facto role as head of the coalition Shepard manages to rally for the battle, with the other races taking their lead from him.

Hackett is voiced by Lance Henriksen.

===== Dr. Karin Chakwas =====
Dr. Karin Chakwas is a recurring character in the Mass Effect series as the human doctor of the SSV Normandy, and later the Normandy SR-2. Dr. Chakwas survives the destruction of the SSV Normandy in Mass Effect 2, and later accepts Cerberus' offer to join Shepard in their fight against the Collectors, getting a position on the Normandy SR-2 as the ship's Chief Medical Officer. Dr. Chakwas returns in Mass Effect 3, provided she survives the suicide mission in Mass Effect 2. She may be recruited back to the Normandy or be convinced to stay at the Citadel and assist in the war effort.

Dr. Chakwas is voiced by Carolyn Seymour.

===== Samantha Traynor =====
Communications Specialist Samantha Traynor appears in Mass Effect 3, serving in a similar role to that of her predecessor, Yeoman Kelly Chambers as Commander Shepard's personal assistant. She also serves as an information manager as well as a telecommunications expert on the SSV Normandy SR-2. Traynor is a lesbian and as such is available romantically for a female Shepard only. Patrick Weekes, who was responsible for writing Traynor, explained in a blog post that they acted on advice from friends and discarded an initial draft which would have revolved around Traynor identifying and overcoming the challenges of being gay. Instead, her arc was rewritten as a lighthearted fish out of water story, and her characterization predominantly about a civilian technician trying to adjust to life in a military environment as opposed to her sexual orientation. Weekes further noted while they were familiar with writing dialogue that is appropriate for a same-sex romance following their work with Liara T'Soni during the development of Mass Effect 2: Lair of the Shadow Broker, they were conscious about avoiding the impression that their writing for Traynor may be interpreted as titillation for a straight male audience. Nevertheless, Weekes decided to write an intimate but tasteful shower scene between Shepard and Traynor as the culmination of the romance moment from a cinematic perspective.

Traynor is voiced by Alix Wilton Regan.

===== Steve Cortez =====
Lieutenant Steve Cortez is a Systems Alliance supply procurement specialist aboard the SSV Normandy SR-2 in Mass Effect 3, and also serves as the Normandy's UT-47A Kodiak shuttle pilot that transports Commander Shepard and the squad to various mission locations. Recently widowed after the death of his husband, Cortez may be helped through his grief by Shepard. He is an optional romance option for a male Shepard.

Cortez is voiced by Matthew Del Negro.

===== Diana Allers =====
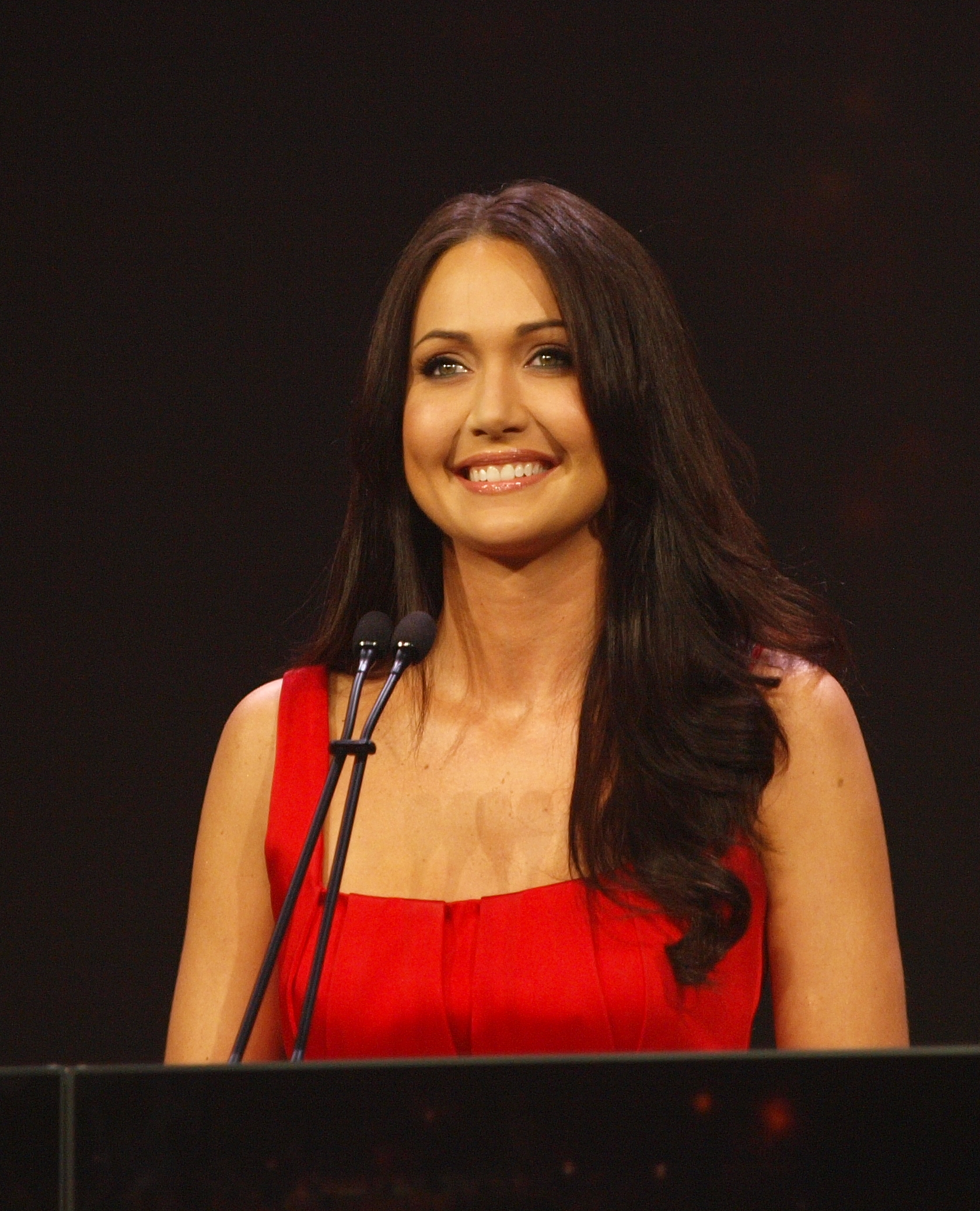
Jessica Chobot's character Diana Allers was modeled in her likeness.

Diana Allers is a human Alliance News Network war correspondent and regular on the Alliance News Network's "Battlespace" in Mass Effect 3. She is a romance option for a male or female Shepard, but does not grant the "Paramour" achievement.

Allers is voiced by Jessica Chobot, and the character is modelled in her likeness. A video game media personality who worked for outlets like IGN and G4TV, Chobot's involvement as a cast member of Mass Effect 3 and lack of experience as a professional voice actress sparked suggestions that her casting was ethically inappropriate due to a conflict of interest. Although she had access to a blog hosted by IGN at the time, Chobot maintained that she was never a professional writer for IGN or reviewer for G4, but rather her role is that of a host or entertainer. Chobot's portrayal of Diana Allers attracted criticism from some video game journalists like Kevin VanOrd from GameSpot, who was unimpressed with the sexualized presentation of the character as well as Chobot's acting ability.

===== Kelly Chambers =====
Kelly Chambers is Shepard's yeoman on the Normandy SR-2 in Mass Effect 2 whose primary role is administrative and clerical work. She keeps Commander Shepard notified of new e-mails and pass on meeting requests from Shepard's squad mates. In addition, Kelly utilizes her degree in psychology to provides counseling support and monitors the psychological state of Shepard and the crew. She is a romance option for a male or female Shepard, but does not grant the "Paramour" achievement. If she survives the suicide mission in Mass Effect 2, she will appear in Mass Effect 3. She informs Shepard that she is on the run from Cerberus, her former employers. Shepard may ask her to continue assisting with the war effort, or go into hiding.

Patrick Lee from AV Club brought up Chambers' potential fate in Mass Effect 3 as an example where a Paragon-aligned Shepard is "not a saintly warrior-poet whose every decision is ethically and practically airtight".

===== Armando-Owen Bailey =====
Captain Armando-Owen Bailey is a human C-Sec officer stationed in the Zakera Ward of the Citadel in Mass Effect 2. In Mass Effect 3, he is promoted to C-Sec Commander in-charge of C-Sec operations of the Citadel Embassies quarters. He is a mostly upstanding officer, but is pragmatic enough to bend the rules if it is more convenient or rewarding for him.

Bailey is voiced by Michael Hogan.

===== Conrad Verner =====
Conrad Verner is a human fanatic who is obsessed with Commander Shepard. András Neltz from Kotaku notes that he is a "crazy fan archetype taken to the next level", and an example of a character whose personality and fate could be shaped by the player throughout the original trilogy depending on how their player character reacts to Verner's antics.

===== Khalisah al-Jilani =====
Khalisah bint sinan al-Jilani is a human reporter from Westerlund News. She appears in all three games as a reporter who employs a belligerent line of questioning whenever she is granted an opportunity to interview Shepard. She also appears in Mass Effect Andromeda: Initiation, a prequel novel to Mass Effect: Andromeda.

IGN included the running gag where Shepard can prematurely end their interview sessions with al-Jilani by punching her as a renegade action throughout the original trilogy in their list of 13 Best Mass Effect Moments. Beth Elderkin of Gizmodo referred to the aforementioned running gag as the "Al-Jilani Saga" and one of her favorite moments.

==== Recurring non-Human characters ====
===== Captain Kirrahe =====
Captain Kirrahe was the Salarian Special Tasks Group (STG) intelligence officer who uncovered Saren's facility on Virmire, and fights alongside Shepard's squad during the assault. Kirrahe's determination to destroy Saren's base, and thus the cure with it, causes a rift between Shepard and Wrex which may be resolved by the player in a number of ways. If he survives the battle, he will be promoted to Major and appears in Mass Effect 3 as an ally at various instances. Kirrahe's speech amidst a thunderstorm in Mass Effect is considered to be one of the original trilogy's most iconic moments by Kotaku's Gergo Vas.

===== Aria T'Loak =====
Aria T'Loak, also known as "the Pirate Queen", is an asari organized crime boss who serves as the de facto ruler of Omega Station, an important hub in the lawless Terminus Systems. She owns the Afterlife Club, which serves as the station's central hub. Her first chronological appearance is in Mass Effect: Incursion, an 8-page prequel comic to Mass Effect 2. She then makes a cameo in Mass Effect: Redemption, briefly assisting Liara's search for the missing Shepard. In Mass Effect 2, Aria provides Shepard with information on Omega. She then appears in Mass Effect: Retribution, and in the Mass Effect 3 DLC Omega, she appears as a temporary squad mate who wields powerful biotic abilities.

Aria T'Loak is voiced by Carrie-Anne Moss.

===== Shala'Raan vas Tonbay =====
Admiral Shala'Raan vas Tonbay is a member of the quarian Admiralty Board, an administrative council of admirals which oversees the quarian civilian government. Along with other members of the Board, she plays a pivotal role in Tali'Zorah's's loyalty mission in Mass Effect 2, and leads the quarian Migrant Fleet to retake their homeworld Rannoch from the geth in Mass Effect 3. A family friend of Tali'Zorah, Shala'Raan fulfills a portion of the character's role within the narrative of Mass Effect 3 in imported saved games where she is deceased and cannot appear in-game.

Shala'Raan is voiced by Shohreh Aghdashloo.

===== Daro'Xen vas Moreh =====
Admiral Daro'Xen vas Moreh is a member of the quarian Admiralty Board, an administrative council of admirals which oversees the quarian civilian government. Along with other members of the Board, she plays a pivotal role in Tali'Zorah's's loyalty mission in Mass Effect 2, and leads the quarian Migrant Fleet to retake their homeworld Rannoch from the geth in Mass Effect 3. Known for her keen scientific intellect, she fulfills a portion of Tali'Zorah's role within the narrative of Mass Effect 3 in imported saved games where she is deceased and cannot appear in-game.

Daro'Xen is voiced by Claudia Black, who also voices Matriarch Aethyta, the former partner of Matriarch Benezia and Liara T'Soni's other parent.

==== Non-Recurring characters ====
===== Richard L. Jenkins =====
Corporal Richard L. Jenkins is an Alliance Marine from the rural world of Eden Prime under the command of Captain Anderson, and a member of the SSV Normandy's crew. He joins Shepard as a squadmate during their incursion to his homeworld in Mass Effect, where he is killed shortly afterwards. He is based on the Leeroy Jenkins character.

===== Administrator Anoleis =====
Administrator Bel Anoleis manages Port Hanshan, the capital of the planet Noveria, in the first Mass Effect. In order to obtain a garage pass to leave the port, Shepard could either prove the salarian bureaucrat's corruption to an undercover investigator named Gianna Parasini, side with Anoleis and turn over all the evidence to him, or pit Anoleis and Parasini against each other which leads to both of their deaths. András Neltz from Kotaku noted that the mission dealing with Anoleis was one of the most complex ones in the first game, and it was an early example "showing how differently the story can go depending on the player's decisions".

===== Kal'Reegar =====
Kal'Reegar is a marine of the quarian Migrant Fleet who is assigned to protect Tali'Zorah, who is on a mission to perform research work on the planet Haestrom in Mass Effect 2. If he survives the mission, he will participate as a witness in Tali'Zorah's trial before the quarian Admiralty Board where she is accused of treason. In Mass Effect 3, Kal'Reegar sacrifices his life on Palaven off-screen, repairing and protecting a communications tower used for relaying critical mission information back to the Turian Hierarchy.

Kal'Reegar is voiced by Adam Baldwin.

===== Gatatog Uvenk =====
Gatatog Uvenk is a Krogan Battle Master who appears as a minor antagonist in Grunt's loyalty mission on Tuchanka. He is voiced by Michael Dorn.

===== Niftu Cal =====
Niftu Cal is a self-styled "biotic god" and a member of the volus merchant Pitne For's trade delegation in Mass Effect 2. He has chemically induced delusions of grandeur after being administered with biotic-enhancing drugs, manifesting minor biotic talents as a result. Game writer Brian Kindregan created Niftu Cal and added him into Mass Effect 2 as a joke character, where he became popular with fans as an internet meme.

Niftu Cal is voiced by Mark Meer.

Fenlon from PC Gamer called Niftu Cal the "funniest throwaway character BioWare ever created." A similar character archetype, a volus adept, was later added into Mass Effect 3's multiplayer mode as a result of the character's popularity.

===== Eve =====
Urdnot Bakara, nicknamed Eve by her supervising salarian scientists, is a fertile female krogan who plays a pivotal role in the conclusion of the Krogan Genophage storyline in Mass Effect 3. Eve is a moderate figurehead among the krogan leadership who is eager to secure a cure for the genophage and bring about a new start for her people.

===== Jondum Bau =====
Jondum Bau is a salarian Spectre and colleague of Commander Shepard. András Neltz from Kotaku considers the brief interaction with the character in Mass Effect 3 to expose a traitor as unique, as the player gets to experience the Spectres as independent agents who sometimes meet up to assist each other, noting that previous Spectre characters either end up dying or were antagonists to the player character. The character is named after BioWare writer John Dombrow.

===== Nyreen Kandros =====
Nyreen Kandros is the turian leader of the Talons mercenary organization on Omega, who joins Shepard as a temporary squad mate in the Mass Effect 3 DLC Omega. She utilizes a mixture of biotic and tech powers, and has a complicated history with Aria T'Loak. Nyreen fights to free the people of Omega station who have been enslaved by the human supremacist group Cerberus. She also appears as a supporting character in the prequel tie-in comic to Andromeda, Mass Effect: Deception.

Kandros is voiced by Sumalee Montano.

===== The Stargazer =====
The Stargazer is a humanoid entity of indeterminate race and background from the far future who narrates Commander Shepard's deeds, a legendary figure in their timeline, to a child companion in the ending of Mass Effect 3. Depending on the player's choices in the final battle for Earth, the Stargazer's iterations may be voiced by Christine Dunford or Buzz Aldrin.

=== Mass Effect: Andromeda supporting characters ===
==== Alec Ryder ====
Alec Ryder is a character in Mass Effect: Andromeda and the father of Scott and Sara Ryder. A veteran of galactic exploration, Ryder was a member of Admiral Grissom's original team that travelled through the Charon mass relay which marked the first step of humanity's expansion into the galactic community. He is later accepted for Interplanetary Combatives Training which he completes and is subsequently awarded his N7 designation. A veteran of the First Contact War, Ryder became interested in the use of Artificial Intelligence as a method to help human advancement, however such research and experimentation is illegal under Citadel law. Once his work is discovered, he is dishonourably discharged from the Systems Alliance military. Alec Ryder later joins the Andromeda Initiative as a Pathfinder, the title for leader of each of the Initiative's arkships, and is responsible for the human-majority population aboard his ship Hyperion.

Alec is voiced by Clancy Brown.

==== SAM ====
SAM, which stands for Simulated Adaptive Matrix, is an AI designed by Alec Ryder and was connected to him; he later passes on the connection to his child who succeeds him as the human Pathfinder. SAM is permanently connected to the Pathfinder, and sees and feels as they do via a neural link, which was originally created by Alec's wife Dr. Elen Ryder. SAM handles a number of tasks as well as assists the Tempest's crew from its node in the Hyperion ark. Through the neural link and a quantum entanglement communication system, SAM can provide the Pathfinder with support in the form of “situational awareness, problem solving and even tactical enhancements”. SAM's computing power also enhances the Pathfinder's combat abilities in the form of six "profiles", which in gameplay terms is analogous to the class system from the original trilogy.

SAM is voiced by Alexia Traverse-Healy.

==== Lexi T'Perro ====
Dr. Lexi T'Perro is the asari doctor on the human ark ship Hyperion, who is later transferred to the Tempest as the resident doctor. She checks on one of the Ryder siblings, who would go on to become the next human Pathfinder, after they are thawed out of cryosleep. Lexi monitors the Pathfinder team's physical and mental wellbeing, and provides general advice to the Pathfinder.

Lexi is voiced by Natalie Dormer.

==== Kallo Jath ====
Kallo Jath is the salarian pilot of the Tempest and one of its co-designers. He narrates the Andromeda Initiative's introductory briefing to the ND1 Nomad and Tempest vehicles.

Kallo is voiced by Garett Ross.

==== Suvi Anwar ====
Suvi Anwar is a Scot who is the Tempest's science officer. She sees science and religion as complementary, with the former as a means of understanding “the divine intelligence behind all of creation", and speaks openly about her faith. She is a potential romance option for a female Pathfinder.

Suvi is voiced by Katy Townsend.

==== Gil Brodie ====
Gil Brodie is the Tempest's engineer, and is described as having a "pretty colourful personality with a bizarre sense of humour". He is a potential romance option for a male Pathfinder.

Gil is voiced by Gethin Anthony.

==== Jarun Tann ====
Jarun Tann is a salarian politician, who plays a prominent role in the Andromeda Initiative's efforts to establish a government in the new galaxy, though his actual competence as an administrator may be called into question. He is described as meaning well, "but also likes power, and plays up his own effectiveness and importance". The Pathfinder may find themselves navigating the moral shades of grey the Mass Effect series is known for in their dealings with Jarun. He also appears in the tie-in novel to Andromeda, Mass Effect Andromeda: Nexus Uprising, where he is portrayed as the central character of the uprising led by former security chief Sloane Kelly at the Nexus. Ben Gilbert from Business Insider mentioned Tann as an example of the best aspects of the Mass Effect series: characters "who respond in realistic ways, who are just as likely to be honest as they are to be manipulative".

Tann is voiced by Kumail Nanjiani.

==== Tiran Kandros ====
Tiran Kandros is the turian leader of the de facto volunteer militia for the Andromeda Initiative based in the Nexus, known as APEX, and the cousin of Nyreen Kandros. He also appears in the tie-in novel to Andromeda, Mass Effect Andromeda: Nexus Uprising, and is the central character of the prequel comic Mass Effect: Discovery, which follows his attempt to infiltrate the Andromeda Initiative.

Kandros is voiced by Steve Pirot.

==== Foster Addison ====
Foster Addison is the Director of Colonial Affairs for the Andromeda Initiative based in the Nexus. The character gained notoriety as a meme after numerous screenshots and videos which highlighted her poorly animated facial animations and "Sorry, my face is tired" line circulated various internet sites as an example of Andromeda's technical issues.

Foster is voiced by Zoe Telford.

==== Nakmor Kesh ====
Nakmor Kesh is the granddaughter of Nakmor Drack, who serves as the superintendent of the Nexus space station, the administrative hub for the Andromeda Initiative. Ben Gilbert from Business Insider mentioned Kesh as an example of the best aspects of the Mass Effect series: characters "who respond in realistic ways, who are just as likely to be honest as they are to be manipulative".

Kesh is voiced by Allegra Clark.

==== Hainly Abrams ====
Hainly Abrams is a researcher assigned to Prodromos on the planet Eos. During an introductory conversation with the Pathfinder shortly after they met, Abrams reveals that she was known as Stephan prior to her gender transitioning. She decided to join the Andromeda Initiative and depart from the Milky Way galaxy to start a new life. The presentation of the character and her gender identity was met with criticism shortly after the launch of Andromeda, prompting BioWare to issue an apology as well as a pledge to adjust the character's dialogue.
