= Illusive Man =

Fictional character from Mass Effect

The Illusive Man
- Mass Effect character
- The Illusive Man, as presented in Mass Effect 2.
- First appearance: Mass Effect: Ascension (2008)
- First game: Mass Effect 2 (2010)
- Voiced by: Martin Sheen

In-universe information
- Full name: Jack Harper
- Affiliation: Cerberus (Mass Effect 2, Mass Effect 3); The Reapers (Mass Effect 3)

The Illusive Man, real in-universe name Jack Harper, is a character in BioWare's Mass Effect franchise. Initially presented in the tie-in novel Mass Effect: Ascension, the Illusive Man makes his first video game appearance in Mass Effect 2, where he is depicted as the leader of Cerberus, an anthropocentric organization with the goal of advancing humanity's role in the galaxy. The character returns in Mass Effect 3, where he implants himself with a set of alien technology that ends up controlling him and making him aid the Reapers, the game's main antagonistic force. The Illusive Man is voiced by American actor Martin Sheen.

The Illusive Man was designed as a morally gray character with few signs of aging, a set of inhuman eyes, and a futuristic open suit designed to give an impression of authority. At one point in the development of Mass Effect 3, a Reaper-controlled Illusive Man was intended to become the game's final boss. His room was designed to show the Illusive Man's control of both his surroundings and a vast amount of information. Narrative-wise, the Illusive Man was designed to represent both the worst and best traits of humanity, with the narrative team making the deliberate decision not to reveal much about his present. In the Mass Effect universe, the Illusive Man is depicted as a "human nationalist" who only communicates with his subordinates via hologram. Aside from his initial appearance in Ascension, the character is also present in several Mass Effect comic series and novels.

The Illusive Man has been well-received, and his appearance in Mass Effect 2 has earned accolades, with IGN naming him best character of 2010. Martin Sheen's performance was received positively, earning a nomination for best male performance at the 2010 Spike Video Game Awards. He was particularly noted for his manipulative tendencies, influence, and secrecy within the series. His visual appearance in Mass Effect 3 and his relationship with the protagonist of the game, Commander Shepard, have been the subject of scholarly analysis.

== Concept and design ==
=== Visual design ===
In designing the Illusive Man, the Mass Effect 2 art team made the early decision to use a catalog model as a reference for his face. Even though the Illusive Man was conceived as a smoker and a hard drinker in his fifties, the art team decided that he would not show any signs of aging due to in-universe medical advancements.His bright blue eyes were created to make him look slightly inhuman, although a later in-universe explanation would be given in the comic series Mass Effect: Evolution. For his suit, the art team intended to design a garment that, while futuristic, did not ground itself in any particular decade's fashion and combined "an impeccable futuristic style" and "the casual swagger of a charming billionaire". It was decided that the Illusive Man's suit should be open, to give the impression he could do whatever he pleased. Producer Adrien Cho described the Illusive Man's final appearance as "almost perfect" and "very symmetrical".

During the early stages of development on Mass Effect 3, the Illusive Man was envisioned as the final boss fight of the game, which would see him being turned into a Reaper-controlled creature. This idea was ultimately rejected for various reasons, one being that the game design team wanted to give the players "the satisfaction of fighting a character they know", with his final depiction implying that the Illusive Man's biggest weapon was his intelligence and not his strength. In an interview with Eurogamer, producer Michael Gamble said the decision to discard the Illusive Man's boss fight was to make Mass Effect 3 separate from other games with similar endings. Several iterations of the Illusive Man's face were created to establish the level of indoctrination, a process in which the Reapers slowly influence an individual's mind until they are completely under their control, which the Illusive Man would be subject to. Some of those variations referenced the appearance of the main villain of the first Mass Effect video game, Saren Arterius.

For the Illusive Man's main setting, his chamber, the art team developed very few concept art pieces. This room was designed to be mostly empty to keep the Illusive Man's location unknown, with illustrations depicting the Illusive Man staring at a dying star to create the illusion that he was in control of his surroundings. The chamber was conceived to exclude any phones or monitors, instead having the Illusive Man surrounded by holograms meant to show his connection to a vast amount of information. Early concepts for this observation room in Mass Effect 3 featured the Sun visible in the background either in changing colors or in an eclipse. For its final look as presented in the game, the art team decided to make the dying star a hologram.

=== Narrative design and voice acting ===
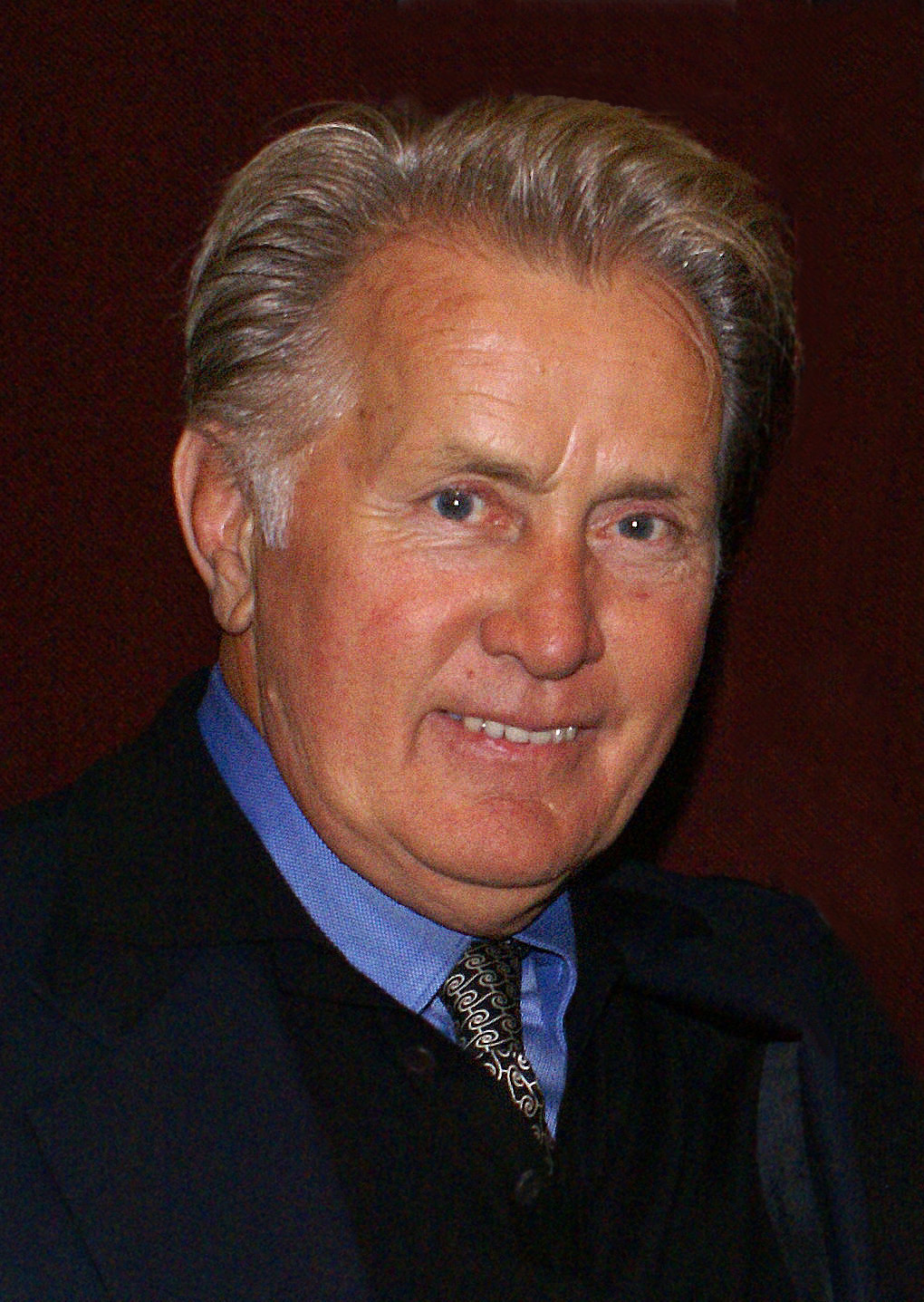
Martin Sheen provides the voice for the Illusive Man.

The Illusive Man's narrative creation was the result of a mash-up of several ideas. The name "Illusive" came from a proposed name for Dragon Age: Origins' Eclipse game engine, which at one point was meant to be called "Illusive". This name was inspired by the use of the word "elusive" in a phrase by Obi-Wan Kenobi in The Phantom Menace, but with the letter "E" swapped for an "I" to evoke "illusion". As a character, he was created by combining CNN reporter Anderson Cooper's ability to be at multiple places without looking tired with the idea of a character that represented the worst of humanity. Another major influence in his characterization came from Graem Bauer, Jack Bauer's brother in 24, a clandestine figure who worked behind the scenes. Mass Effect 3's lead writer Mac Walters explained that the Illusive Man was conceived as a morally gray character that the player would not know much about. Walters noted that the narrative team made the decision not to reveal much about the Illusive Man's present, but remained open to exploring his past through additional content. Producer Adrien Cho described the Illusive Man as "a shadowy puppet master", regarding him as "a womanizer" who encompassed both the best and worst traits of humanity embodied in a single individual, serving as a foil to Commander Shepard.

For his appearance in the comic series Mass Effect: Evolution, Walters stated the writing team wanted to explore the Illusive Man's identity and background, expressing special interest in how he came to hold the influence he holds in Mass Effect 2 and the justifications behind his ideology. John Jackson Miller, who penned the script for Mass Effect: Evolution, Invasion, and Redemption, personally viewed him as a searcher who saw a "darker side to some of the great things humanity's discovered".

For the Illusive Man's voice acting in both Mass Effect 2 and Mass Effect 3, BioWare cast American actor Martin Sheen. According to former Mass Effect lead producer Casey Hudson, Sheen was very invested in his role. Hudson further stated that during the recording, the development team had to explain to Sheen that he had to do multiple takes of each line so that they could fit in with the different conversation options that players have. The thought of someone talking back to the Illusive Man confounded Sheen, who stated that the player "wouldn't say that". In an interview with Joshua Lucht of Action News, Sheen said he would suck on a pen to simulate smoking when recording lines.

== Appearances ==
Throughout his appearances in the Mass Effect franchise, the Illusive Man is depicted as a "human nationalist" and the leader of Cerberus, an anthropocentric organization dedicated to advancing humanity's role in the galaxy. Originally introduced in the tie-in novel Mass Effect: Ascension, the Illusive Man almost never physically communicates with his subordinates, but rather via hologram in a separate chamber.

=== In Mass Effect video games ===
The Illusive Man makes his first in-game appearance at the start of Mass Effect 2, following Commander Shepard's death during an attack by an unknown ship. The Illusive Man orders Cerberus to recover Shepard's body and revive them. He debriefs Shepard about a series of mysterious abductions of human colonists, and instructs them to investigate the matter. He then tasks Shepard with building a team with whom to stop the abductions. As the game progresses, he sends Shepard on a series of missions that reveal that the Collectors, a mysterious and reclusive race of insect-like humanoids, are behind the abductions and the attack that killed Shepard. Nearing the game's conclusion, the Illusive Man sends Shepard to the Collector base in a "Suicide Mission", where Shepard fights a Reaper made with human DNA. Afterwards, the player must decide whether to hand over the base to the Illusive Man to assist his research or destroy it, ultimately severing their connection with Cerberus.

In Mass Effect 3, the Illusive Man becomes visibly deformed by Reaper nanotechnology.

The Illusive Man returns in Mass Effect 3, where he shows up at various points in the game, arguing that humanity should find a way to control the Reapers. Throughout the game, he is portrayed as a firm believer that technological augmentation is the key to human dominance, and actively seeks to use Reaper technology to elevate humanity. This leads him to conduct experiments with Reaper nanotechnology, implanting himself with it and becoming indoctrinated. Towards the game's conclusion, the Illusive Man discloses to the Reapers the galaxy's ongoing efforts to locate the Catalyst, the final component necessary to complete the Crucible, a large-scale anti-Reaper weapon. This allows the Reapers to take control of the Catalyst, which is revealed to be the Citadel, a space station and megastructure. During the final mission aboard the Citadel, the Illusive Man encounters Shepard as well as Admiral Anderson, who is fatally shot. The Illusive Man subsequently attempts to convince Shepard that the Crucible can be used to control the Reapers. Shepard can then either shoot the Illusive Man or convince him to shoot himself.

=== In other media ===
The Illusive Man features in several Mass Effect tie-in novels. He was first introduced in the already mentioned Mass Effect: Ascension, which follows his attempts to infiltrate the Ascension project, an ongoing human initiative to expand their capacity to use biotics, a form of telekinesis in the Mass Effect universe. The Illusive Man tasks his operative Paul Grayson with retrieving his adoptive daughter Gillian from the project so that Cerberus could personally train her, with Grayson ultimately betraying the Illusive Man to protect her. The Illusive Man returns in Mass Effect: Retribution, in which he orders the kidnapping of Grayson to perform experiments on him with the technology of the Reapers, causing Grayson to succumb to indoctrination, running rampant across the galaxy and prompting the Illusive Man to order his assassination. He also appears in Mass Effect: Deception, in which he orders the retrieval of Grayson's body and is targeted by a now adult Gillian.

The Illusive Man makes an appearance in multiple Mass Effect comics. His real in-universe name, Jack Harper, is revealed in the 2011 comic miniseries Mass Effect: Evolution, which explores an early encounter with Saren Arterius while Harper was fighting as a mercenary in the First Contact War, a background conflict between humanity and the Turians. Mass Effect: Invasion sees the Illusive Man involved in a conflict with the leader of Omega, a massive space station built in the crust of a metallic asteroid that makes an appearance in Mass Effect 2 and the Mass Effect 3: Omega downloadable content. In the fourth section of the comic series Mass Effect: Homeworlds, the Illusive Man contacts Liara T'Soni to exchange information on the Reapers. The Illusive Man also shows up in the tie-in comic Mass Effect: Foundation.

== Reception and analysis ==
=== Reception ===
The Illusive Man was received well, with accolades going for his appearance in Mass Effect 2. IGN named him the Best Character of 2010, calling him "[a]n enigma, a crusader, an agent of calm in a vortex of chaos". In Giant Bomb's Game of the Year 2010 Awards, the Illusive Man earned "Character We'd Most Like To Party With", with the site describing him as someone who prioritizes results over ethical considerations and commending his "singular vision" and "strong personality". The Illusive Man has been included in several "best video game villain" lists, receiving praise for his uniqueness when compared to other video game antagonists and his manipulative tendencies. Martin Sheen's performance garnered him a nomination for Best Male Performance at the 2010 Spike Video Game Awards. Seth Schiesel from the New York Times singled out Sheen's portrayal as an example of BioWare's superbly evocative and believable voice acting and direction, alluding to the perceived similarities between the Illusive Man and Sheen's character Captain Benjamin L. Willard from the film Apocalypse Now as "a wonderful, delicious riff". Andy Burt of GamePro also complimented it, declaring that Sheen "could've sleepwalked through the role [...] and many players wouldn't have noticed".

The Illusive Man drew favorable attention for his influence and secrecy. Andy Burt of GamePro contended that his "business-like mannerisms" set him apart from other characters in the Mass Effect series. Burt reflected on the Illusive Man's sinister nature when presenting himself as an ally, comparing him to "a mastermind right out of a James Bond flick" and adding how the player gets the sense that he is "manipulating all the events" while directing Commander Shepard. In a magazine published in 2010, Game Informer Staff named the Illusive Man one of the "30 characters who defined a decade". They explained that, even if he did not possess the same physical abilities as Shepard, the Illusive Man's influence and control over a great number of resources made him just as dangerous and "a very intriguing character". They viewed the Illusive Man's mysterious nature and moral ambiguity positively, observing how he was always "one step ahead" of Shepard, making him an unpredictable and ambitious figure who had attempted to turn the galaxy's greatest hero into a puppet. When discussing earlier works that may have inspired the Mass Effect series, IGN's Christopher Monfette compared the character to the Smoking Man from The X-Files.

His role as an antagonist has also attracted coverage, with praise going for his complexity and design. Megan Logan of Inverse commented on the Illusive Man's role as the leader of Cerberus, arguing that the idea behind his creation of the organization was not "inherently evil", noting that it was its execution that was flawed. Logan concluded that the perceived complexity in whether the Illusive Man was malevolent or simply blinded by his desire to advance humanity made him a "compelling antagonist". Paz Boris, writing for IGN Spain, regarded the Illusive Man as the franchise's best developed antagonist, pointing to how the writers had the Illusive Man aid Shepard throughout the games while not showing his true intentions until the very end. Boris further approved the decision to not have the Illusive Man as a boss battle in Mass Effect 3, as that would have undervalued his depth and already established attributes.

In an article written for The Escapist, Elijah Beahm considered his backstory as Jack Harper in Mass Effect: Evolution positively, suggesting that the comic captures the Illusive Man's most iconic traits. Beahm described the Illusive Man as one of the few characters truly central to "the Mass Effect mythos".

In April 2016, a fan-made YouTube video supporting Donald Trump's 2016 presidential campaign that appropriated audio from Mass Effect 2, including the Illusive Man's voice, was liked and shared on Trump's Twitter and Instagram accounts. The video, which resembled a promotional trailer, was removed shortly afterwards when publisher Electronic Arts filed a copyright claim, stating that it was unauthorized use of their IP.

=== Analysis ===
The Illusive Man's use of Reaper nanotechnology has been the subject of scholarly analysis. Sarah Stang discussed how the Illusive Man's technological augmentations affected his physical appearance and acted as a visual indicator of "ruthlessness and evil", similarly to how Shepard's physical appearance changes when making morally evil decisions. Stang labeled the color change in his skin as "cyborgian skin disease", maintaining that Mass Effect 3 ties morality to how "normal" a character looks. Stephanie Farnsworth pondered the Illusive Man's usage of Reaper augmentations on members of his political organization, arguing that by turning his subordinates into husks, a Reaper-controlled cyborg in the Mass Effect series, he leaves them without an opportunity to turn against him. Farnsworth further commented on the Illusive Man's indoctrination later in the game, pointing out how it reflected elements of a biopunk narrative.

Craig Hayden contended that the confrontation between Shepard and the Illusive Man in Mass Effect 3 represents two competing political models in tension: Shepard's inclusive, alien coalition-based approach against the Illusive Man's human-only exclusionary approach. Hayden continued that this conflict touched on the general themes of the Mass Effect series, raising questions about whether "the boundary conditions of identity are essential, necessary, or contingent".
