= Mass Effect: Ascension =

2008 book by Drew Karpyshyn

- Original cover of Mass Effect: Ascension
- Author: Drew Karpyshyn
- Language: English
- Series: Mass Effect
- Genre: Science fiction
- Publisher: Del Rey Books
- Publication date: July 29, 2008
- Publication place: Canada
- Media type: Print (Paperback)
- Pages: 342
- ISBN: 978-0-345-49852-6
- OCLC: 181599906
- Preceded by: Mass Effect: Revelation
- Followed by: Mass Effect: Retribution

Mass Effect: Ascension is a science fiction novel by author Drew Karpyshyn. It is a sequel to the video game Mass Effect, as well as to its prequel novel, Mass Effect: Revelation, also written by Karpyshyn. The novel is set approximately two months after the ending events of the first game. While the first book acted as a prequel to the first game, Ascension helps to bridge the gap between the first game and Mass Effect 2.

== Plot ==
The novel takes place shortly after the attack on the Citadel by the Reaper Sovereign and its allies Saren Arterius and the geth. The Ascension Project is an initiative program aimed at developing biotic abilities in humans, with a particular focus on the children of the victims of element zero accidents in multiple human colonies across the Systems Alliance. The Project, set up around 2176, is based at the Jon Grissom Academy, a medium-sized space station in orbit around the human colony of Elysium in the Skyllian Verge, a largely undeveloped patch of space situated along the borders of the Systems Alliance and the lawless Terminus Systems.

The Illusive Man, the enigmatic leader of the rogue, anthropocentric organization called Cerberus, plots Cerberus' next move, which involves the pursuit of an autistic young biotic prodigy named Gillian Grayson. Gillian's father and one of the Illusive Man's long-serving agents, Paul Grayson, is a troubled drug addict who was assigned with raising an infant girl with immense biotic potential. The autistic girl is now a member of the Ascension Project. Grayson, despite having much affection for his adopted daughter, is now reduced to a link man between Cerberus and their mole inside the Ascension Project, Dr. Jiro Toshiwa. Their mission is to sabotage the Ascension project by administering biotic-enhancing drugs to Gillian and evaluate their efficacy. When the Cerberus plot is exposed, Paul takes Gillian away from the Ascension Project and flees into the Terminus Systems. They are aided by Kahlee Sanders, a returning character from Revelation who is determined to protect Gillian, unaware that Paul is in fact a Cerberus operative. Their predicament is complicated when they cross paths with the quarian Migrant Fleet. Eventually Paul Grayson has a change of heart and leaves Cerberus, Kahlee returns to Grissom Academy, and Gillian remains with the quarian Migrant fleet.

== Reception ==
Rick Dakan from Pop Matters called Ascension a "solid action/adventure thriller that's a pleasant page turner". He noted that the novel marked the first appearance of the Illusive Man as well as the first mention of the Collectors in the Mass Effect series. Dakan noted that he has only read a few video game novels, but he liked that the author Drew Karpyshyn was also a designer for the Mass Effect series, noting that "it signaled to me that the book's events were likely to be fully integrated into the canon of the games". Matt Wadleigh praised Karpyshyn as a good story-teller and that "his love and curiosity for the universe that he’s helped build shine through on every page", though he feels that the book is over-written and would have benefited from more editorial oversight. He felt "a legitimate connection to the characters and support for their fight" by the time he finished the novel, and recommends it for fans who are interested in further exploring the motives of the Illusive Man, who Commander Shepard works with as an unwilling operative of Cerberus in Mass Effect 2. Brendan Lowry from Windows Central praised Ascension, commenting that the novel gives insight into the lives of the quarian people. He noted that there's a lot of information to be learned about the quarians, which supplements and clarifies the lore and history provided by Tali'Zorah to Commander Shepard in the first Mass Effect, as well as further insight into Cerberus and their schemes, "effectively serving as a prelude to Mass Effect 2".

== See also ==
- List of novels based on video games
