= Mass Effect: Retribution =

Book by Drew Karpyshyn

- Original cover of Mass Effect: Retribution
- Author: Drew Karpyshyn
- Language: English
- Series: Mass Effect
- Genre: Science fiction
- Publisher: Del Rey Books
- Publication date: 27 July 2010
- Publication place: Canada
- Media type: Print (Paperback)
- Pages: 356
- ISBN: 978-0-345-52072-2
- Preceded by: Mass Effect: Ascension
- Followed by: Mass Effect: Deception

Mass Effect: Retribution is a science fiction novel by Canadian writer Drew Karpyshyn set in the Mass Effect universe. It is a sequel to the video game Mass Effect 2, as well as to its prequel novel, Mass Effect: Ascension, also written by Karpyshyn. Retribution is set directly after the events of Mass Effect 2, and like its predecessors, expands on the Mass Effect universe by fleshing out its setting and providing background on some key characters.

== Plot ==
A few months after the events of Mass Effect 2, The Illusive Man, leader of the anthrocentric Cerberus, has managed to salvage the remains of the Collector Base beyond the Omega Four mass relay for the technology of the Reapers, a race of highly advanced sentient starships seeking to harvest organic life from across galactic civilization. Retribution follows Paul Grayson, a former operative of the Illusive Man who defected from Cerberus, as he attempts to learn the secrets of the Reapers. After Grayson goes missing, Grissom Academy staff member Kahlee Sanders calls upon her old friend David Anderson, one of the protagonists of Mass Effect Revelation and a supporting character in the first Mass Effect game, to help her find him. Kai Leng, a major antagonist in Mass Effect 3, makes his first appearance in Retribution.

== Reception ==
Calvin Kemph from Thunderbolt Games opined that he would not recommend Retribution as a standalone read, noting that as an installment in a fiction series, "it should be approached in sequential order and be used to supplement the fiction established in the source material, rather than serving as a replacement for it." He observed that Karpyshyn's writing strayed far enough from the narratives of Mass Effect and Mass Effect 2 that "he’s able to cleverly avoid spoiling most of the major plot-points". He concluded that Retribution is "pretty good for fiction adapted from a popular videogame" and that the novel is worth "a quick, fun read with a distinctive balance of meaningful exposition and action". Brendan Lowry from Windows Central called Retribution interesting and well-written, and that "it gives a strong perspective on the effects of Reaper indoctrination on living minds". He praised the inclusion of Kahlee Sanders and David Anderson into its narrative, noting that "it helps make this universe feel connected".

In his article from July 2010, Joe Juba from Game Informer outlined five reasons why Retribution is worth reading for fans of the Mass Effect series, noting that "this book seems to have a greater connection to the games than its predecessors". VentureBeat praised Karpyshyn's strong writing in Retribution, particularly the way he described "awfully well the horrifying feeling of Grayson being relegated to the back-seat of his own body", as a result of the Reapers bending him to their will through the cybernetic implants in his body. VentureBeat noted that while "a book critic might not find Karpyshyn's work to be ranked among the classics in literature", he very competently draws readers into the wider Mass Effect universe set up the first game.

== See also ==
- List of novels based on video games
