= Mass Effect: Redemption =

Comic book series

- #1 cover art by Daryl Mandryk

Publication information
- Publisher: Dark Horse Comics
- Schedule: Irregular
- Format: Limited series
- Genre: Science fiction
- Publication date: January – April 2010
- No. of issues: 4

Creative team
- Written by: Mac Walters; John Jackson Miller
- Artist(s): Omar Francia; Daryl Mandryk (covers)
- Colorist: Michael Atiyeh

Collected editions
- Hardcover: ISBN 978-1-59582-481-3

Mass Effect: Redemption is a four-part comic book mini-series. Set in the Mass Effect universe, Redemption takes place two years before the events of the video game Mass Effect 2.

== Publication history ==
=== Print editions ===
Mass Effect: Redemption was revealed on 21 July 2009. It will be a four-issue mini-series based on the Mass Effect video games. The comic will be published by Dark Horse Comics and is written by Mac Walters, who was a lead writer for Mass Effect, with scripting by John Jackson Miller and art by Omar Francia, both of whom have previously worked on Star Wars related comics.

Issue	Date	Pages	Creators
1	6 January 2010	32	Writers: Mac Walters, John Jackson Miller; Artist: Omar Francia; Colorist: Michael Atiyeh; Cover Artist: Daryl Mandryk
2	3 February 2010	32	Writers: Mac Walters, John Jackson Miller; Artist: Omar Francia; Colorist: Michael Atiyeh; Cover Artist: Daryl Mandryk
3	3 March 2010	32	Writers: Mac Walters, John Jackson Miller; Artist: Omar Francia; Colorist: Michael Atiyeh; Cover Artist: Daryl Mandryk
4	7 April 2010	32	Writers: Mac Walters, John Jackson Miller; Artist: Omar Francia; Colorist: Michael Atiyeh; Cover Artist: Daryl Mandryk

=== Digital editions ===
All four print issues were released digitally on 20 April 2011.

== Plot ==
The events of Mass Effect: Redemption tie in to downloadable content that was produced for Mass Effect 2 titled "Lair of the Shadow Broker". According to Mac Walters, the comic mini-series will be "expanding on characters that we didn't really explore in [the first] Mass Effect and also looking at opportunities to expand on them even further in the DLC".

The narrative in Redemption begins with Commander Shepard mysteriously disappearing in the Terminus Systems, out of contact with the SSV Normandy and its crew. In the Afterlife Club on Omega, Liara is speaking with an elcor patron about Shepard's whereabouts, only to be rebuffed in an abrupt manner. The two are commenting on a news broadcast that reports the Citadel is still under reconstruction when they are interrupted by a mysterious hooded figure, who is revealed to be a drell. Liara recognises him as her contact, and asks for information on Shepard. The drell agrees to inform her, but only once they are outside. The drell, known as Feron, informs Liara that Shepard is dead. Liara is devastated and asks Feron to see the body when they are attacked by Blue Sun mercenaries. The Blue Sun mercenaries are attacked by Cerberus operatives and Liara and Feron manage to escape only to be captured by Cerberus, where they meet Miranda Lawson. Liara meets with the Illusive Man to discuss Cerberus's motives; Shepard represents humanity and Cerberus wants the body back in human hands. The Collectors have hired the Shadow Broker who in turn, hired the Blue Sun mercenaries to retrieve Shepard's body as well. The Illusive Man tasks Liara to find out precisely why the Collectors want Shepard's body. Liara agrees, but for Shepard, not Cerberus.

Both the Shadow Broker (working for the Collectors) and Liara T'Soni (helping Cerberus) are to find and retrieve the dead body of Commander Shepard. Just as Tazzik, an agent of the Shadow Broker wants to turn over the corpse to the Collectors, Liara manages to capture it, with the help of the drell Feron, who is captured in the process, and turn it over to Cerberus, hoping that they may be able to revive Shepard.

== Reception ==
The comic received generally positive reviews. Game Informer's Andrew Reiner heavily praised the first issue, favouring the pacing over that of the first game but still enjoying the character and universe development. Although he felt Liara was likeable, he believed the Illusive Man and the Collectors "[stole] the spotlight". Jesse Schedeen, of IGN, gave the first issue an 8 out of 10, praising the supporting cast and the script; however, Schedeen felt Francia's art did not quite reach Mass Effect's aesthetic and did not offer a "complete visual package". Miguel Perez reviewed the future issues for IGN and was less positive: the second scored a 7.9, the third a 6.5, and the fourth and final a 6.2.

Matt Miller of Game Informer would go on to list the comic as one of "seven great video game comics", together with Evolution, though he called the ending "unsatisfying". Miller praised the involvement of Mass Effect 2 lead writer Mac Walters; IGN's Schedeen and Rich George echoed the praise for including the lead writer, compared to other video game comics. Paul Furfari of UGO listed Redemption as "required reading" for Mass Effect 2, calling it "more than essential" for lore fans and completionists.
