= Reapers (Mass Effect) =

Antagonists in the Mass Effect trilogy

- Mass Effect race
- 3D model of a Reaper Destroyer, as presented in The Art of the Mass Effect Universe (2012)
- First appearance: Mass Effect (2007)
- Last appearance: Mass Effect 3 (2012)
- Created by: Drew Karpyshyn

In-universe information
- Created by: The Catalyst
- Leader: Harbinger

The Reapers are a fictional fleet of sentient starships that serve as the main antagonists of the Mass Effect trilogy. The design of the Reapers was inspired by H. P. Lovecraft's Cthulhu Mythos deities. Within the series, the Reapers are cosmic horrors that cause galactic-level mass extinctions every fifty-thousand years. The Reapers have never once needed to "defeat" a civilization that they could persuade to surrender itself; they and their technology are capable of brainwashing organic life, and true synthetics subverted through digital means, through a mind control process called indoctrination. The Reapers employ servants who are often altered into synthetic-organic life forms. The Citadel at the heart of the relay system is a massive trap set by the Reapers; they guide rising civilizations along the same technological paths and encourage them to set up a central government on the Citadel itself. All this makes it much easier for the Reapers to harvest the galaxy, because everyone is dependent on the relays that they control.

Notable Reapers include Sovereign, first mentioned in the 2007 novel Mass Effect: Revelation, and Harbinger, a major antagonist of Mass Effect 2, and leader of the Reaper invasion on Earth in Mass Effect 3. Sovereign and Harbinger are voiced by Peter Jessop and Keith Szarabajka, respectively.

The Reapers were generally well received by critics, and regularly feature on lists of the greatest video game antagonists.

== Background ==
The Reapers are colossal entities which reside in dark space, the vast, mostly starless space between galaxies, where they hibernate and remain dormant for recurring cycles of fifty thousand years. As part of their perpetual plan for the galaxy's organic species, the Reapers set up the Citadel and created the docile Keepers as its caretakers; it is in fact a giant mass relay, the mass transit devices used by starships to traverse the galaxy in the Mass Effect universe. The Reapers allow organic life to develop, with the Citadel serving its purpose as a hub for the intergalactic species of the Milky Way galaxy, until they are ready to harvest it. Upon invading through the Citadel at the conclusion of every extinction cycle, the Reapers quickly deliver a decapitation strike to the major population centers and leaders of organic civilizations, crippling their ability to react. The Reapers then isolate each star system by controlling the galaxy wide mass relay network and engaging a war of attrition with the remnants of galactic civilization, hunting down any survivors via records kept at the Citadel. In dialogue with Commander Shepard, Sovereign states that they do not refer to themselves by the term "Reapers", but rather it is a name given to them by the Protheans, who lived in the cycle immediately preceding the current one.

Mass Effect 3's Leviathan DLC reveal that the Reapers' origins began more than one billion years before the events of the Mass Effect series, when the Milky Way galaxy was controlled by a species called the Leviathans. Observing a repeating cycle in which their contemporary civilizations would collapse after creating synthetic lifeforms that turn on their creators, the Leviathans seek to break this cycle by, ironically, creating a synthetic intelligence called the Catalyst. The Catalyst was intended to bridge the differences between organic and artificial life, and to preserve organic species at any cost. The Catalyst eventually came to a conclusion that conflict is inevitable, and decided to achieve this by harvesting organic civilizations at their peak, shortly before they are responsible for their own downfalls, and absorbing their genetic material into new lifeforms that it can maintain and preserve forever. The Catalyst begins with its own creators, the Leviathans, transforming them into the first Reapers and beginning the war its creators had tried to avoid.

Much like the Leviathans, each Reaper possesses some kind of mechanism which enables them to subtly influence: synthetics can be forcefully subsumed by a galaxy-wide "Reaper code" broadcast, and the minds of any organic individual within range through a mind control process known as indoctrination, gradually rendering them incapable of independent thought.

== Development ==
"We had other influences in our game besides classic science fiction. We wanted to distinguish the Reapers from things like the Borg or other similar stuff. What we did was, we went to the elder gods of the Lovecraft mythology. That’s what we wanted to capture. These are the science fiction version of the elder gods."

— Drew Karpyshyn, "Here's Why Mass Effect's Villains Were So Excellent".

The concept of the Reapers was influenced by the works of H. P. Lovecraft, specifically the Great Old Ones. The Reaper's true origins as depicted in the Leviathan DLC inform their overarching design, with the implication that they are thinking creatures which have adopted patterns of living, organic beings as part of their construction. Lead writer of the first two games of the trilogy, Drew Karpyshyn, explained that within the series, the Reapers are intended to have both the roles of creator and destroyer at the same time, an idea that explores what a deity might be within a hard science universe like Mass Effect. He remarked that Sovereign not only hinted that the Reapers are an unstoppable force during the Virmire conversation, but they also essentially create life in the Mass Effect universe, and are aware that the only way to control organic life is to direct its outcome. As the Bioware team was influenced by the Star Control series, the Reapers' art direction resembles that of the Ur-Quan Kohr-Ah from Star Control II, while their sentience-harvesting goals resemble the central conflict of Star Control 3. Chris Ullery from PikiGeek also claimed that the Reapers have been inspired by the Ur-Quan of the Star Control video game series, to the point that "Sovereign's words—and voice—echo those of the Ur-Quan almost line for line".

The interior of a Reaper is depicted in one level in Mass Effect 2 that takes place within a derelict Reaper which had been disabled by a mass accelerator weapon millions of years prior. In this level, Commander Shepard has been tasked with investigating the loss of contact with Cerberus scientists analyzing the Reaper's remains, which is adrift in space. The design team considered the context of the level's backstory to be an opportunity to solve a design issue of walking within a creature that is not built for that purpose, as they reasoned that the Cerberus team would have built platforms for ease of navigation. Given the assumption that Reapers are a machine species that would have a sense of logic to their internal layout, the team also concepted drawings showing massive holes which have been blasted and melted into parts of the hull and remain unrepaired, to help decide how alien to make the Reaper's interior.

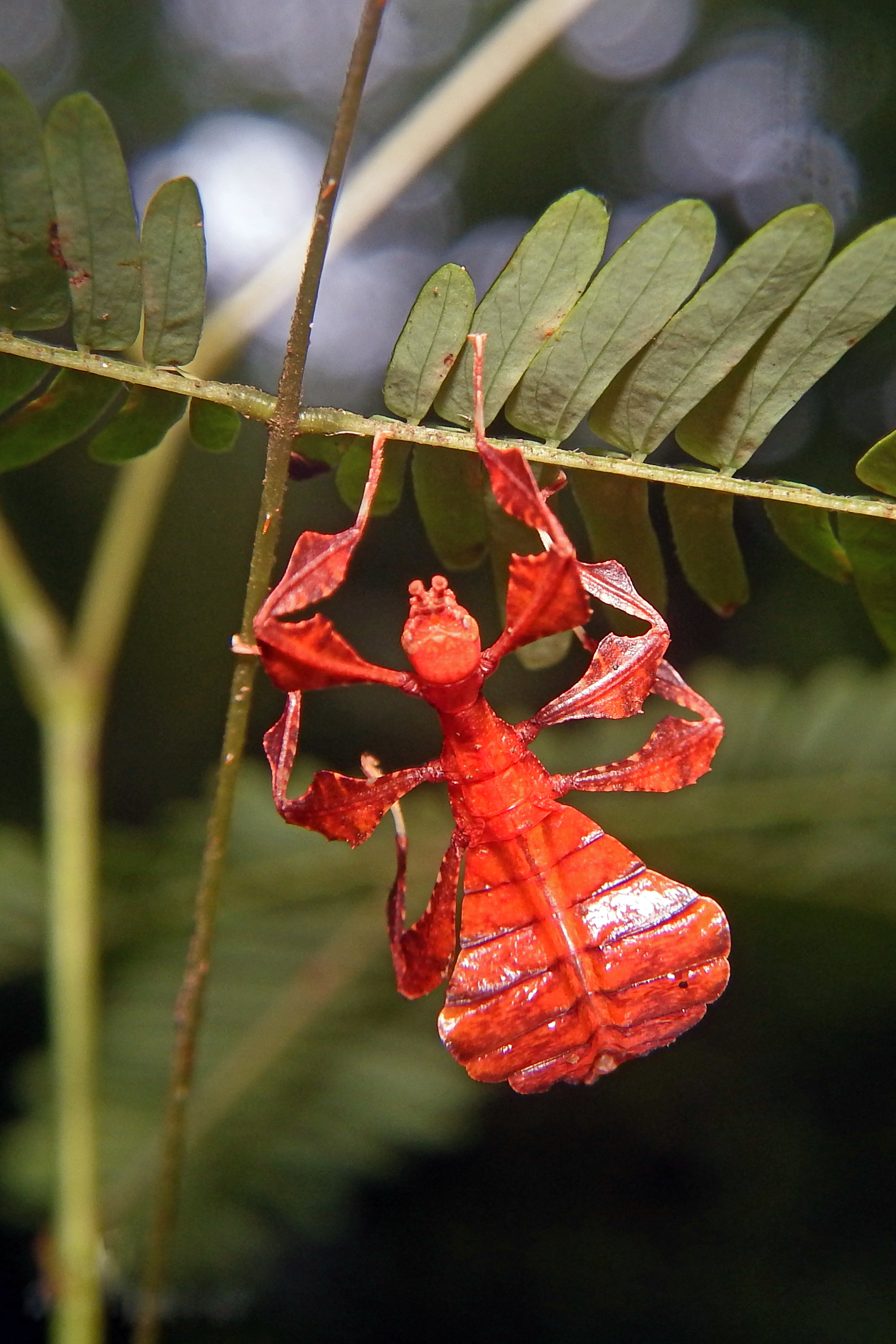
A leaf insect nymph. Its silhouette serves as the basis for the Reaper Destroyer.

A "proto-form human Reaper" encountered as the final boss of Mass Effect 2 provides insight into how the Reapers replenish their numbers, as it is the end product of harvested organic DNA which have been processed to make a new Reaper. According to Derek Watts, the game's Art Director, the concept of the "Reaper Baby" or Reaper-Human Larva was originally proposed by project director Casey Hudson, and the team decided to reference Sovereign from the first game to tie this creature to the same Reaper visual language. To reinforce the idea that its construction is incomplete, the team exposed a lot more of the Reaper-Human Larva's interior components and structures. Watts admitted that the art team struggled to finalize the creature's visual design based on Hudson's ideas; multiple concept drawings including one resembling a giant human fetus was considered but discarded for not being adequately threatening, and that last minute modifications to the final iteration were still necessary in order to fulfill the "level of creepiness" and combat requirements desired for the boss fight.

In the original trilogy, the Reapers' ground forces primarily consist of synthetic-organic creatures who were converted from harvested organic bodies. In the first two Mass Effect games, these creatures are primarily derived from humans impaled on spike-like Reaper structures called "dragon's teeth", and are called "husks". Mass Effect 2 introduced several variants of the husk unit: these include the scion, made up of several husks strung together in a grotesque manner, and the praetorian, a large monstrosity designed with numerous Husk heads visible inside its chest cavity to add a horrific and menacing feel. Reaper ground forces in Mass Effect 3 also include horrific, twisted versions of the series' other extraterrestrial species, including asari, batarians, krogan, turians, and the rachni, a sentient race of telepathic insectoid beings long thought to be extinct. These enemy types reflect the major fronts during the Reaper invasion in series lore, and help inform the team's approach of designing enemies that are under the command of the Reapers but are not themselves Reapers; the goal is to maintain the series' signature squad-based combat as opposed to directly pitting Shepard in an implausible fight against a colossal Reaper capital ship which is typically at least two-kilometres long. There are however certain sequences in Mass Effect 3 which involve smaller versions of Reapers landing on planets to do battle with Shepard. This class of Reapers, known as Destroyers, are 160 metres high and are given Sovereign's unused design of a leaf insect nymph silhouette.

The pariah is repurposed as the adjutant for the Mass Effect 3: Omega DLC pack.

According to the developers, the challenge of providing a unique look for these creatures inspired a wide variety of concept pieces, though some were eventually abandoned due to animation concerns, and certain enemy units that did not come with details on how it looked or how it fought were often repurposed for later content; for example, the praetorian's design is finalized to be floating instead of walking as it needed to be inserted into combat levels where the player could be attacked from above while taking cover. Other units like the pariah were cut from the main game, as their original ability to teleport around the battlefield were causing issues with the Mass Effect 3 physics engine. The large size of the Reaper assets themselves presented a technical challenge for the team to keep them running in the engine without sacrificing visual fidelity.

A number of ending sequences involving the Reapers were considered for Mass Effect 3 but abandoned. A very early idea involved Shepard being a willing subject of modification by Reaper technology, which echoes the character arc and downfall of Saren, the primary antagonist of the first Mass Effect who received extensive cybernetic alterations from the Reapers. The Illusive Man was originally intended to be the final boss fight, with the character transforming into a Reaper creature much like Saren at the end of the first game. Other ideas for an ending revolved around the Reapers' attempts to stop organics from utilizing dark energy due to its cumulative entropic effect that would hasten the end of the universe, or to prevent the universe's inevitable descent into the opposite of the Big Bang by focusing their attention on organic species with biotic potential.

== Appearances ==
The Reaper Sovereign is first mentioned in the novel Mass Effect: Revelation, which takes place 18 years before the events of the first Mass Effect game, where it is discovered by the turian Spectre Saren Arterius. In the first game, Sovereign is first sighted taking off to space when Shepard's team arrives at a settlement in the human colony of Eden Prime. A hologram of Sovereign is later encountered at Saren's base on the planet Virmire, where it declares itself the vanguard of a looming, unstoppable Reaper invasion. When Shepard encounters the Prothean Construct Vigil, it states that the motives for the Reapers' endless cycles of genocide, their origin and their habitation in dark space are all unknown to the Protheans, but suggests the Reapers go into hibernation in the void between galaxies so organic species will not stumble upon them when dormant. During the geth invasion of the Citadel led by Saren, he uses a Prothean Conduit to gain access to the Citadel and enable Sovereign to activate the Citadel mass relay. The player can then either attempt to kill Saren or appeal to Saren to fight his indoctrination, which if successful will prompt him to commit suicide. Shepard would later fight a revived and transformed Saren, who is possessed by Sovereign through his grafted cybernetics and resembles a husk with a turian silhouette. Upon defeat of the Sovereign-manipulated Saren, the Reaper loses its defenses and is destroyed by the combined might of the Citadel's defenders.

The genetically mutated remnants of the Prothean species known as the Collectors reveal themselves in Mass Effect 2. Coordinated by a Collector General, they kill Shepard and begin abducting human colonies throughout the galaxy in order to construct a new Reaper. Upon being revived by the anthropocentric paramilitary group Cerberus, Shepard joins forces with its leader, the Illusive Man, to recruit personnel in order to stop the Collectors. Shepard boards a derelict Reaper and acquires its IFF, then launches an assault on the Collector base which is located beyond the Omega-4 relay, where the incomplete Reaper-Human Larva is destroyed. Afterwards, the entity known as Harbinger who speaks through the Collector General reveals itself to be a Reaper; Harbinger reliquinshes control of the Collectors and is shown travelling through dark space to reach the Milky Way Galaxy along with the rest of its brethren.

The Reapers reach Earth by the beginning of Mass Effect 3, where they quickly overwhelm its defenses. Towards the end of Mass Effect 3, the human Systems Alliance and its allies launch an all-out assault on the Reapers in a last-ditch effort to retake Earth, and activate the Crucible by joining it with the Citadel as it is theorized to be capable of defeating the Reapers. Shepard reaches a Reaper transportation beam following an extended battle in London to enter the Citadel despite being gravely wounded by Harbinger. Following the resolution of a confrontation with the Illusive Man, Shepard attempts to fire off the Crucible, only to instead be lifted to the pinnacle of the Citadel, where the childlike Catalyst appears and declares itself to be the creator of the Reapers. Having conceded defeat to Shepard, it presents up to three options for activating the Crucible, which will break the Reapers' galactic cycle of extinction forever. Extended Cut expands upon the game's original endings with an additional choice to refuse the Catalyst, which inevitably results in a Reaper victory over the current cycle of organics.

While the Reapers do not appear in Mass Effect: Andromeda, Pathfinder Ryder can discover that the true purpose of the Andromeda Initiative was motivated by the Reapers and their cycle of extinction. After Sovereign's attack on the Citadel, the Initiative's anonymous benefactor believed that Shepard's warnings about their impending return were genuine, and so shifted their focus to preserving the Milky Way Galaxy's civilizations. They poured virtually unlimited resources into the bankrupt Initiative while using it as a cover to hasten the arks' departure for the Andromeda Galaxy, eventually departing between the events of Mass Effect 2 and Mass Effect 3 shortly before the Reaper invasion and allowing the colonists to start anew away from their cycle. Since none of the endings in Mass Effect 3 are established in Andromeda, the outcome of the Reaper war is unknown to Ryder.

== Promotion and merchandise ==
The Reaper invasion of Earth is depicted prominently in promotional and marketing material for the March 6, 2012 launch of Mass Effect 3. As part of their marketing campaign for Mass Effect 3, BioWare set up a Twitter account named AllianceNewsNetwork in November 2011. On the launch date of Mass Effect 3, Jason Schreier posted on Kotaku and reported that "participants have spent the day tweeting fake news and survival strategies" about the Reaper invasion, and that tweets were uploaded on the Twitter account under the pretense of minor supporting character Emily Wong detailing her experiences as a frontline journalist.

A limited edition collectible statue of Sovereign, standing at 18.5 inches tall, was released by BioWare in late 2012.

== Reception ==
The critical reception of the Reapers is generally favorable. Kotaku's Gergo Vas considered Shepard's multiple encounters with the Reapers to be some of the original trilogy's most iconic moments. Evan Narcisse, also from Kotaku, considered the Reapers to be frightening antagonists as they are entities that felt like "un-life" and represent the continual malevolent erasure of sentient life forms. He said the conversation with Sovereign in Virmire is one of the most chilling encounters he has ever experienced in a video game, and later described the scene as the moment where Mass Effect went from being a generic sci fi story to "a story about the larger existential threat that the universe faced". Sal Basile from Ugo.com considered the first time Shepard encounters a charging Husk after it is detached from a "dragon's teeth" pillar and Sovereign's reveal of the truth about the Protheans and the Reapers to be among the series' most shocking moments, setting a defining tone that it is not a simple "lasers set to stun" space game. Stacey Henley from The Courier said the husks are much more sinister and horrifying then the typical idea of a zombie with rotting flesh, as it represents "the notion of our bodies deleting themselves cell by cell and adding cybernetics in their place". She noted that Mass Effect "really leans into the unsettling horror of these creatures" when non-human Husk variants are introduced in the third game. IGN staff enjoyed the encounter with a smaller Reaper ship towards the end of Mass Effect 3 as they were afforded the opportunity to equip the M-920 Cain superweapon.

Harbinger placed No. 39 on IGN's list of top 100 video game villains. In 2013, the Reapers placed No. 97 on GamesRadar's list of 100 best villains in video games, and No. 21 on a reader's poll organized by Guinness Book of Records for their list of top 50 video game villains of all time. Conversely, Ron Whitaker from The Escapist included the Reaper-Human Larva in his list of terrible video game villains. He criticized the lack of fear the creature inspires and the boss fight to be overly easy in difficulty, though he still considers the Reapers as a whole to be a believable threat.

A much-discussed fan theory arose in response to fan outrage over the controversial ending of Mass Effect 3, which suggests that its ending is all an illusion caused by the Reapers indoctrinating Shepherd. The theory proposes that Shepherd's prolonged exposure to Reaper technology throughout the trilogy as well as experiences of bizarre dream sequences in Mass Effect 3 indicated signs of gradual indoctrination by the Reapers, bringing the battle with the Reapers down to an intrinsic level as Shepard fights the Reaper's influence in their own mind during the ending sequence. BioWare staff declined to comment when questioned about the fan theory, whereas Karpyshyn was of the view that fans would still be dissatisfied had the developers of Mass Effect 3 gone with the alternate endings he proposed.

=== Analysis ===
Tauriq Moosa from Polygon suggested that the idea of an all-consuming uncaring god stretches across BioWare's most popular franchises, including Mass Effect. He observed that Shepard spent the entire trilogy preparing for war against god-like beings who "essentially, created existence", and compared the Reapers' cycle of destruction by design to "children with an ant farm and magnifying glass". David Callahan, an associate professor at the University of Aveiro, Portugal, described the Reapers' acts of genocide as their practice of intervention by altering a whole species' destiny or even terminating them, noting that this is not unlike what settler-invader peoples historically did, and are still doing, to Indigenous peoples around the world.

== In popular culture ==
In 2014, BioWare published an interview with Danish fans who constructed a Reaper model predominantly made from various kinds of foam.

A prominent fan mod for Grand Theft Auto V replaces the game's floating blimps with a detailed model of a Reaper capital ship.

A Reaper Destroyer is featured as the antagonist of the Mass Effect: New Earth motion simulator amusement park ride.
