= Mass Effect 3: Omega =

- Developer: BioWare
- Publisher: Electronic Arts
- Series: Mass Effect
- Engine: Unreal Engine 3
- Platforms: Microsoft Windows; PlayStation 3 Xbox 360
- Release: November 27, 2012; November 28, 2012 (PS3 in Europe)
- Genres: Action role-playing, third-person shooter
- Mode: Single-player

Mass Effect 3: Omega is a major downloadable content (DLC) pack developed by BioWare and published by Electronic Arts for the 2012 action role-playing video game Mass Effect 3. It was released for Microsoft Windows, PlayStation 3, and Xbox 360 on November 27, 2012, with a delayed release in Europe on the PlayStation 3 platform set for November 28, 2012. The pack follows Commander Shepard (Mark Meer/Jennifer Hale) and the asari pirate queen Aria T'Loak (Carrie-Anne Moss) as they attempt to liberate the space station Omega from the anthropocentric terrorist group Cerberus. Omega expanded beyond the developers' original plan during its development cycle, both in response to a mandate of freedom by BioWare management and as a result of the development team's desire to develop the experience they wanted, and incorporates cut content from the main game.

Omega received mixed reviews from critics; the temporary squadmates who join Shepard for the duration of the DLC pack and the new enemy types they face are generally well received, while its strong emphasis on linear combat sequences, lack of compelling storytelling, and price point of the pack has been criticized.

== Plot ==
In the Citadel, Shepard meets crime lord Aria T'Loak, who explains that a Cerberus invasion led by the Illusive Man's top strategist, Oleg Petrovsky, has forced her into exile from Omega. After uniting the Blue Suns, Eclipse, and Blood Pack, Aria persuades Shepard to lend their support in retaking Omega. The attack force penetrates Omega's defenses and establishes a foothold in the station in Aria's hidden bunker. Aria and Shepard set out to establish an alliance with the Talons, a mercenary organization that dislikes Aria but despises Cerberus more. They encounter Nyreen Kandros, a turian biotic with whom Aria had a relationship that ended on bad terms. Nyvreen is later revealed to be the Talons' leader.

Tensions grow between Aria and Nyreen, who is concerned that Aria's determination to regain the throne will result in unnecessary destruction. They and Shepard set out to disable a Cerberus-controlled reactor in the Element Zero mines, which would release Omega's imprisoned citizens. En route, they discover Petrovsky has created Adjutants, Reaper creatures engineered by Cerberus to serve as shock troops. At the reactor, Shepard can disable or destroy it at Aria's urging, the latter resulting in many civilian casualties. Omega's citizens attack Cerberus, stretching their forces thin. Aria, Shepard and Nyvreen fight their way to Petrovsky's headquarters in Afterlife, and Nyvreen sacrifices herself to destroy a group of Adjutants. Petrovsky traps Aria in a stasis field and releases the remaining Adjutants on Shepard, but Shepard kills them and releases Aria, forcing Petrovsky to surrender. Depending on Shepard's actions, Petrovsky is either killed by Aria or handed over to Alliance custody. Regardless, Aria takes back her throne and pledges her aid in stopping the Reapers.

== Gameplay ==
Mass Effect 3: Omega is a downloadable content (DLC) pack for the 2012 action role-playing video game Mass Effect 3. The player assumes the role of Commander Shepard, an elite human soldier who commandeers the SSV Normandy SR-2 starship. The DLC pack is set within the Milky Way galaxy in 2186, during the midst of a galaxy-wide invasion by a highly advanced machine race of synthetic-organic starships known as the Reapers, and prior to Shepard leading Earth's final stand. The narrative for the DLC pack begins after Shepard speaks to Aria T'Loak at the Citadel space station's Purgatory nightclub, where she is depicted as plotting her revenge in exile. To access the DLC, the player must accept her request to help her retake Omega, which has been occupied and blockaded by Cerberus General Oleg Petrovsky's forces during the events of Mass Effect: Invasion. In return for Shepard's aid, she pledges ships, troops, and resources under her command to the war effort against the Reapers.

Shepard's squadmates do not appear for the duration of the pack; Aria accompanies Shepard throughout the course of the narrative. They are joined in Omega by Nyreen Kandros, a turian biotic operative who has assumed command of the local Talon mercenary group. While the player is usually assisted by Aria and Nyreen that are controlled by the game's artificial intelligence, Omega occasionally involves the player to fight solo. Two new enemy types were introduce in Omega: the Rampart mech, combat androids deployed by Cerberus to control the civilian population of Omega; and the adjutants, husk-like creatures engineered by Cerberus through co-opting Reaper technology, which played an instrumental role in securing their victory over Aria's forces in Invasion. Omega includes three achievements, and also unlocks new weapon types and mods as well as two new biotic powers which could be assigned to Shepard upon completion of the pack.

== Development and release ==
Omega was developed by BioWare Montreal, a former subsidiary which was formed to assist BioWare's Edmonton studio, and published by Electronic Arts. At the time of its release, Omega was Mass Effect 3's biggest DLC pack to date. According to BioWare Montreal producer Fabrice Condominas, Omega was not originally designed to be four hours long and nearly 2GB in size. He revealed in an interview that BioWare management gave the Montreal design team free rein to fully explore Aria's story as the de facto ruler of Omega station until the incursion by Cerberus, noting that mandate of freedom for the team was not common practice in the video game industry as a whole. Condominas identified the need to explore the strong moral choices throughout the pack's narrative as the reason for the design team's shifting goals, resulting in the project's unintentional expansion in scope and scale, with the only constraint the team faced in terms of length were technical in nature.

Nyreen Kandros in battle against the adjutants, as she appears in Mass Effect 3: Omega.

In a developer's post uploaded on BioWare's official blog, Condominas explained that Shepard "must make decisions based on Aria and Nyreen's knowledge of Omega while balancing their radically different points of view on how to go about liberating the station". Condominas noted that the DLC pack's promotional subtitle, "how far are you willing to go?" is what the player must consider when dealing with moral choices, as these decisions will impact the densely populated station's civilians. The developers decided to focus on character relationships as the downloadable content's core theme. Omega station itself, home to the “lawless of the galaxy” and the nominal capital of its home system, was treated "as a character from a narrative standpoint" and the nature of the relationship between Aria and the space station she rules was defined as "one of deep love, where passion and jealousy are involved". The DLC pack's narrative anchor revolves around the triumvirate between Aria, Nyreen, and Omega station: Aria being driven out of the space station she once ruled was described to be akin to "someone whose lover has been taken away", while Nyreen is presented as a calming influence to offset Aria's rage. Condominas explained that Aria's vengeful approach is efficient but comes at a cost, while Nyreen's priority is to protect Omega's civilian population though it is a riskier approach. Nyreen was originally an Asari mercenary unrelated to the player's mission to retake Omega station or have any history with Aria, but Mass Effect 3 writer Ann Lemay decided to expand the character's role as a foil to Aria. Lemay also used the opportunity to redesign Nyreen and introduce her as the first major Turian female character in the Mass Effect trilogy.

Aspects BioWare considered to be challenging during the development cycle of Omega are the combat design as Omega station is a complex space, as well as balancing Aria's biotic abilities with the DLC pack's gameplay. The adjutants, also called "pariahs" early in development, were originally envisioned to possess the ability to teleport around the battlefield, but were never fully developed as their abilities "proved too much even for the relatively generous physics of the Mass Effect universe." They were ultimately cut from the main game and re-purposed for Omega.

Omega was not released for the Wii U version of Mass Effect 3.

== Reception ==
Reception

Aggregate score
Aggregator	Score
Metacritic	60/100 (X360); 59/100 (PC)

Review scores
Publication	Score
Destructoid	3/5
Eurogamer	4/10
GameRevolution	3.5/5
GameSpot	5.5/10
Official Xbox Magazine (UK)	8/10
Official Xbox Magazine (US)	6.5/10
VentureBeat	70/100

Omega received generally mixed reviews from critics. GameSpot editor Kevin VanOrd criticized Omega's "shallow storytelling" which squander its potential, and compared the pack's self-contained nature unfavorably to Mass Effect 2's "wonderful add-ons, which were pleasantly inserted into the adventure at large". VanOrd noted that once the player completes Omega, "the galaxy doesn't care, which is just as well, since you don't make any substantial decisions anyway. You can't return to the space station, you gain no crew members or Normandy guests, and Aria is deposited back on the Citadel--a bizarre circumstance fully at odds with her character arc". He concluded that what remains "is all that combat, which seems to go on interminably with too little to break it up". Eurogamer's Tom Phillips said combat is Omega's best aspect, but drew comparisons between it and Mass Effect 2's Arrival, which he considers to be a "disappointing expansion that saw Shepard leave his team behind and embark on a meandering quest to bridge the story between Mass Effect 2 and 3". He asserted that the in-universe excuses given that Shepard must travel alone to Omega without the Normandy or its crew "serves no story purpose here" and that this line of reasoning "barely works in Arrival". Phillips listed a number of the pack's shortcomings, including the developer's questionable handling of the pack's setting and its cast of characters, and concluded that "BioWare has had a year to get Omega right. It didn't."

Eduardo Moutinho, writing for GamesBeat, gave an overall favorable review for Omega, though the title of his article suggested that it is "somewhat pointless". He commented that Omega "doesn't bring enough of that signature storytelling to the forefront", noting that while he "love pulling the right trigger to shoot dudes", he also enjoyed "using the same button to interrupt a cutscene even more". Jessica Vasquez from Game Revolution commented that "probably the best thing that comes out of this DLC are the two new powers you unlock, Lash and Flare". She noted that there are significant differences between the six possible endings depending on the player's Renegade or Paragon alignment choices, four of which are distinctly different. Vasquez is disappointed that the player is unable to return to Omega after completing the pack, and none of the decisions made by the player is translated to the main campaign, referenced by Shepard's crew, or have any impact on the ending whatsoever. Daniel Starkey from Destructoid found Omega to be disappointing overall and its gunplay to be slightly mediocre, but commented "there are a few new enemies that are fun twists on creatures with which we are already familiar".

The US edition of the Official Xbox Magazine commented that Omega has hints of some rich backstory, but called it a "limited, pricey thrill aimed only at the series' most devoted fans" given its negligible narrative impact on the main game. The UK edition of the Official Xbox Magazine gave a more favorable review, commenting that "small-scale stories are what Bioware does best" and that "long-term Mass Effect fans will appreciate this return visit" in spite of the pack's steep price.
