= Mass Effect: Revelation =

2007 science fiction novel

- Original cover of Mass Effect: Revelation
- Author: Drew Karpyshyn
- Language: English
- Series: Mass Effect
- Genre: Science fiction
- Publisher: Del Rey Books
- Publication date: May 1, 2007
- Publication place: Canada
- Media type: Print (Paperback)
- Pages: 323
- ISBN: 978-0-345-49816-8
- OCLC: 150381260
- Followed by: Mass Effect: Ascension

Mass Effect: Revelation is a science fiction novel by Drew Karpyshyn, who was the lead writer of the Mass Effect series. Published in 2007 by Del Rey Books, it is the first novel set in the Mass Effect universe, and the prequel to the Mass Effect video game by BioWare.

== Plot ==
The book serves to fill in much of the background details of the game, such as locations and the internal politics of the Council's races, as well as characters. A considerable amount of the plot revolves around the galaxy's views on artificial intelligence, as this appears to be a major plot point in the game.

The book tells of a young Alliance lieutenant, David Anderson, and his efforts to find a survivor of an attack on a top-secret Alliance base, lieutenant Kahlee Sanders. As the book progresses it is revealed the base was attacked purposely by the Blue Suns mercenary group, who were hired by the leading scientist on the base. A turian Spectre, Saren Arterius, is assigned to help Anderson and find clues as to where the missing scientist is located. Eventually they find the scientist, but Saren escapes with the information the scientist was researching to an ancient alien ship which he plans to use for his own evil deeds as portrayed as the main plot in the game Mass Effect.

== Reception ==
In the novel's coverage by the video game press, it was described as appealing primarily to fans of the game series. Ars Technica's reviewer wrote that it did an admirable job of laying out the fictional universe, and recommended it to those with an interest in the game. Thunderbolt Games characterized it as "formulaic in just the right ways, as it seamlessly transitions the best aspects of Mass Effect’s interactive fiction into an easily digested, compulsive read for fans of the universe." The reviewer noted that the novel's clean and efficient prose suited the directness of the story and avoided needless infodumps, but did "also restrain the book from truly elevating itself to great science-fiction." SF Signal's review of the "decent, if not spectacular, novel" characterized the writing as "workmanlike" and the characters as undeveloped, and criticized the novel's infodumps as well as the omniscient narrator's use of exclamation marks. Brendan Lowry from Windows Central praised the characterizations of Anderson and Saren in Revelation, commenting that the novel is well-written and "gives a large amount of information about the history of the universe, including how humanity became part of the galactic community."

== See also ==
- List of novels based on video games
