= Mass Effect Infiltrator =

2012 video game

- Developer: IronMonkey Studios
- Publisher: Electronic Arts
- Designer: Jarrad Trudgen
- Series: Mass Effect
- Platforms: BlackBerry 10, iOS, Android, Windows Phone
- Release: March 6, 2012
- Genre: Third-person shooter
- Mode: Single-player

Mass Effect Infiltrator was a third-person shooter video game developed by IronMonkey Studios, released on 6 March 2012 for iOS, 22 May 2012 for Android, and 13 June 2013 for BlackBerry 10.

== Gameplay ==
A screenshot of the game illustrating the combat

Mass Effect Infiltrator is a three-dimensional, third-person shooter which mimics many of the gameplay features and animations of the main Mass Effect games, including the use of cover and the combination of gunplay and biotic powers. The controls are simplified from the console games and adapted to fit a touchscreen interface; for example, there are no squadmates to control, and it is necessary to target enemies for biotic attacks by tapping directly on the screen.

The player is rewarded with credits over the course of the game, and these may be spent on upgraded weapons, armour and biotic abilities. The player also collects Intel, which can be exchanged for ingame credits or used to add to the player's Galactic Readiness score in Mass Effect 3. Upon the completion of the game, the player is rewarded with a new War Asset in their Mass Effect 3 game.

In April 2012 a major update was released for Mass Effect Infiltrator, bringing the version to 1.0.3. The update added an extra side mission in which the player takes the role of an escaped turian experiment victim, as well as the ability to manually aim weapons. The patch also includes technical optimisations designed for the third-generation iPad.

Windows 8 and Windows 8.1 users have verified that the game works on their platforms.

== Plot ==
The protagonist of Mass Effect Infiltrator is Cerberus operative Randall Ezno. At the opening of the game he is deployed to an ice planet, charged with bringing down a turian that Cerberus has marked for death. Upon returning to a Cerberus base known as The Barn, he is caught in a mass prisoner escape, and discovers that his advisor Inali is being horribly experimented on against her will. Randall must then battle his way across the installation, fighting Cerberus troops and escaped prisoners alike in order to rescue her and contact the Alliance to request a rescue.

== Development ==
After releasing the first Mass Effect game, BioWare began prototyping a Mass Effect game influenced by the design Star Control, in parallel with the main Mass Effect trilogy. The concept evolved into Mass Effect: Corsair, a first-person spaceship game designed for the Nintendo DS. The story would have taken place in the Terminus Systems, featuring a Han Solo inspired character immersed in a pirate-controlled setting. However, Electronic Arts predicted low sales on the Nintendo DS, and the team was transitioned to developing Mass Effect Infiltrator for iOS, Android, and Blackberry.

Infiltrator was developed by IronMonkey Studios, after Bioware handed them the bulk of production and content creation. IronMonkey applied their experience from developing Dead Space for mobile platforms, allowing them to refine the game's engine and technical aspects. According to lead designer Jarrad Trudgen, the team "added post-processing and an advanced material system, giving our artists much more freedom to create variety and bigger, more open, and more detailed environments." The designers decided to focus on the action gameplay of the Mass Effect franchise, eschewing role-playing elements such as a dialog system.

== Reception ==
Reception

Aggregate score
Aggregator	Score
Metacritic	68/100

Review scores
Publication	Score
Game Informer	7/10
IGN	6.5/10
VideoGamer.com	5/10
Slide to Play	2.5/10
Eurogamer Italy	6/10

Reviews of Mass Effect Infiltrator have generally been mixed, and the review aggregator Metacritic, which assigned scores as a weighted average of reviews, assigned Mass Effect Infiltrator a score of 68 based on 27 reviews. Slide To Play initially gave the game a poor review, criticizing the controls and noting that while the graphics are "detailed and highly impressive", the environments themselves were stale and repetitive. After the 1.0.3 update however, the review was updated to state that the game had "graduated from a clunky mess to a high-quality shooter." PCMag described it as "a decent enough game," praising the visuals but calling the combat repetitive and the controls tricky.
