= Grunt (Mass Effect) =

Fictional character in the Mass Effect series

- Mass Effect character
- Grunt as he appears in Mass Effect 2 (2010)
- First appearance: Mass Effect 2 (2010)
- Voiced by: Steve Blum

In-universe information
- Race: Krogan

Grunt, known as Urdnot Grunt following the completion of his personal quest, is a character in BioWare's Mass Effect franchise. The character made his first appearance in Mass Effect 2 as a party member or "squadmate". Grunt makes a return in Mass Effect 3 as a supporting non-player character. Grunt is voiced by American voice actor Steve Blum.

Grunt was designed to represent both a youth-like appearance and a certain level of roughness, with his armor depicting the padding of a linebacker. Grunt is a quasi-adolescent tank-bred Krogan who experiences a set of anger-related issues and had been created by Warlord Okeer, who player character Commander Shepard was initially intended to recruit. In order to control his anger, Shepard aids Grunt in his "Rite of Passage", which grants him an entrance into Krogan clan Urdnot. In Mass Effect 3, Grunt leads Krogan squad Aralakh Company in a planet under raid by the Rachni, a race of insectoid aliens with a collective consciousness. Grunt's fate in the trilogy is dependant on player choice, with him being able to die in multiple occasions.

Grunt has received a mostly positive critical reception and has become popular in the cosplay and fan art communities. Journalists praised his initial design, introduction, and appearance in the Mass Effect 3: Citadel downloadable content while criticizing his character development following his personal mission. Grunt has also attracted academic analysis examining his characterization as a genetically engineered being, including discussions of his personhood, social integration, and ties to body horror and biopolitical themes.

== Concept and design ==
=== Visual design ===
Grunt was first revealed in the "Mass Effect 2: Meet Grunt" trailer, becoming the second party member revealed for the game after Thane Krios. Grunt is a member of the Krogan, a species of reptilian humanoid extraterrestrials that were uplifted by the Salarians to fight a war. Following the Krogan's aggressive reproductive and expansionist practices, the Salarians genetically modified them to the point of leaving them nearly sterile. In designing Grunt, the Mass Effect art team wanted to create a character that represented both a youth-like appearance and a certain level of roughness. To achieve this, the art team redesigned Krogan head-crests to make them grow larger as the individuals of the species aged, going as far as creating concepts for older Krogan possessing larger crests as a result. This led to Grunt's head-crest being smaller than other Krogan's, neither fully developed nor covering his entire skull. In an interview, lead character artist Jaemus Wurzback made a comparison between the final look of Grunt's semi-formed head plate and the soft skull of a newborn baby. Wurzback also described the decision to give Grunt a lizard-like skin instead of the tortoise-like one that had already been established for adult Krogan.

Grunt's armor was designed to contrast with the old, battle-scarred armor of Mass Effect's original Krogan party member Urdnot Wrex. The art team compared Grunt's initial armor design to the "showroom finish" of a new vehicle, with it featuring a shiny white look meant to reflect that it had not yet experienced battle. This armor design also resembles the padding of a linebacker, featuring large shoulder pads and exposed muscular arms. When the 3D-modeling process for Grunt started, Wurzback ultimately made the decision to abandon the flawless look of Grunt's armor and give it a slightly worn appearance, adding minor scratches and wear to the final design.

=== Narrative design and voice acting ===
The team designed Mass Effect 2's squadmates based on archetypes that would serve as the basis for each character's personality and attributes. For Grunt, this archetype was that of the "grunt". During early stages, Grunt was conceived as a "Design-a-Krogan", a concept in which the player would have been able to select part of Grunt's background, including his father. In a series of interviews, Mass Effect 2 writer Brian Kindregan discussed the existence of a cut confrontation scene between Grunt and Salarian squadmate Mordin Solus regarding the latter's role in the maintenance of the genophage, the artificial population control plague that was inflicted on Grunt's species. This confrontation was ultimately discarded due to financial considerations stemming from the game's scope and the perceived complexity of creating another confrontation. Kindregan further stated that he considered Grunt's level of emotional intelligence to be incompatible with him having a simple argument with Mordin, noting how Grunt would have started a fight instead.

The vocal specifications given to auditioners called for someone that could display a sense of innocence and discovery in an otherwise powerful and intimidating character. American voice actor Steve Blum was selected for the job, while Ginny McSwain served as voice director. Blum was unaware of how the voices of other Krogan had been performed in previous games, and his voice ultimately had to be pitched deeper in post-production. Blum further described the voice acting process as a collaborative one between McSwain and himself, stating that Grunt's "inexperience in his new world gave him some interesting layers [...] to chew on".

== Appearances ==
=== In Mass Effect video games ===
Mass Effect 2 revolves around Commander Shepard's attempts to stop a series of abductions performed on human colonists by a mysterious insectoid alien race known as the Collectors. In an effort to build a team to stop the abductions, Shepard attempts to recruit Okeer, a Krogan warlord and doctor who had been experimenting with genetic technologies in an attempt to create an army of Krogan not affected by the genophage. However, Okeer dies near the completion of the mission, leaving Shepard to retrieve a tank containing Okeer's perfect creation, which Okeer had neurologically implanted with a series of memories glorifying Krogan history and purity. Should the player decide to open the tank, the Krogan attacks Shepard in confusion, unaware of his situation, and ultimately names himself Grunt. As a tank-bred Krogan, Grunt was born without a clan, which leads to him being socially shunned by other Krogan.

During a personal sidequest the player must complete in order to gain Grunt's loyalty, Shepard must venture to the Krogan home world of Tuchanka to find a way to allow Grunt to control his anger. On the planet, the Krogan leader (either Urdnot Wrex or his brother Wreav) determines that Grunt is undergoing the Krogan version of adolescence. Shepard then aids Grunt in completing a trial known as the Rite of Passage that every adolescent Krogan must complete. Following its completion, Grunt joins clan Urdnot and attains the name Urdnot Grunt. Similarly to every other squadmate in Mass Effect 2, Grunt can perish during the game's final mission, the Suicide Mission.

Grunt makes an appearance as a supporting character in a sidequest in Mass Effect 3, provided he survived the events of Mass Effect 2. Grunt is found on the surface of the planet of Utukku, leading a Krogan squad known as Aralakh Company. The sidequest revolves around the presence of the Rachni, the race of insectoid aliens that the Krogan were uplifted to fight against, on the planet. In the quest, the player gets to decide whether to save or kill the Rachni Queen, with Grunt's fate decided by whether Shepard helped him to complete his Rite of Passage in Mass Effect 2. Grunt can also show up in the Mass Effect 3: Citadel downloadable content.

== Reception and analysis ==
=== Reception and promotion ===
Grunt has attained significant relevance in popular culture, becoming popular in the cosplay and fanart communities. Pieces of merchandise have been released based on the character, including a Funko Pop! released as a part of a Mass Effect line and a plush toy developed by Sanshee. Grunt's role as a squadmate in Mass Effect 2 and as a supporting character in Mass Effect 3 has led to his inclusion in many best Mass Effect character lists, with praise going for his conception and criticism towards his character development. Kenneth Shepard of Kotaku criticized how Grunt could sometimes be perceived as a "Wrex replacement", while stating that they were ultimately very different characters and praising Grunt's sacrifice in Mass Effect 3 and his appearance in the Citadel DLC. Jhaan Elker of The Washington Post's Launcher found the character's design as a genetic amalgamation of the Krogan as interesting, but disliked how he became very similar to other Krogan in the game after the completion of his personal quest, only becoming interesting in Mass Effect 3 and the Citadel DLC. Wes Fenlon of PC Gamer viewed Grunt's visual design positively, comparing his suit to the look of Iron Man. Fenlon noted that Grunt did not have much to add as a character, but said that this provided a refreshing change to the "philosophizing and soul-searching of the rest of the crew".

Various writers have praised some of the character's moments in both of the games in which he appears. Stacey Henley of TheGamer viewed Grunt's first scene as one of the best character introductions she had ever witnessed, arguing that his complex recruitment mission gave the player two different chances to get to know him. Henley praised both the initial attempt by Shepard to recruit Warlord Okeer on the planet Korlus and Grunt's release from his tank, maintaining that by allowing the player to encounter another tank-bred Krogan during the mission, the game gave them an insight that Grunt would not be one-dimensional. In an article published by Vice, Rowan Kaiser discussed the Grunt's appearance in Mass Effect 3, observing that the quest's responsiveness in regards to the Rachni queen undercuts itself by allowing Grunt to live. Cian Maher, also writing for TheGamer, regarded Grunt as his second favorite Mass Effect companion, noting him as one of the most loyal characters in the series and commending his sacrifice in Mass Effect 3, even though he ultimately survives.

=== Analysis ===
Grunt's situation as a created tank-bred Krogan has been analyzed through the lens of personhood and enculturation. Eamon Reid discussed it under Tristan Garcia's concept of we in We Ourselves, noting that he was Mass Effect's first weless character until joining clan Urdnot, when he becomes a we-of-ideas. (Note: Tristan Garcia describes we as the act of belonging in a political subject; and we-of-ideas as the we that a subject is able to choose and can be changed at will. Garcia, Tristan (January 1, 2021) We Ourselves: The Politics of Us, Letting Be II pp. 5, 43. ISBN 9781474475273) Reid further commented on Grunt's subpersoning in his PhD thesis, comparing his artificial origins to that of "God babies" in Gattaca and observing that by performing his rite of passage, Grunt matured and overcame puberty, pointing out "a way out of cultural stagnation" for the Krogan species. In his study of the portrayal of artificial lifeforms in video games, Christopher Könitz stated that Grunt displays free will, emotional capacity, and legal status, arguing that Grunt's narrative arc represented an affirmative process of enculturation. When comparing his in-universe conception to Miranda Lawson's, Könitz suggested that Grunt's status as a creation made him seek cultural integration, while Miranda searched for a personal integration. Stephanie Farnsworth drew comparisons between Grunt and Frankenstein's monster, remarking that both he and Miranda represent traditional body horror as mutants who mark the boundary between human and non-human. Farnsworth also examined Grunt's creation under Karel Čapek's depiction of robots in Rossum's Universal Robots, reaching the conclusion that Grunt represents the "neoliberal obsession with power through the military industrial complex".
