= Mordin Solus =

Fictional character from Mass Effect

- Mass Effect character
- Mordin Solus as he appears in Mass Effect 2
- First appearance: Mass Effect 2 (2010)
- Voiced by: Michael Beattie (Mass Effect 2); William Salyers (Mass Effect 3)

In-universe information
- Race: Salarian

Mordin Solus is a fictional character in BioWare's Mass Effect franchise, who serves as a party member (or "squadmate") in Mass Effect 2. Mordin returns as a supporting character in Mass Effect 3. A Salarian (one of Mass Effect's alien races) scientist who was once a member of the Salarian intelligence organization Special Tasks Group ("STG") earlier in his life, Mordin is depicted as a fast-talking and affable individual who is initially guided by scientific principles and logic, but later changes his mind and attempts to undo some of his earlier work. Mordin is voiced by Michael Beattie in Mass Effect 2 and William Salyers in Mass Effect 3.

Within the series' narrative, Mordin helped create and distribute measures to strengthen an artificial population control plague, named the genophage, used against the Krogan, a fast-breeding warlike alien race. Mordin is recruited in Mass Effect 2 as the Normandy's main doctor and scientist and defends his work on the genophage. He returns in Mass Effect 3, where he attempts to manufacture a cure for the genophage in response to the galaxy-wide invasion by the antagonistic Reapers and intends to distribute it in the atmosphere of Tuchanka, the Krogan home world. Mordin also makes an appearance in the ninth issue of the Mass Effect: Foundation comic series. Inspiration for his face was taken from Clint Eastwood, with developers differentiating him from other Salarians by making him older and removing one of his horns. David Kates composed his musical theme, a highly electronic piece that contains many counterpoint elements.

The character has been positively received, earning nominations for three "Best New Character" awards and numerous placements in "top character" lists. Critics have praised his fresh interpretation of the scientist trope and his approach towards philosophy and religion. At one point in the second game, Mordin sings an alternate version of Gilbert and Sullivan's Major-General's Song, which numerous critics considered one of the trilogy's best moments. His possible sacrificial death scene has received significant commentary commending its sadness and emotion. Scholars have discussed Mordin through a narratological point of view. As with other Mass Effect squadmates, merchandise for Mordin has been made, such as a bust and multiple PVC statues.

== Concept and design ==
=== Visual design ===
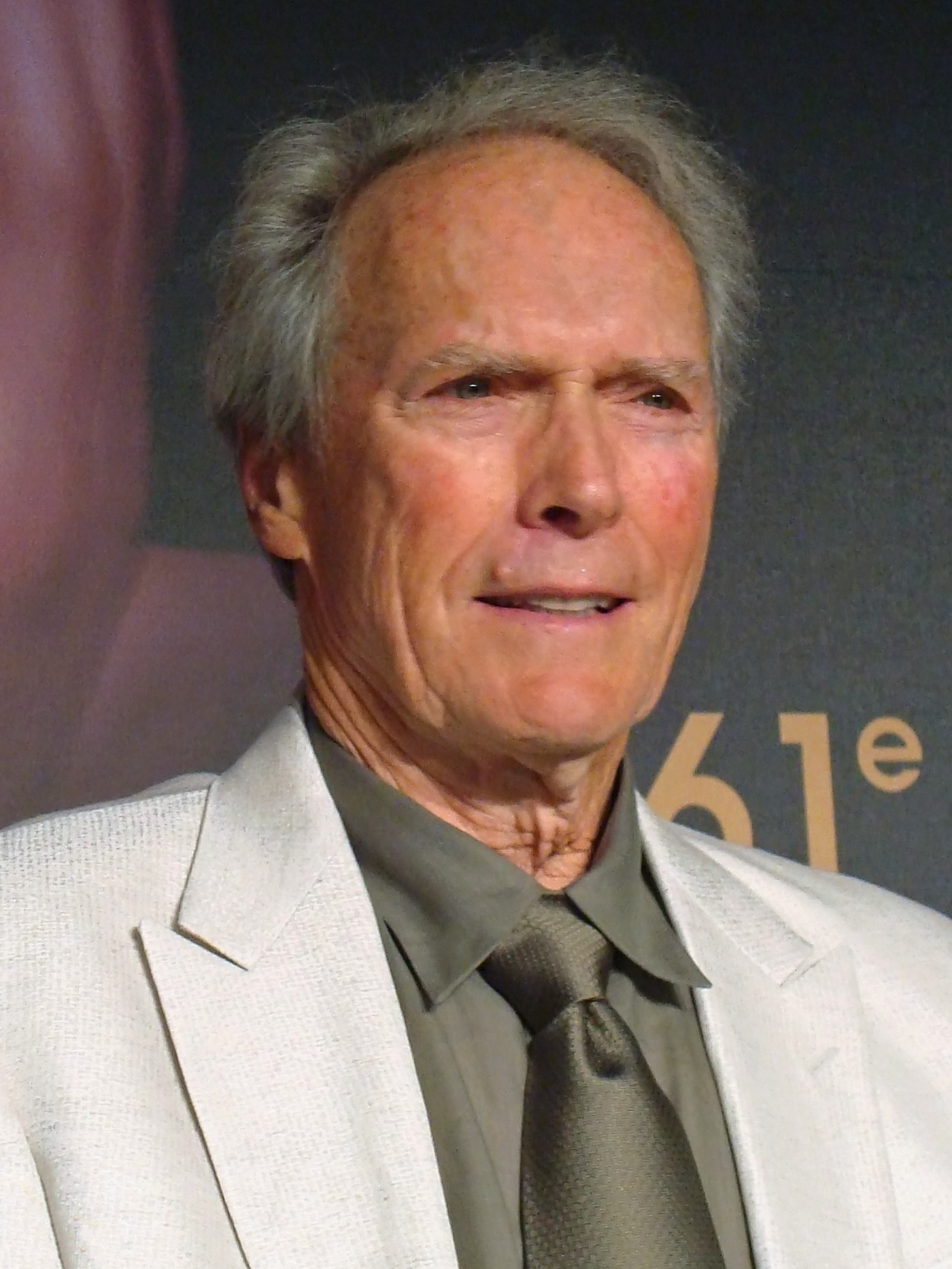
Concept art of the character and photo of Clint Eastwood, placing his wrinkles on the face of a Salarian.

The core concept of Mordin's design brief essentially asked "What would the Clint Eastwood Salarian look like?", and to that end one piece of concept art directly took features from a picture of Eastwood and incorporated them onto a Salarian, leading to Mordin's aged look. Due to his relative old age, Mordin allowed the developers to explore the later lifestages of the Mass Effect universe's aliens. Compared to other Salarians, Mordin's skin was designed to be more mottled and multi-colored in varying shades of brown, as well as weathered with age spots and wrinkles. To further differentiate Mordin from other Salarians, his facial features were slightly altered, with a more squared jawline and bulging cheekbones. The intention behind his facial design was to create a character that had visibly endured hardship in his life. Special emphasis was put on his eyes, which feature a wider color range and prominent inner eyelids to achieve an expressive look. They were also made smaller than in other members of his species, almost as if in a permanent squint.

Early sketches explored him as a field medic or a very experienced scientist. Other early concepts tried altering his head horns and eyeshape to make him unique. In his finished design, Mordin is missing one horn, with its origins left to the player's imagination. This missing horn is given alternate in-universe explanations in the second game's Lair of the Shadow Broker downloadable content pack and in the Mass Effect: Foundation comic series. Mordin's design tried to balance his scientific side with his role as a combat-ready tech specialist due to his background as a member of Salarian special forces. The final appearance of his clothing resembles a labcoat, similar to the clothing of other medical characters in the series. A metal collar was added to the neck of the labcoat to break up his silhouette, though it serves no purpose in dialogue or lore.

=== Narrative design and voice acting ===
Trick Weekes handled Mordin's writing in Mass Effect 2 and Mass Effect 3. The description initially handed to Weekes was "the scientist who redid the genophage", a fictional disease instilled by his species on the Krogan to greatly reduce their birth rates. This description, combined with his general warmth towards the original game's Krogan squadmate Urdnot Wrex, led Weekes to have a negative initial reaction towards the character. Weekes saw two ways to take the character: either have him as an unlikeable "war criminal", or challenge himself to make a character who believed had made the hard choice and done the right thing, ultimately deciding in favor of the latter. Mordin's final scene on Tuchanka in the third game, and its variations, were written by both Weekes and fellow senior writer John Dombrow, who wrote the genophage arc in the game. Weekes wished to give Mordin a "good send-off" in the scene.

A proposed confrontation scene between Mordin and a Krogan squadmate named Grunt, which would occur after he discovers the genophage's backstory and Mordin’s role as the scientist who strengthened it, was cut during the development of Mass Effect 2. Writer Brian Kindregan explained in an interview that planned content is usually cut due to time and financial considerations. The team had already developed two major confrontation scenes between other squadmates, which may complicate the player's preparations for the game's final mission due to the potential loss of a squadmate’s loyalty. Further costs would be incurred if Grunt's voice actor was called in for another voiceover session, which in turn would necessitate the organization of more sessions as well as work on animation sequences. From a narrative standpoint, Kindregan also believed that a character with low emotional intelligence like Grunt would take the direct approach by attacking and killing Mordin, as opposed to making a scene and demanding Shepard take his side for his argument with Mordin.

The vocal specifications given to auditioners called for someone able to be both dramatic and comedic, referencing Marshall Flinkman of Alias. The character was voiced by Michael Beattie in Mass Effect 2, though Beattie was replaced by William Salyers in Mass Effect 3, with Ginny McSwain serving as the voice director in both games. Beattie found challenge in portraying a character that spoke at a high speed. Initially, Beattie tried a higher-pitched voice, but as all the Salarians were pitched-up he ultimately used his natural voice. Following his replacement, Beattie wrote an open letter thanking fans who had vied for his return and has since shown interest in reprising the character.

Each squadmate in Mass Effect 2 had music composed for them, intended to convey their character; BioWare gave the composers detailed character studies for each to help. Mordin's theme was composed by David Kates, who considered Mordin's level one of the most fascinating he had worked on. The final composition is an electronic piece that contains many counterpoint elements, as well as "early retro synthesizer qualities".

== Appearances ==
Mordin Solus has made various appearances across different Mass Effect media. Aside from the video games, his background is explored in the ninth issue of the Mass Effect: Foundation comic series.

Mordin Solus makes his debut appearance in Mass Effect 2, where he is presented as a scientist and doctor of the fast-talking Salarian species. Mordin is first encountered by player character Commander Shepard when Mordin attempts to cure a deadly plague in Omega, a crime-ridden space station built in the crust of a metallic asteroid. It is then that Mordin is recruited as the ship doctor of the Normandy, the game's main space ship and hub, where Shepard can partake in a series of dialogue interactions with the character. At one point in these conversations, Mordin will sing a version of Gilbert and Sullivan's Major-General's song. These dialogues also introduce the player to Mordin's background as a scientist who had worked for a Salarian espionage organization to strengthen the genophage after learning the Krogan had begun to develop a resistance to it.

During a personal sidequest the player must complete in order to gain Mordin's loyalty, Shepard must aid Mordin in locating his former assistant on the genophage project, Maelon. Believing Maelon had been kidnapped by a Krogan clan, Shepard and Mordin venture to the Krogan home world of Tuchanka. There, they learn that Maelon had been voluntarily working on manufacturing a cure for the genophage through brutal experiments. The player ultimately gets to decide the fate of both Maelon and his research. Like every other squadmate in the game, Mordin may die during the game's final mission, the Suicide Mission.

Mordin returns in Mass Effect 3, provided he survived the events of Mass Effect 2. Mordin is first encountered on the Salarian home world of Sur'Kesh, where Shepard arrives in an attempt to cure the genophage to secure Krogan support in the Reaper War, an ongoing galactic invasion by a fleet of gigantic spacefaring sentient machines. Mordin had been working on a cure for the genophage, which could be synthesized from a Krogan female that had survived Maelon's experiments and was being kept on the planet. Mordin then aids Shepard in extracting Eve, the Krogan female. With a cure nearing completion, Shepard and Mordin depart toward Tuchanka alongside Eve and the Krogan leader to finish and spread the cure. Before arriving, Shepard receives a proposition by the Salarian leader to sabotage the cure's dispersal to secure Salarian aid for the war. Depending on the player's choices thus far, Shepard may: allow Mordin to cure the genophage at the cost of his life, shoot Mordin to prevent the genophage from being cured, or convince Mordin that it isn't the right time to cure the genophage. Mordin will only admit he had changed his mind on the genophage and made a mistake in his earlier work in reinforcing the genophage if the player does not notify him of the sabotage.

The ninth issue of the 2014 Mass Effect: Foundation comic explores Mordin's role in strengthening the Krogan genophage as a member of the STG. Shortly after deciding that the weakening of the genophage was unacceptable, Mordin creates a strengthened version of the disease and attempts to test it on a Krogan colony with the help of the STG and his assistant Maelon.

== Reception and analysis ==
=== Reception ===
Mordin has been received well as a party member, being nominated for several "best character" awards. Most notably, he earned best new character in Giant Bomb's "Game of the Year 2010" awards, tying for first place with Bayonetta. Mordin has also been included in multiple "top" character lists, with writers exploring his complexity and characterization. In a list put together by Wes Fenlon of PC Gamer, Tom Senior regarded Mordin as an antihero, a "calculating mind" hidden beneath an upbeat demeanor. Senior further commented on Mordin's "scientific brilliance" and character development, observing how he slowly opens up and reveals the problems he has faced. Jhaan Elker, writing for The Washington Post's Launcher, viewed Mordin as Mass Effect's "most well-defined character", comparing his high-speed speech patterns to those of William Shatner and commending Mordin's final moments, when he realizes he had made a mistake in regards to the genophage. Tom Phillips of Eurogamer called him one of the most complex characters, and noted how he represented one of the series' "greyest" plotlines.

Critics have examined Mordin's fresh interpretation of the scientist character trope and his approach towards religion and philosophy. 1Up.com's Jose Otero wrote an article explaining why Mordin was "awesome", saying he epitomized "the coolest nerd", and commending BioWare's transformation of the scientist trope into an "affable, fast-talking, tortured soul that believes in consequentialism". Otero also argued that Mordin's intelligence and backstory made the Mass Effect universe stronger. Jimmy Turner of RPGFan cited Mordin as an example of a character that displayed neurodivergent characteristics, pointing out his conflicting ethics and struggles with his past actions. Turner also suggested that him looking to religion to find peace made him a "refreshing take" on the scientist trope.

Several moments of the character have resonated with commentators. Mordin's singing of Gilbert and Sullivan has been viewed as one of the best gaming moments of 2010 and one of the best moments of the Mass Effect trilogy, with praise for its humorous and happy nature. The general conclusion of his character arc has also drawn attention, with his potential sacrificial death scene earning "Best Moment" in Game Informer's 2012 RPG of the Year Awards. Phil Savage of PC Gamer praised Mordin's final arc, stating that his "greatest achievement in the eyes of his people" becomes his greatest regret, while resonating with the sadness of his death scene. Michael A. Cunningham of RPGamer considered Mordin's death scene as "a powerful moment" that shined despite Mass Effect 3's contentious conclusion. Cunningham cited it as one of Mass Effect's greatest character moments and expressed how it singlehandedly changed his perception of Mordin as a character. Ars Technica's Lee Hutchinson viewed Mordin's death scene as a "well-orchestrated key dramatic moment", stating that it conveys a great amount of emotion that is diminished in the alternate version of the scene where Mordin is not present.

Several of the character's quotes have been described as among gaming's best. Gamesradar+ selected the quote "Hard to see big picture behind pile of corpses", while multiple outlets pointed to his final Mass Effect 3 line: "Had to be me. Someone else might have gotten it wrong".

=== Analysis ===
Scholars have analyzed Mordin's loyalty mission through a narratological point of view. Hanna-Riikka Roine brought Mordin's loyalty mission as an example of a narrative in a role-playing video game that invited the player into the "meaning-making process" but did not "create or communicate these processes to the player as such". Kristine Jørgensen maintained it was an example of a "micro-narrative", one of a set of smaller, self-contained narratives that composed Mass Effect 2.

Mordin's arc within the Mass Effect trilogy's broader depiction of the genophage has also been discussed. Eamon Reid examined Mordin's involvement in "developing, enacting, and maintaining the genophage" and later working to cure it, framing him as the character to whom the best possible solution to it is tied. As part of TechRaptor's "Character Select" series, Robert Grosso compared Mordin's approach to religion and philosophy to Friedrich Nietzsche's writings. Grosso contended that Mordin's actions throughout the trilogy adhere to the concept of the Übermensch, causing Mordin to feed his own ego and become unable to admit he had made a mistake until the very end. Grosso added that, in modifying the genophage to be more effective, Mordin adhered to the views of nihilism, as the life of the Krogan had no meaning to him.

=== Merchandise ===
Following the release of Mass Effect 2, DC Direct announced a Mordin Solus statue as a part of the second line of a Mass Effect product line. They were later announced to be releasing concurrently with Mass Effect 3, in March 2012, coming with free in-game content. A bust of the character was also made available in BioWare's online store, and a Mordin Solus plush toy was developed by Sanshee. With the release of Mass Effect: Legendary Edition, several other statues of the character have been created created by BioWare and Dark Horse.
