= Steven Barr =

American actor

- Occupation: Actor
- Years active: 1983–present

Steven Barr is an American actor. He is best known for voicing Urdnot Wrex in the Mass Effect trilogy. Barr also provided additional dialogue for the character Cookie in Atlantis: The Lost Empire after the death of the original voice actor Jim Varney. Barr fully replaced him in the role for the film's sequel, Atlantis: Milo's Return.

== Filmography ==
=== Film ===
Year	Title	Role	Notes
1988	For Keeps?	Sgt. Blaine	
1988	Death House	Agent Crowley	Credited as Steven V. Barr
1989	Big Man on Campus	First Reporter	
1989	B.O.R.N.	Ray	
1992	Memoirs of an Invisible Man	Clellan	
1993	The Criminal Mind	State Trooper Thorpe	
1996	Kazaam	Sam	Credited as Steve Barr
1998	Evasive Action	Joe Manetti	
2000	The Perfect Storm	Commander Brudnicki	Credited as Steve Barr
2001	Southlander	Policeman	Credited as Steve Barr
2001	Atlantis: The Lost Empire	Cookie (voice, additional dialogue)	Credited as Steve Barr
2001	Cowboy Up	Truck Driver	
2003	Atlantis: Milo's Return	Cookie (voice)	Direct-to-video
2006	We Are Marshall	Game Announcer	Credited as Steve Barr
2015	Éxodo	Son (adult) (voice)	Short film
2017	Transformers: The Last Knight	Nitro Zeus, Volleybot, stormreign (voice)	

=== Television ===
Year	Title	Role	Notes
1983	Alice	Ted	Episode: "Alice's Blind Date"
1984	Santa Barbara	Policeman	Episode: "Episode #1.76"
1984	The Kids of Degrassi Street	Uncle Jake	Episode: "Liz Sits the Schlegels"
1985	V	Visitor Judge	Episode: "The Champion"
1985	Knots Landing	Monitor #2	Episode: "Vulnerable"; credited as Steven V. Barr
1985	Remington Steele	Jake Reilly	Episode: "Grappling Steele"
1986	The New Mike Hammer	Brian	Episode: "Deirdre"
1986	Hill Street Blues	Bailiff #2	Episode: "Bald Ambition"; credited as Steven V. Barr
1987–1989	Days of Our Lives	Rip / Lionel T. Bell / Sammy Clyde Pearsons	7 episodes
1988	Hooperman	SWAT Team Member	Episode: "Chariots of Fire"
1988	Matlock	1st Henchman	2 episodes
1988	Night Court	Mr. Higgins	Episode: "Night Court of the Living Dead"
1989	Everybody's Baby: The Rescue of Jessica McClure		Television film
1989	L.A. Law	Steve	Episode: "The Unsterile Cuckoo"
1989	Superior Court	Wesley Barrett	Episode: "State vs. Feather"
1990	Drug Wars: The Camarena Story	INS Cop	3 episodes
1990	Fall from Grace	Bodyguard #1	Television film; credited as Steven V. Barr
1990	The Great Los Angeles Earthquake	Officer Johnson	Television film; credited as Steven V. Barr
1991	The Heroes of Desert Storm		Television film
1992	Beverly Hills, 90210	Don	Episode: "The Back Story"
1993	Step by Step	Announcer	Episode: "The Un-Natural"
1993	Bodies of Evidence	John McCarty	Episode: "Flesh and Blood"
1993	The Mommies	Santa #3	Episode: "Christmas"
1994	Melrose Place	Police Officer	Episode: "The Doctor Who Rocks the Cradle"
1995	Virtual Seduction	Front Gate Guard	Television film
1995	Murder One	Andrew Campagna	Episode: "Chapter Two"
1996	JAG	Deputy Sheriff Terence Hodge	Episode: "Survivors"
1996	Dark Skies	Patrolman	Episode: "Mercury Rising"
1996–2001	Diagnosis: Murder	Bendricks / Dean Stroll	2 episodes
1997	Pacific Blue	Michael Evans	Episode: "Lost and Found"
1997	Arli$$	Ted Higgins	Episode: "The Real Thing"; credited as Steve Barr
1997	L.A. Heat	Officer Bill Wyatt	Episode: "Killing on Lily Lane"; credited as Steve Barr
1997	Team Knight Rider	Husband	Episode: "Oil & Water"
1998	Prey	Det. Masters	Episode: "Discovery"
1998	Teen Angel	Terry	Episode: "The Un-Natural"
1998	To Have & to Hold	Officer Dobson	Episode: "These Boots Were Made for Stalking"
1998	Two Guys, a Girl and a Pizza Place	Man in the park	Episode: "Two Guys, a Girl and a Christmas Story"
1998–1999	Any Day Now		2 episodes
1999	Home Improvement	Coach	Episode: "Trouble-a-Bruin"
1999	Profiler	Robert Lee Gregg	Episode: "What's Love Got to Do with It?"
2000	The X-Files	Courier Guard	Episode: "The Amazing Maleeni"
2000	King of the Hill	Cole (voice)	Episode: "Hank's Bad Hair Day"
2000	Manhattan, AZ	Daniel's Father	Episode: "Jake's Daughter"
2000	The Michael Richards Show	Man	Episode: "Simplification"
2001	Angel	Captain	Episode: "The Thin Dead Line"
2001	The Princess & the Marine	Dale	Television film
2001	Providence	George Blankenship	Episode: "Love Story"
2001	Sabrina the Teenage Witch	Mr. Martin	Episode: "Witchright Hall"
2001	The Division		Episode: "Obsessions"
2001	V.I.P.	Martin	Episode: "South by Southwest"
2001	7th Heaven	Chief	Episode: "Consideration"
2002	The Agency		Episode: "The Golden Hour"
2002	Malcolm in the Middle	Deputy	Episode: "Monkey"
2002	The Jersey	Coach	Episode: "Coleman's Big Date"
2003	Dragnet		Episode: "Sticks and Stones"
2003	Crossing Jordan	Trawlerman	Episode: "Dead Wives' Club"
2003	ER	Construction Foreman	Episode: "When Night Meets Day"
2003	CSI: Crime Scene Investigation	Ranger	Episode: "Fur and Loathing
2005	McBride: Anybody Here Murder Marty?	Detective King	Television film; credited as Steve Barr
2007	Day Break	Hippo	3 episodes
2007	Journeyman		Episode: "A Love of a Lifetime"
2011	Rules of Engagement	P.A. Announcer (voice)	Episode: "Zygote"

=== Video games ===
Year	Title	Role	Notes
2002	Red Faction II	Male 7	Credited as Steve Barr
2003	Brute Force	Brotten	Credited as Steve Barr
2004	EverQuest II	Brashk / Guard Fallsworth / Tsuul Nightfallow	Credited as Steve Barr
2005	EverQuest II: Desert of Flames		Credited as Steve Barr
2006	Rise of Nations: Rise of Legends	Doge	
2007	Mass Effect	Urdnot Wrex	
2009	Dragon Age: Origins	Various voices	
2010	Mass Effect 2	Urdnot Wrex	
2012	Mass Effect 3	Urdnot Wrex	
2013	Mass Effect 3: Citadel	Urdnot Wrex	
2016	World of Final Fantasy	Tonberry	English version
2018	World of Final Fantasy: Maxima	Tonberry	English version
2021	Guilty Gear Strive	Goldlewis Dickinson	English version; credited as Steve Barr
