= Atlantis: Milo's Return =

2003 film

- Home video release poster
- Directed by: Victor Cook; Toby Shelton; Tad Stones
- Screenplay by: Steve Englehart; Thomas Hart; Kevin Hopps; Tad Stones; Marty Isenberg; Henry Gilroy
- Based on: Timaeus; by Plato
- Produced by: Tad Stones
- Starring: James Arnold Taylor; Cree Summer; John Mahoney; Jacqueline Obradors; Don Novello; Corey Burton; Phil Morris; Florence Stanley; Frank Welker; Steve Barr; Clancy Brown; Jean Gilpin; Kai R. Larsen; Bill Fagerbakke; Thomas F. Wilson; Floyd Red Crow Westerman; Jeff Bennett; W. Morgan Sheppard
- Edited by: John Royer
- Music by: Don Harper
- Production companies: Walt Disney Television Animation; Disneytoon Studios
- Distributed by: Buena Vista Home Entertainment (Note: Distributed under the Walt Disney Home Entertainment imprint.)
- Release date: May 20, 2003
- Running time: 70 minutes
- Country: United States
- Language: English

Atlantis: Milo's Return is a 2003 American animated anthology science fantasy action-adventure film, made of unused TV episodes, directed by Victor Cook, Toby Shelton, and Tad Stones. It is the sequel to Atlantis: The Lost Empire (2001). The film received a direct-to-video release on May 20, 2003, to negative reviews.

Originally, Disney was developing a sequel titled Shards of Chaos, but it was abandoned once The Lost Empire was less successful than anticipated. The released sequel consists of three segments, which are "Kraken", "Spirit of the West" and "Spear of Destiny". They were originally meant to be episodes of a series that was never completed called Team Atlantis. Some additional animation was done to link the stories more closely.

Cree Summer (Kida), Corey Burton (Mole), Don Novello (Vinny), Phil Morris (Dr. Sweet), Jacqueline Obradors (Audrey), John Mahoney (Mr. Whitmore), and Florence Stanley (Mrs. Packard) all reprise their roles from the first film, with James Arnold Taylor replacing Michael J. Fox as Milo and Steve Barr replacing Jim Varney, who died before the first film finished production, as Cookie. This is Stanley's final film; she died months after production ended.

== Plot ==
After the decline in Atlantean culture following the sinking, Kida, now queen and married to Milo, who decided to stay in Atlantis, is using the Heart of Atlantis to restore the city's former glory. Milo's comrades and Preston Whitmore arrive in Atlantis; while their arrival is unexpected, the Atlanteans welcome their old friends back into the city. Unfortunately, they have come to inform them of a mysterious creature causing trouble on the surface. Kida suspects that the creature might be Atlantean, stirring mixed feelings about her father's decision to keep the crystal hidden.

They arrive in Trondheim, Norway and discover that the mysterious problem is actually the creature known as the Kraken, which had been attacking shipping freighters and taking their cargo to a cliffside village. At first they presume it to be an ancient Atlantean war machine, but they discover that the town magistrate, Edgar Volgud, seems to be controlling the Kraken. They soon learn, though, that the Kraken itself is the master, having made a deal with Volgud to preserve the life of the town and Volgud's lifespan in exchange for their souls. When they blow up the Kraken, Volgud's immortality ceases and he disintegrates, while the spirit of the village is restored.

All the while, Kida is learning about the outside world and is adapting well. However, she still feels guilty, as there could still be other Atlantean war machines in the world causing problems. Their next mystery is in the Southwestern United States, involving coyote spirits. They later find a hidden city in Arizona that contains Atlantean architecture, which Kida realizes is an abandoned Atlantean colony. A sly shop owner, Ashtin Carnaby, intends to pillage the place for its valuables, but the spirits then turn him into one of them. The wind spirit Chakashi trusts them with the knowledge of their sanctuary and informs Kida that she can choose Atlantis' destiny.

Returning home, the adventurers discover that one of Whitmore's old competitors, Erik Hellstrom, who went insane believing he was Odin, the Norse king of the gods, after a stock market crash sank his company, broke in at night and stole one of Whitmore's possessions, an ancient spear called the Gungnir, an artifact of Atlantean origin. When they track him down in the Nordic Mountains, he presumes Milo to be the god Loki and Kida to be his long-lost daughter Brunhild. Then, "Odin" uses the spear to cast Milo, Mole, Vinny and Audrey out of "Asgard" before kidnapping Kida and dressing her in Norse clothing. He explains that his intentions are to end the world in Ragnarök, the prophesied apocalypse told in Norse mythology. He creates a lava beast and an ice beast to destroy the world, but Vinny distracts the monsters long enough for Kida to retrieve the spear and vanquish the beasts.

During these escapades, Kida comes into a greater understanding of just how powerful the crystal is, and that she must choose between hiding it and sharing it with the rest of mankind. Having retrieved the spear, Kida realizes her father was wrong to hide the crystal from mankind. She combines the Spear with the Heart and lifts Atlantis above the water. Whitmore narrates that from then on, the world was a better place.

== Cast ==
A number of the original cast returned to voice their characters, however Michael J. Fox did not resume his role and was replaced by James Arnold Taylor as the voice of Milo. Additionally Steve Barr took over the role of Cookie in this film after Jim Varney died during production on the first film.

- James Arnold Taylor as Milo
- Cree Summer as Kida
- John Mahoney as Whitmore
- Jacqueline Obradors as Audrey
- Don Novello as Vinny
- Corey Burton as Mole
- Phil Morris as Dr. Sweet
- Florence Stanley as Mrs. Packard
- Frank Welker as Obby / Mantell
- Steve Barr as Cookie
- Clancy Brown as Volgud
- Jean Gilpin as Inger Allyson
- Kai Larsen as Seaman
- Bill Fagerbakke as Sven
- Tom Wilson as Carnaby
- Floyd Westerman as Chakashi
- Jeff Bennett as Sam McKeane
- Morgan Sheppard as Erik Hellstrom

== Reception ==
Empire magazine rated it 2 out of 5, and called it "Another soulless sequel from Disney." They describe the artwork as basic and economical, the Scooby-Doo style stories as vapid, and the dialogue as terribly preachy and insufferably monotonous.

== Team Atlantis television series ==
=== Unmade episodes ===
The series would have featured episodes with different legends incorporated, such as Puck, the Loch Ness Monster, and the Terracotta Warriors.

According to James Arnold Taylor, he said that the show would have been either 18 or 24 episodes long.

=== The Last ===
One of the episodes of Team Atlantis that was never animated featured an appearance by Demona from Gargoyles. It introduced the hunter known as Fiona Canmore, known friend to Dr. Sweet. The episode would have Demona using the Praying Gargoyle statue to bring Gargoyle statues in Paris alive to kill the local humans.

Scripts and voice recording of the episode can be seen at The Gathering conventions. Marina Sirtis reprises her role as Demona, and Fiona Canmore is voiced by Sheena Easton. Greg Weisman, who wrote the episode, planned to use the story for the Gargoyles comic book series. He said if he is unable to use the Atlantis characters, then he will use analogs for the story.

Weisman has stated that while the episode "The Last" is canon in the Gargoyles universe, Team Atlantis as a whole is not. In fact, the Team Atlantis interpretations of the Loch Ness Monster and Puck differ from those seen in Gargoyles.
