= Mass Effect 3 =

2012 video game

- Developer: BioWare (Note: Ported to Wii U by Straight Right)
- Publisher: Electronic Arts
- Director: Casey Hudson
- Producer: Jesse Houston
- Designer: Preston Watamaniuk
- Programmer: David Falkner
- Artist: Derek Watts
- Writer: Mac Walters
- Composers: Sascha Dikiciyan; Sam Hulick; Christopher Lennertz; Clint Mansell; Cris Velasco
- Series: Mass Effect
- Engine: Unreal Engine 3
- Platforms: Windows; Xbox 360; PlayStation 3; Wii U
- Release: March 6, 2012: Windows, PlayStation 3, Xbox 360; NA: March 6, 2012; AU: March 8, 2012; EU: March 9, 2012 Wii U; NA: November 18, 2012; PAL: November 30, 2012
- Genres: Action role-playing, third-person shooter
- Modes: Single-player, multiplayer

Mass Effect 3 is a 2012 action role-playing game developed by BioWare and published by Electronic Arts. The third major entry in the Mass Effect series and the final installment of the original trilogy, it was released in March 2012 for Windows, Xbox 360, and PlayStation 3. A Wii U version of the game, entitled Mass Effect 3: Special Edition, was later released as a launch title on November 18, 2012, which notably supported Nintendo Network connection features for multiplayer interaction. The game is set within the Milky Way galaxy in 2186, where galactic civilization is invaded by a very advanced machine race of synthetic-organic starships known as Reapers.

Similar to Mass Effect 2, the player can import a completed saved game into Mass Effect 3 that influences the plot by taking previous decisions into account. In general, Mass Effect 3 revolves around increasing military strength by completing missions and gathering resources. As BioWare designed the game to be accessible to both old and new players, many of the series' traditional gameplay elements remain, such as cover-based third-person shooting, but new aspects are introduced as well. Players can now switch between various tactical loadouts on the fly, and a new multiplayer component was added to the experience. The game's score was written by a variety of composers, who aimed for a balance between the orchestral sound of Mass Effect 2 and the synthesizer-driven sound of the first Mass Effect. Mass Effect 3 also supports a variety of downloadable content packs, ranging from minor in-game items to more significant plot-related missions. Notable packs include From Ashes, Leviathan, Omega, and Citadel.

Mass Effect 3 received critical acclaim for its art direction, characters, emotional depth, improved combat, soundtrack, and voice acting. However, its ending was poorly received by fans, who felt that it did not meet expectations. In response to the controversy, BioWare released the Extended Cut pack, which expands upon the original ending. The game received several year-end awards, including Best RPG at the Spike Video Game Awards and the D.I.C.E. Award for Role-Playing Game of the Year. Like its predecessors, it has been considered one of the greatest video games ever made. A standalone sequel, Mass Effect: Andromeda, was released in March 2017. In May 2021, Mass Effect 3 was remastered as part of the Mass Effect Legendary Edition.

== Gameplay ==
Mass Effect 3 is an action role-playing game in which the player takes control of Commander Shepard from a third-person perspective. Shepard's gender, appearance, military background, combat training, and first name are determined by the player before the game begins. If the player has a completed saved game from Mass Effect 2, the character from that game can be imported. By importing an old character, decisions from prior Mass Effect titles are carried over, which impacts the plot of Mass Effect 3. Similar to previous installments in the series, the player is able to choose from six different character classes that each have their own unique set of skills. For example, the Infiltrator class is proficient in stealth and sniping abilities whereas biotics-inclined classes possess psychokinetic powers. By completing assignments and quests, the player is rewarded with experience points. Once enough points are earned, Shepard levels up, which allows for the unlocking or upgrading of skills along a tree.

Mass Effect 3 has three pre-set campaign modes: Action, Story, and RPG. In Action Mode, conversations have automatic replies and normal combat difficulty; in Story Mode, conversations have manual replies and minimal combat difficulty; and in RPG Mode, conversations have manual replies and normal combat difficulty. The game contains various role-playing elements, such as the ability to augment guns with different ammo types, barrels, modifications, and scopes to improve their effectiveness in combat. If the player has Kinect, customization choices can be made verbally instead of selected using a controller. Upon beating the game, a New Game+ is unlocked, which allows the player to restart with certain bonuses, such as the ability to further upgrade weapons.

The primary mode of transportation in Mass Effect 3 is a star ship called Normandy SR-2. From the inside of the ship, players can use a galaxy map to choose a destination point, scan planets for resources, or start missions. To aid the player in managing tasks, the game automatically logs available missions in a journal; however, unlike previous titles in the series, the journal does not distinguish between main quests and side quests. In general, Mass Effect 3 revolves around increasing "Effective Military Strength" (EMS) to prepare for its final mission. EMS is calculated by multiplying "Total Military Strength" (TMS) and "Readiness Rating" (RR). TMS is increased by acquiring "War Assets", which include accomplishments from all three Mass Effect games, whereas RR is increased by playing the multiplayer mode.

=== Dialogue and morality ===
Unless it is set to Action Mode, the player interacts with non-player characters in Mass Effect 3 by using a radial command menu where dialogue options depend on wheel direction. Most conversations are advanced by choosing either a Paragon (diplomatic) or Renegade (intimidating) option, which appear to the top and bottom right of the wheel, respectively. By conversing with squadmates aboard the Normandy, Commander Shepard can develop friendships or, in some cases, romantic relationships with them over time. Same-sex relationships for both female and male Shepards are available. If Shepard was imported from Mass Effect 2 and achieved a love interest in each of the prior Mass Effect games, then both characters vie for Shepard's attention in Mass Effect 3. During some conversations, the player is prompted with a context-sensitive interrupt option that offers a temporary alternative to what is available on the dialogue wheel.

On several occasions, the player must make decisions that impact the game's narrative. For example, one mission asks the player to side with one of two species, which can lead to one of them being eradicated. Over the course of Mass Effect 3, dialogue and narrative decisions result in "Reputation Points", which are added together and unlock further decision-making and dialogue options as they accumulate. The conclusion of the game is influenced by accomplishments earned and decisions made throughout the series.

=== Combat ===
During combat, players can take cover behind objects on the battlefield. The user interface includes ammunition, health bars, and powers.

Combat in Mass Effect 3 takes place in real-time but also allows for pausing to aim, change weapons, or use skills from a menu. During battle, the player has direct control of Commander Shepard from an over-the-shoulder perspective, who can move around the map by climbing up ladders, combat rolling, or sprinting. Shepard is typically accompanied by two squad members who are controlled by the game's artificial intelligence; however, the player can still order them into position or choose their powers. Kinect users are able to issue these commands verbally. If squad members die, they can be revived using the Unity power or an on-screen prompt if the player is in close proximity.

Enemy encounters generally involve navigating opposing forces that work together and support each other with varying roles. For example, a typical confrontation involves defeating suppressor-type enemies who shoot from afar while also managing more aggressive enemies that are constantly charging. To avoid taking damage, the player can go into cover behind objects on the battlefield, but harder difficulties necessitate that players stay mobile as well. If Shepard or the squad members are hit, damage is dealt to their shields until they run out, at which point a final layer of health is gradually depleted until the individual dies, health is restored, or shields regenerate.

Opposing forces are damaged with gunfire, melee attacks, or specialized skills such as combat drones. If desired, the melee system can be a vital aspect of gameplay. For example, players can execute heavy melee attacks that vary depending on character class. All enemies have protections that are susceptible to particular attack types, such as armor, which is weak against the Incinerate skill and weapons with a slow rate of fire. Sometimes, the player is presented with alternate offensive approaches. For example, if the player encounters an Atlas Mech and defeats its driver without destroying the entire suit, Shepard can climb inside and take control of its heavy-duty weaponry.

=== Multiplayer ===
Mass Effect 3 includes a multiplayer mode called "Galaxy at War". In this mode, up to four players join to complete horde-style cooperative matches in which the participants must survive escalating waves of enemies and complete a series of objectives. As rounds are completed, the player earns in-game currency that is used to buy randomly-generated packs of unlockables, such as new character types and weapons. In-game currency is also available via microtransaction. For the first year of the mode's existence, players could participate in BioWare-sponsored challenges with special objectives and increased rewards.

In contrast to the single-player mode, where the player can only play as a human, the multiplayer mode has a wider variety of species to choose from. Every race has unique powers, such as a "Krogan Charge" for krogans. Combat is based on its single-player counterpart but has some differences such as no pause menu to change weapons; instead, weapons are changed by holding down a button. Frequency of play and number of multiplayer missions completed affect the outcome of the single-player campaign.

== Synopsis ==
=== Setting ===
The Mass Effect trilogy is set within the Milky Way galaxy during the 22nd century, where interstellar travel is possible through the use of mass transit devices called mass relays, a technology believed to have been built by an extinct alien race known as the Protheans. A conglomerate body of governments known as the Citadel Council controls a large percentage of the galaxy and is responsible for maintaining law and order among races of the galactic community. Races that belong to the Citadel Council include humans, Asari, Salarians and Turians. Other alien races include the warlike reptilian Krogan, the nomadic environmental suited Quarians, and their wayward creations, a race of networked artificial intelligences known as the Geth.

Mass Effect 3 begins in 2186, six months after the events of Mass Effect 2. The galactic community lives in fear of an invasion by Reapers, a highly advanced machine race of synthetic-organic starships that are believed to eradicate all organic civilization every 50,000 years. Meanwhile, the krogan face extinction because of the genophage, a genetic mutation developed by the Salarians and deployed by the Turians as a bioweapon to contain the Krogan; the Quarians prepare to retake their homeworld from the Geth; and the human supremacist terrorist organization Cerberus is regrouping after a temporary alliance with Commander Shepard to defeat the Collectors, indoctrinated and genetically modified remnants of the Prothean race who were abducting human colonies. Shepard has been relieved of duty and is confined on Earth, awaiting court-martial by the Systems Alliance.

=== Characters ===
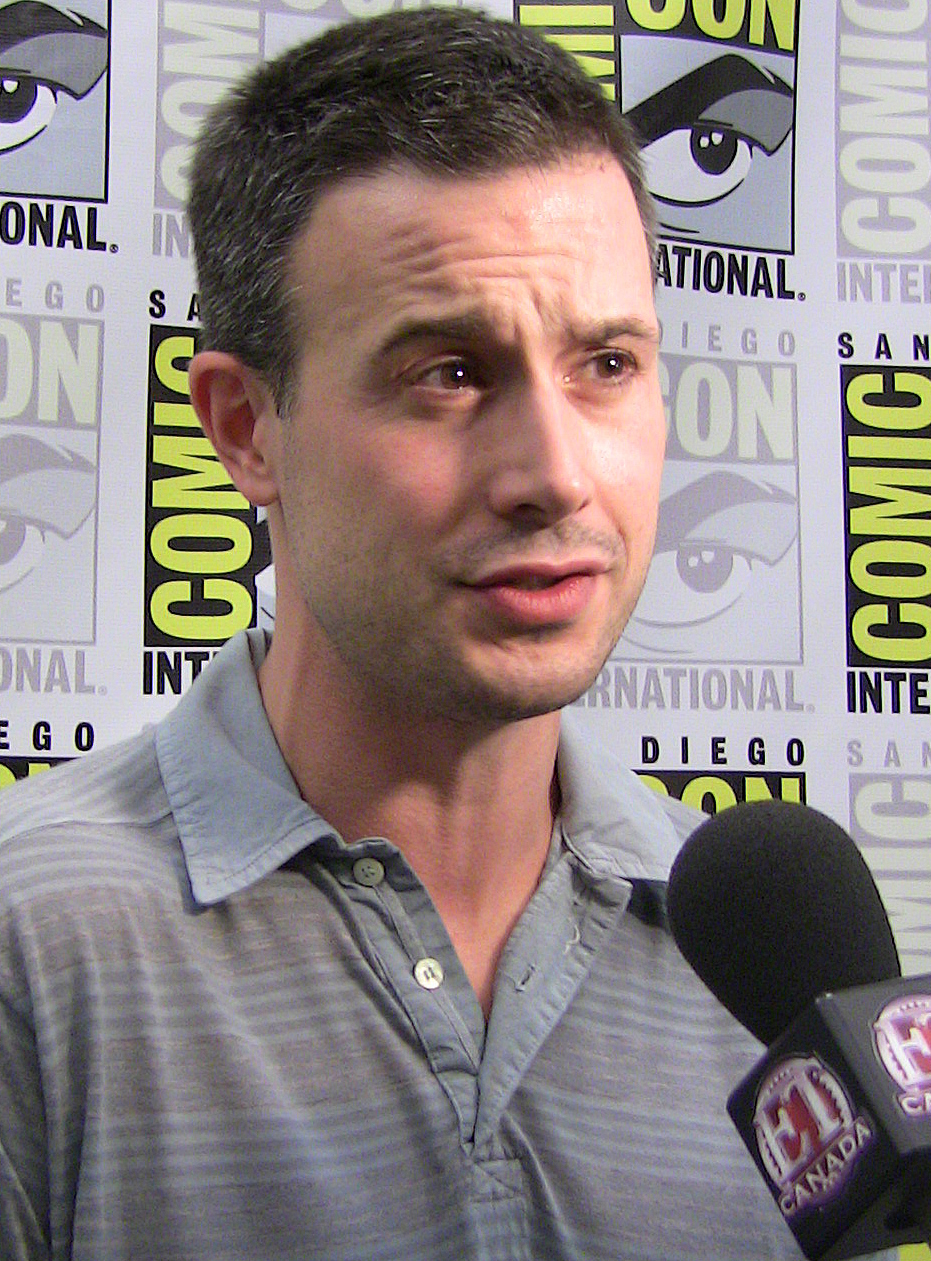
Freddie Prinze Jr. joined the cast of Mass Effect 3 as James Vega.

The protagonist of Mass Effect 3 is Commander Shepard (Mark Meer or Jennifer Hale), an elite human soldier who is Commanding Officer of the Normandy SR-2 starship. While the exact roster can vary, Shepard's squad members generally include Systems Alliance officers Ashley Williams (Kimberly Brooks) or Kaidan Alenko (Raphael Sbarge), Systems Alliance marine James Vega (Freddie Prinze Jr.), Asari information broker and researcher Liara T'Soni (Ali Hillis), Turian military adviser Garrus Vakarian (Brandon Keener), the Normandy's artificial intelligence EDI (Tricia Helfer), and Quarian engineer Tali'Zorah (Ash Sroka). The Prothean endling Javik (Ike Amadi) is included as an optional squad member by default with the Wii U version of the game. Other characters include Systems Alliance admirals David Anderson (Keith David) and Steven Hackett (Lance Henriksen), Normandy pilot Jeff "Joker" Moreau (Seth Green), Cerberus leader the Illusive Man (Martin Sheen), Cerberus assassin Kai Leng (Troy Baker), Citadel Security (C-Sec) Commander Armando-Owen Bailey (Michael Hogan), and Asari crime boss Aria T'Loak (Carrie-Anne Moss).

Certain characters such as human Cerberus officer Miranda Lawson (Yvonne Strahovski), Salarian scientist Mordin Solus (William Salyers), Krogan leader Urdnot Wrex (Steven Barr), human criminal Jack (Courtenay Taylor), genetically engineered Krogan soldier Grunt (Steve Blum), Drell assassin Thane Krios (Keythe Farley), Asari Justicar Samara (Maggie Baird), and Geth mobile platform Legion (D. C. Douglas) may appear depending on whether or not they survived the events of previous games. If necessary, the game establishes alternate characters as replacements for previously-deceased characters who otherwise would have significant roles in the plot; for example, Urdnot Wreav will emerge as the Krogan leader instead of Urdnot Wrex, Padok Wiks will appear instead of Mordin as the Salarian scientist working to cure the genophage, and a facsimile of Legion occupied by a Geth virtual intelligence (VI) will be encountered by Shepard if Legion is unable to appear.

=== Plot ===
The Reapers invade and quickly overwhelm Earth. After being reinstated by Anderson, who stays behind to rally resistance, Shepard is ordered to Mars by Hackett. There, Shepard learns of a Prothean superweapon capable of destroying the Reapers, and recovers its schematics from the Illusive Man, who reveals Cerberus' desire to control the Reapers instead. With schematics in hand, the Alliance begins construction on the device, dubbed the "Crucible", while Shepard is ordered to recruit support from other species across the galaxy.

Shepard begins by rescuing the Turian primarch from Menae, a moon orbiting the Turian homeworld, Palaven. The primarch pledges Turian support to Shepard only if the Krogan help defend Palaven, but the Krogan leader refuses to help unless the genophage is cured. Shepard and the Krogan leader travel to the Salarian homeworld, Sur'Kesh, where they rendezvous with a Salarian scientist who formulates a cure from Eve, a fertile Krogan female, and plans to disperse it using a tower called the "Shroud" on the Krogan homeworld, Tuchanka. Before landing on Tuchanka, Shepard is contacted by the leader of the Salarian government, who reveals that the Shroud has been sabotaged to prevent the dispersal of a cure, and offers her government's support only if the sabotage is left intact. Shepard must ultimately decide whether to allow the cure to proceed, in which case the Salarian scientist sacrifices himself to deploy a counter-measure, resulting in a pledge of support from the Krogan. Alternatively, Shepard may deceive the Krogan into thinking that the genophage has been cured, thereby earning both Krogan and Salarian support.

Following the events on Tuchanka and a failed coup by Cerberus to take over the Citadel, the quarians offer their support to the Alliance if Shepard helps them reclaim their homeworld, Rannoch, from the Geth. Shepard boards a Geth dreadnought, rescues a captive Geth ally, and disables the Reaper control signal over the Geth. Shepard then locates and destroys a Reaper base on Rannoch, which gives the Quarians an opportunity to attack the vulnerable Geth. However, the allied Geth unit reveals that it intends to sacrifice itself in order to upgrade the Geth using Reaper technology, which empowers the Geth to defeat the Quarians and enable them to achieve true sentience and free will. Shepard either supports one faction by allowing them to exterminate the other, or negotiates a ceasefire to gain support from both sides.

Shepard is subsequently summoned to the Citadel by the Asari councilor. She reveals that there is a hidden Prothean artifact on the Asari homeworld, Thessia, which may help Shepard identify the "Catalyst", an essential component for completing the Crucible. There, Shepard discovers a Prothean VI called "Vendetta", but Kai Leng arrives and steals it as Thessia falls to the Reapers. Desperate to reclaim Vendetta, Shepard's crew follow Leng to the Sanctuary facility on the human colony world Horizon, where Cerberus has been secretly researching Reaper-control technology. Shepard obtains a tracking device that leads to the Illusive Man's headquarters, and initiates an all-out assault on the base with the Alliance. Shepard reaches the central base, kills Leng, and learns from Vendetta that the Catalyst is the Citadel itself, which the Reapers have captured after successfully indoctrinating the Illusive Man, who abandoned the station prior to the assault.

The Alliance and its allies launch an all-out assault on the Reapers in a last-ditch effort to retake Earth. Shepard and Anderson eventually enter the Citadel through a Reaper transportation beam, where they encounter the Illusive Man; only Shepard survives the ensuing confrontation. Shepard attempts to activate the Crucible, but is instead lifted to the Citadel's pinnacle, and meets a childlike artificial intelligence that declares itself to be the Catalyst. The Catalyst reveals that it originally created the Reapers to prevent synthetic life from destroying organic life by periodically culling civilizations that had grown advanced enough to develop synthetic life. Having conceded defeat to Shepard, it presents up to three options for activating the Crucible: "Destroy" all synthetic life in the galaxy; "Control" the Reapers by uploading Shepard's consciousness to become the new Catalyst; or alter all life into organic-synthetic hybrids via "Synthesis" which render the Reapers obsolete. An additional ending, which unfolds if Shepard attacks or refuses the Catalyst, is possible if the Extended Cut downloadable content (DLC) is installed.

The ultimate fates of Shepard, the Normandy crew, Earth, and the rest of the galaxy depend on the player's choice in dealing with the Catalyst as well as their final EMS score.

== Development ==
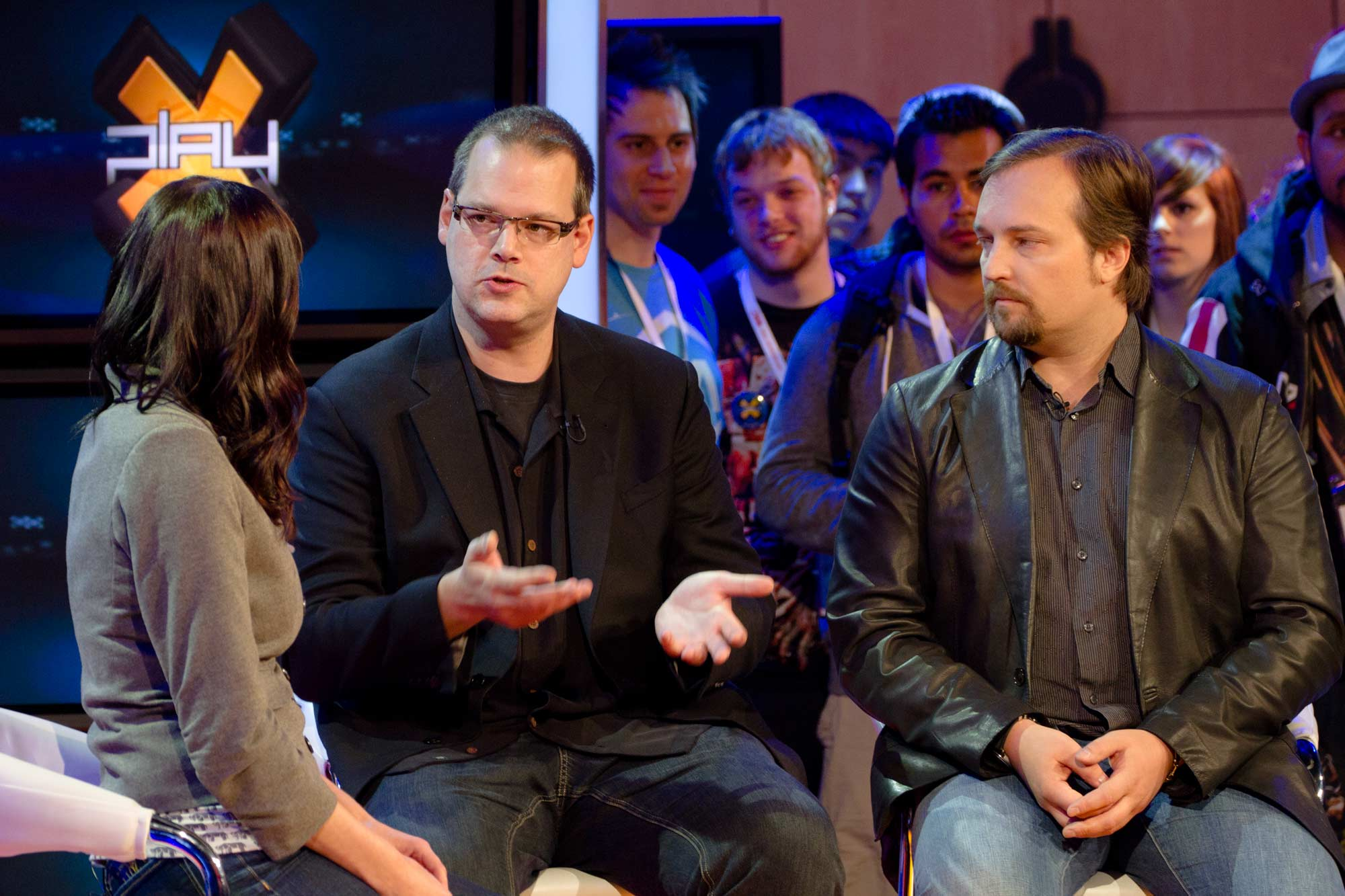
BioWare co-founders Ray Muzyka and Greg Zeschuk envisioned Mass Effect 3 as accessible to new and returning players alike.

Mass Effect 3 was developed by BioWare and published by Electronic Arts (EA). Similar to previous installments in the series, the game was directed by Casey Hudson, who originally created the franchise along with BioWare founders Greg Zeschuk and Ray Muzyka. It was the first game in the franchise without the involvement of Microsoft Game Studios, the original publisher of the first two titles and BioWare's long-time partner.

=== Production ===
Early stages of development on Mass Effect 3 began before Mass Effect 2 was released. Because Mass Effect 3 was designed for consoles that were nearing the end of their lifespans, BioWare focused more on optimizing gameplay and storytelling than pushing the technology forward. Throughout the design process, the company referenced critical feedback to help guide their creative decisions, an approach they also utilized for Mass Effect 2. For example, many fans complained that role-playing systems in Mass Effect 2 were oversimplified, so BioWare added back more character customization options. Another major strategy was to make Mass Effect 3 more user-friendly for new players, something that BioWare felt they did a bad job of in Mass Effect 2.

One of Hudson's primary goals for the single-player campaign was to improve combat, hoping to turn Mass Effect 3 into one of the best shooters on the market. BioWare tried to accomplish this by improving enemy animations and diversity, including specialized enemies that would require players to utilize different tactics based on character class. The company also aimed to make the battlefield less predictable by introducing unexpected events and redirects, such as the floor giving out and the player falling to a completely different level of the environment, so that enemy encounters would not always go as telegraphed.

Mass Effect 3 required over 40,000 lines of dialogue. By comparison, the original Mass Effect featured approximately 20,000 lines while Mass Effect 2 featured 25,000. Because of the game's extensive voice cast, it was logistically impossible for BioWare to have every actor in a single location at one time. Caroline Livingstone, who served as voiceover director, coordinated recording sessions from Edmonton while the actors worked remotely. BioWare noted that this approach, combined with the sheer volume of dialogue, made it difficult to consistently capture the proper intonation and volume of each line. To help reduce these kinds of errors, they developed their own technology, such as the "Intensity Volume Matrix", which listed out each line and the appropriate tone associated with it.

The music of Mass Effect 3 was composed by Sasha Dikicyan, Sam Hulick, Christopher Lennertz, Clint Mansell, and Cris Velasco. Everyone except for Mansell was a returning composer; Hulick contributed to the first two games and Dikicyan, Lennertz, and Velasco scored some Mass Effect 2 downloadable content packs. Jack Wall, the lead composer of Mass Effect and Mass Effect 2, had no involvement in the production of Mass Effect 3. Each composer was allocated a specific area of the game to work on, and in total there were 90 minutes of music scored. According to Hulick, the team aimed for a balance between the orchestral sound of Mass Effect 2 and the synthesizer-driven sound of Mass Effect. Mansell, a Golden Globe Award-nominated composer, likened his role to that of a disc jockey, who is responsible for choosing the right music at the right times.

Although Mass Effect 3 was originally planned as a project that could be finished in under two years, by March 2011, it was clear that more development time was required, so BioWare moved the game's release date from Q4 2011 to Q1 2012. In order to meet this deadline, the company also made some concessions, such as the removal of a new, Prothean squad mate from the base game. The game was officially approved for distribution, making it effectively finished, in February 2012.

=== Writing ===
Mac Walters, who served as co-lead writer on Mass Effect 2 with Drew Karpyshyn, was the lead writer for Mass Effect 3. Karpyshyn departed from the series after Mass Effect 2 to work on Star Wars: The Old Republic. Hudson and Walters began the writing process by collaborating on a short story document that outlined all primary plot points. These high-level ideas were then disbursed to the rest of the team, who were each put in charge of specific character and story arcs. Staff members were also responsible for peer reviewing each other's work. Because prior games allowed players to choose from different outcomes, the writers had to account for many possible variables; however, in anticipation of this challenge, they preemptively locked in certain story arcs to ensure that all Mass Effect 3 playthroughs had at least some commonalities.

Mass Effect 3 offers expanded content, in comparison to prior entries in the series, for players who are interested in having their Shepard pursue same-sex relationships with non-player characters. Kaidan, who was previously only available as a heterosexual romance option for a female Shepard, is retroactively established as a bisexual character who can, at the player's discretion, become a male Shepard's love interest. It is also the first game of the series to offer an exclusively gay male and lesbian romance option, with shuttlecraft pilot Steve Cortez and communications specialist Samantha Traynor, respectively. Cortez was written by Dusty Everman, who approached the romance arc as a meaningful human relationship that just happens to be between two men. Traynor's story arc is framed as a lighthearted fish out of water situation by Trick Weekes, whose character work for Traynor is predominantly about a civilian technician trying to adjust to life in a military environment, as opposed to her sexual orientation and attraction to feminine qualities.

The overall narrative of Mass Effect 3 went through multiple redrafts before being finalized, and a number of ending sequences involving the Reapers were considered but ultimately abandoned. In November 2011, a private beta of Mass Effect 3 was leaked onto Xbox Live, which allowed players to access unreleased plot details, and forced BioWare to alter some aspects of the story at the last minute.

== Marketing and release ==
Mass Effect 3 was officially announced on December 11, 2010, at the Spike Video Game Awards. The following summer, the game was demoed and unveiled at conventions such as Comic-Con, Electronic Entertainment Expo, Gamescon, and PAX Prime. A multiplayer component was officially announced on October 10, 2011, confirming longstanding fan rumors of a multiplayer mode dating back to 2010. An official single-player demo was released on February 14, 2012, with early access granted to consumers who purchased Battlefield 3 and activated their online pass.

Leading to its release, Mass Effect 3 was promoted with a variety of video content, beginning with a reveal trailer in 2010 and ending with a teaser trailer called Take Back Earth in 2012. BioWare also utilized viral marketing such as fictional blogs and a weekly web series called BioWare Pulse. For one promotional campaign, EA launched early copies of Mass Effect 3 into space using weather balloons that were equipped with GPS devices. Fans were able to track the balloons online and then recover them once they landed, which enabled them to obtain early copies of the game. Throughout its marketing cycle, Mass Effect 3 was subject to numerous leaks; most significantly, a private beta unintentionally became available to players on Xbox Live in November 2011.

Unlike Mass Effect and Mass Effect 2, BioWare promoted Mass Effect 3 with both male and female versions of Commander Shepard. Colloquially referred to as "FemShep", the female Shepard had her own dedicated trailers and appeared on the cover of some versions of the game, including the standard version, which featured a reversible slipcase insert with FemShep on one side. To help decide the official FemShep model, BioWare asked fans to choose between five prototypes on Facebook. Ultimately, the fifth prototype won and a new fan vote was held to decide its hair color, which became red.

In addition to the standard version of Mass Effect 3, players could also purchase a Collector's Edition and Digital Deluxe Edition, which included in-game bonuses and unlockable items. The Digital Deluxe Edition was exclusively available through Origin, EA's online distribution and digital rights management system. The game also came with various pre-order bonuses depending on where the order was made. For example, those who pre-ordered the game from the PlayStation Network were granted the M-55 Argus assault weapon and Mass Effect 3 PlayStation theme.

Mass Effect 3 was originally scheduled for release in late 2011, but its official release date was eventually moved to March 6, 2012. Initially, the game was only released for Windows, Xbox 360, and PlayStation 3. All new copies of the game came with an online pass that granted access to the multiplayer mode, but used copies generally required that a new pass be purchased. In order to run Mass Effect 3 on PC, players were required to install Origin. On November 18, 2012, a Wii U version of the game was released in North America, followed by releases in Europe and Australia on November 30 and Japan on December 6. It was ported by Australian developer Straight Right. Along with Mass Effect 2, Mass Effect 3 became backwards compatible with Xbox One on November 7, 2016. A remaster of the Mass Effect trilogy, entitled Mass Effect Legendary Edition, was released for Windows, PlayStation 4, and Xbox One on May 14, 2021.

=== Downloadable content ===
A variety of downloadable content packs for Mass Effect 3 were released between March 2012 and April 2013. The content ranges from minor in-game items to more significant plot-related missions. One pack, Extended Cut, expands upon the game's original endings with an additional choice to attack or refuse the Catalyst; this results in a Reaper victory over the current cycle of organic civilizations. The pack also supplements each of the three main endings with an epilogue and elaborates upon other aspects of the conclusion. For example, whereas the original ending shows the Normandy SR-2 trying to outrun the blast from the Crucible, it does not elaborate on why the Normandy is fleeing from battle in the first place. In Extended Cut, a scene with Admiral Hackett ordering an evacuation is added.

Other major packs include From Ashes, which adds Javik as a squadmate; Leviathan, which follows the crew of the Normandy as they investigate the Reapers' origins; Omega, which involves Shepard retaking the space station Omega alongside Aria T'Loak, its former ruler, from Cerberus; and Citadel, which follows the crew of the Normandy on shore leave. An interactive comic called Genesis 2 is also available for purchase and allows players to quickly customize important story decisions on the spot instead of having to replay prior installments. The Wii U version of the game includes Genesis 2 and From Ashes. Of all the packs, Citadel was the best-received, and both Leviathan and Citadel were nominated for Best DLC at the Spike Video Game Awards during their respective years of release (2012 and 2013).

== Reception ==
=== Critical response ===
Reception

Aggregate score
Aggregator	Score
Metacritic	(PC) 89/100 (X360) 93/100 (PS3) 93/100 (WIIU) 85/100

Review scores
Publication	Score
1Up.com	A
Edge	8/10
Eurogamer	10/10
G4	5/5
Game Informer	10/10
GameSpot	9.0/10
GameTrailers	9.5/10
IGN	9.5/10
Official Xbox Magazine (UK)	10/10
PC Gamer (US)	93/100

Upon release, the Xbox 360 and PlayStation 3 versions of Mass Effect 3 received "universal acclaim" while the Windows and Wii U versions received "generally favorable reviews" from video game publications, according to review aggregator Metacritic. The Xbox 360 and PlayStation 3 versions of the game finished with scores of 93 out of 100, making Mass Effect 3 the highest-rated game of 2012 on both systems.

Critics felt that Mass Effect 3 was a satisfying conclusion to the Mass Effect trilogy. In a perfect review for Eurogamer, Dan Whitehead praised the game for providing a definitive close to the saga instead of something more ambiguous or open-ended. Writing for Game Informer, Andrew Reiner proclaimed that BioWare had created one of the most "intricately crafted" stories in the history of video gaming. Tom Francis of PC Gamer (US) remarked that the finale was a "mixed bag", but ultimately praised its scale and emotional impact, which he felt was more satisfying than its main plot.

Reviewers highlighted the experience of playing Mass Effect 3 with an imported saved game. In a piece for Polygon, Arthur Gies opined that, while the game would be engaging without any previous context, it would be more meaningful for players who also played through Mass Effect and Mass Effect 2. Gus Mastrapa of The A.V. Club echoed these sentiments and praised Mass Effect 3 for allotting each player a degree of flexibility over their choices and the direction of the narrative. By contrast, Edge felt that Mass Effect 3 relied too heavily on events from prior games, which stopped it from standing up as its own work.

The combat system and multiplayer mode received praise. Discussing combat for IGN, Colin Moriarty observed that while changes from prior installments were minor, they were still evident, and anticipated that multiplayer would give the game added replay value. While Game Informer noted that combat was not perfect, they were still positive and concluded that enemy encounters were more intense and interesting than in Mass Effect 2, due in part to a greater variety in environment and enemy types. In an otherwise enthusiastic write-up for GameSpot, Kevin VanOrd recounted numerous glitches during combat, such as party members putting themselves in the line of fire by climbing onto crates and enemies getting stuck on walls. Machinima also noted numerous bugs, but relented that Mass Effect 3 was still a memorable experience, citing the game's strong characters as compensation for its flaws.

Other aspects of Mass Effect 3 to receive praise included its art design, music, and voice acting. GameSpot described the art design as "fantastic" and gave particular attention to its use of color and composition. In that same review, the website complimented the game's voice acting for bringing its major characters to life. PC Gamer (US) made special mention of the game's music, calling it "gorgeous" and observing that it significantly added to the emotional impact of the game. The Verge went a step further and described the score as one of the most "powerful and memorable" ever created for a video game. Kirk Hamilton of Kotaku felt that the score represented some of the best video game music of 2012.

=== Controversies ===
==== Ending ====
The ending of Mass Effect 3 was poorly received by players, who felt that it did not meet their expectations. Displeased fans organized an internet campaign called "Retake Mass Effect" to demand a better ending to the game, part of which included a charity drive for the organization Child's Play. Public outcry over the game's outcome drew conflicting responses from organizations such as the US-based Better Business Bureau and Federal Trade Commission as well as the UK-based Advertising Standards Authority (ASA) as to whether BioWare had engaged in false advertising and misled consumers under existing law. On April 5, 2012, BioWare announced a free DLC pack that would expand upon the ending and address criticism. The expansion, Extended Cut, was released for most platforms on June 26, 2012. Critical and fan reaction towards the pack was generally mixed.

==== Other controversies ====
Some fans and special interest groups vocally objected to the inclusion of expanded same sex romance options for Shepard. Kevin VanOrd of GameSpot and Craig Takeuchi of the Georgia Straight highlighted instances of dismissive comments against the game's same-sex relationship content which were posted on several websites in their respective articles. Queerty suggested that some of the user-generated comments posted on Metacritic were indicative of a review bomb movement to intentionally lower the game's user rating in response to the romance content. In April 2012, Jeff Brown, VP of corporate communications at EA, claimed that his company was inundated by "several thousand" letters and emails protesting the inclusion of LGBT content in the video games it publishes like Mass Effect 3. EA issued a statement denying that it came under pressure by any groups to include LGBT characters in their games, but acknowledged that it has voluntarily worked with pro-LGBT groups to discuss appropriate content as well as the harassment of players in online forums. James Brightman of Gameindustry.biz noted that many of the letters appeared to have originated from addresses in the US State of Florida and were likely coordinated by local anti-LGBT groups based there.

Other noteworthy controversies surrounding Mass Effect 3 included accusations of questionable business practices over the decision to release From Ashes as paid day one DLC; allegations of conflict of interest involving the casting of video game media personality Jessica Chobot as an in-game character named Diana Allers; the creative decision to utilize a stock photo as the basis of Tali's face; and the online poll to determine the redesigned default appearance of a female Shepard.

=== Sales ===
EA originally shipped 3.5 million units of Mass Effect 3 in its first month. It sold 349,000 digital copies on the PC alone by the end of March 2012. The game sold over 890,000 copies in its first 24 hours. According to The NPD Group, it sold 1.3 million physical copies in its debut month, which amounted to twice the total of Mass Effect 2 during its opening month in January 2010. In May 2012, EA reported that Mass Effect 3 grossed over $200 million during Q4 FY12.

=== Accolades ===
Following its release, Mass Effect 3 received a number of year-end awards, including Satellite Award for Outstanding Role Playing Game, Best RPG at the Spike Video Game Awards, Role-Playing/Massively Multiplayer Game of the Year at the 16th Annual D.I.C.E. Awards, Game of the Year from Game Informer, Best Overall RPG from IGN, and Best Co-Operative Multiplayer and Best Game Cinematography from Inside Gaming Awards.

Year	Award	Category	Recipient	Result	Ref
2011	Game Critics Awards	Best Console Game	Mass Effect 3	Nominated	
2011	Game Critics Awards	Best Role Playing Game	Mass Effect 3	Nominated	
2011	GameSpy's Best of E3 2011 Awards	Overall (and Multiplatform) Game of Show	Mass Effect 3	Nominated	
2011	GameSpy's Best of E3 2011 Awards	Role-Playing Game of Show	Mass Effect 3	Nominated	
2011	IGN Best of E3 2011 Awards	Best Overall Game	Mass Effect 3	Nominated	
2011	IGN Best of E3 2011 Awards	Best Xbox 360 Game	Mass Effect 3	Nominated	
2011	IGN Best of E3 2011 Awards	Best PC Game	Mass Effect 3	Nominated	
2011	IGN Best of E3 2011 Awards	Best Role-Playing Game	Mass Effect 3	Won	
2011	IGN Best of E3 2011 Awards	Best Trailer	Mass Effect 3	Nominated	
2011	IGN Best of E3 2011 Awards	Most Anticipated Game Award	Mass Effect 3	Nominated	
2011	Spike Video Game Awards	Most Anticipated Game	Mass Effect 3	Won	
2012	Game Informer Top 50 Games of 2012	Game of the Year	Mass Effect 3	Won	
2012	Game Informer Top 50 Games of 2012	Best Role-Playing	Mass Effect 3	Won	
2012	Game Informer Top 50 Games of 2012	Best Downloadable Content	Mass Effect 3	Won	
2012	Golden Joystick Awards	Best RPG	Mass Effect 3	Nominated	
2012	Golden Joystick Awards	Best Gaming Moment	Mass Effect 3 – Tuchanka Choice	Nominated	
2012	Golden Joystick Awards	The Golden Joystick Ultimate Game Award	Mass Effect 3	Nominated	
2012	IGN Best of 2012 Awards	Game of the Year	Mass Effect 3	Nominated	
2012	IGN Best of 2012 Awards	Best Xbox 360 Role-Playing Game	Mass Effect 3	Nominated	
2012	IGN Best of 2012 Awards	Best Xbox 360 Graphics	Mass Effect 3	Nominated	
2012	IGN Best of 2012 Awards	Best Xbox 360 Multiplayer Game	Mass Effect 3	Nominated	
2012	IGN Best of 2012 Awards	Best PS3 Role-Playing Game	Mass Effect 3	Won	
2012	IGN Best of 2012 Awards	Best PS3 Game	Mass Effect 3	Nominated	
2012	IGN Best of 2012 Awards	Best Overall Role-Playing Game	Mass Effect 3	Won	
2012	IGN Best of 2012 Awards	Best Overall Music	Mass Effect 3	Nominated	
2012	IGN Best of 2012 Awards	Best Overall Sound	Mass Effect 3	Nominated	
2012	Inside Gaming Awards	Best Co-Operative Multiplayer	Mass Effect 3	Won	
2012	Inside Gaming Awards	Best Game Cinematography	Mass Effect 3	Won	
2012	PC Gamer Game of the Year Awards 2012	The Game of the Year 2012	Mass Effect 3	Won	
2012	Polygon's 2012 Games of the Year	Game of the Year	Mass Effect 3	Nominated	
2012	Satellite Awards	Satellite Award for Outstanding Role Playing Game	Mass Effect 3	Won	
2012	Spike Video Game Awards	Game of the Year	Mass Effect 3	Nominated	
2012	Spike Video Game Awards	Best RPG	Mass Effect 3	Won	
2012	Spike Video Game Awards	Best Performance by a Human Female	Jennifer Hale	Nominated	
2012	Spike Video Game Awards	Best DLC	Mass Effect 3: Leviathan	Nominated	
2012	Spike Video Game Awards	Game of the Decade	Mass Effect 3	Nominated	
2013	16th Annual D.I.C.E. Awards	Role-Playing/Massively Multiplayer Game of the Year	Mass Effect 3	Won	
2013	16th Annual D.I.C.E. Awards	Outstanding Achievement in Character - Male or Female	Female Commander Shepard	Nominated	
2013	16th Annual D.I.C.E. Awards	Outstanding Achievement in Original Music Composition	Mass Effect 3	Nominated	
2013	Game Developers Choice Awards	Game of the Year	Mass Effect 3	Nominated	
2013	Game Developers Choice Awards	Best Narrative	Mass Effect 3	Nominated	
2013	Spike Video Game Awards	Best DLC	Mass Effect 3: Citadel	Nominated	

== Legacy ==
In the years following its release, Mass Effect 3 has received retrospective attention, with much of it focusing on the ending controversy. For example, a 2017 article by James Davenport of PC Gamer opined that the game's ending received an "inordinate" amount of criticism, and while he agreed that the ending was "problematic", he also noted that fixating on the ending could distract players from other aspects of the game. In 2018, Lucy O'Brien of IGN posited that BioWare's cooperative response to "Retake Mass Effect" contributed to a paradigm shift in how consumers influence video game developers. She ultimately concluded that the movement "helped lift up the velvet rope that once stood between gamer and game-maker." Wes Fenlon of PC Gamer suggested that the popularity of the game's multiplayer mode helped popularize loot boxes, "the worst monetization gimmick of the 2010s" in his opinion, and made it a mainstream feature in the video game industry.

Despite the controversies surrounding the game, some publications have cited Mass Effect 3 as one of the greatest video games of all time and as one of the best or most important games of the 2010s. In November 2012, the game was included in Time's list of the top 100 video games of all time, and in 2018, it was named among the greatest games of all time by Game Informer. By 2019, Mass Effect 3 was ranked as one of the best video games of the 2010s by VG247, Forbes, and Den of Geek. That same year, Eurogamer listed the character Mordin's final scene as one of their favorite moments of the decade. Mass Effect 3 was also identified by VentureBeat as one of the defining games of the 2010s due to the "firestorm of fans, press, and developers converging into an absolute mess of internet culture" over its ending, and its multiplayer mode, which ultimately became an unexpected monetary success.

== Future ==
On March 21, 2017, a standalone sequel, entitled Mass Effect: Andromeda, was released. The game takes place in the Andromeda galaxy during the 29th century following a 634-year sleeper ship journey from the Milky Way galaxy. It introduces a new protagonist, either Sara or Scott Ryder, and revolves around finding a new homeworld for humanity. As of February 2022, the next game of the Mass Effect universe was in pre-production, led by a veteran team at BioWare. In October 2026, Bioware was shut down, ending early development on the next Mass Effect project.
