= Krogan =

Fictional species in the Mass Effect series

- Mass Effect race
- Individual female (left) and male (right) krogan, as they appear in Mass Effect 3 (2012)
- First appearance: Mass Effect: Revelation (2007)
- Created by: BioWare

In-universe information
- Home world: Tuchanka

The krogan are a fictional extraterrestrial humanoid species in the Mass Effect multimedia franchise developed by BioWare and published by Electronic Arts. A member of the species is first introduced in the 2007 novel Mass Effect: Revelation. The krogan are typically depicted as large reptilian bipedal humanoids who are physically tenacious, favor mercenary work, and thrive on conflict and violence. The krogan are native to the planet Tuchanka, which is presented as a post-apocalyptic wasteland as a result of the krogan's global thermonuclear civil war in the distant past. The krogan are presented as having a complicated relationship with the rest of the Milky Way galactic civilizations, especially the salarians; a past conflict led to the other interstellar species unleashing a genetically engineered biological weapon called the genophage on the krogan, drastically reducing their population and potentially driving the species to a slow and inevitable extinction.

From a design perspective, krogan faces are inspired by bats. Their bodies are covered in a thick exoskeleton which is expressive of their battle-hardened nature. Animation limitations meant that krogan's design had to be tweaked in order to fit into human animation skeletons, which prompted the developers to increase the size of their back area in order to maintain the species' intimidating image. The krogan have appeared in most Mass Effect games and media, and are available as playable characters in the multiplayer modes for Mass Effect 3 and Mass Effect: Andromeda. Major characters include Urdnot Wrex, Grunt, Urdnot "Eve" Bakara, Nakmor Drack, and Nakmor Kesh.

The krogan are the central figures of the krogan genophage storyline, which spans most of the original Mass Effect trilogy and is referenced in Mass Effect: Andromeda. The storyline has received a very positive critical reception and is praised for its moral complexity and nuanced writing, in particular for its effectiveness as a plot device to create friction between alien species as well as a method to develop several characters of the series.

== Background ==
Within the series, the krogan are described as having warred over dwindling habitable land on Tuchanka thousands of years before the events of the Mass Effect trilogy. Nuclear weapons were deployed in such numbers that the krogan created a nuclear winter and transformed their planet into a radioactive wasteland. The krogan were reduced to primitive, warring clans as a result. Two thousand years before the events of the original trilogy, the salarians "culturally uplifted" the krogan by intervening in their development. The krogan were given faster-than-light technology by salarians, rather than discovering or developing it on their own, and were relocated to a new habitable world to live on. This was motivated by the salarians' desire to manipulate the krogan as soldiers to combat the rachni, who were winning a war against the Council at the time. Within two krogan generations, the krogan had the numbers to not only defeat the rachni for the council, but also push them back to their home world and commit genocide on the species. As reward for their efforts, the krogan were awarded former rachni worlds and several other planets in Citadel space to settle. Their fallen were even honored with a monument in the Citadel, which still exists in the trilogy's timeline.

However, the salarians' gambit backfired when the krogan population, uncontrolled by natural predators or harsh environments, exploded. Facing a population crisis, the krogan forcefully extended their dominion to other planets The krogan eventually founded a colony on the asari world of Lusia and refuse to leave. In response, the Council ordered the Spectres, special forces personnel originally founded to keep the krogan in check, to strike at the krogan, who retaliated and sparked the Krogan Rebellions. The Citadel Council also made first contact with the Turian Hierarchy, who eventually join the war against the krogan.

The Krogan Rebellions continued unabated as the krogan were able to persist due to their high birth-rate. The turians eventually deployed the genophage, a biological weapon developed by salarian scientists, on the krogan. This forced the krogan to accept the turian terms of surrender. Once hailed as the saviors of the galaxy from the rachni, their role at the center of the Citadel military has been replaced by the turians, and are a shadow of their former prominence by the events of the original trilogy. Due to the genophage, which causes near-total sterilization of the krogan, their birth rate have plummeted with only 1 in 1000 krogan births being viable.

== Concept and design ==
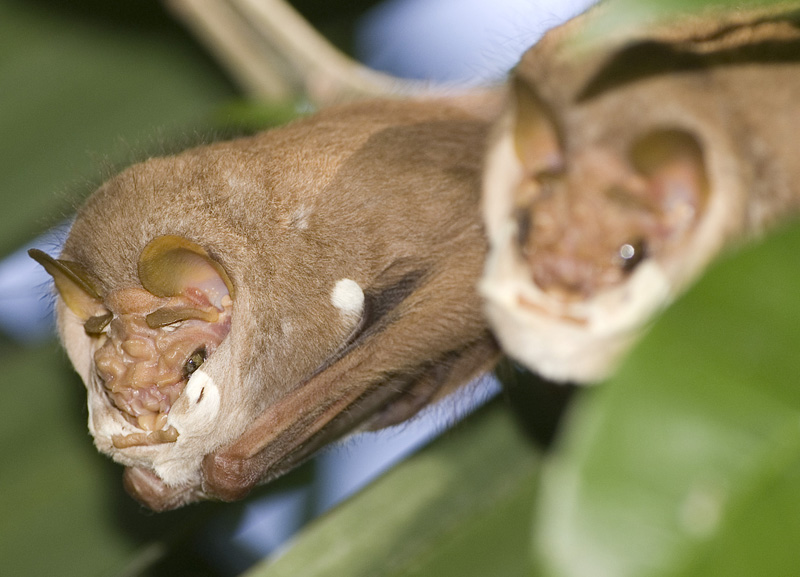
Krogan faces were inspired by bats, particularly the wrinkle-faced bat.

During the initial concept stage for the krogan's visual design, the writing team for Mass Effect provided a short written paragraph to the design team, which contains a basic description of the species, lore background, and specific but concise details on what they require for the race. Associate art director Matt Rhodes chose the wrinkle-faced bat as his basis for krogan faces, as he felt that their faces look alien to him. He refined the concept by creating more drawings of different animal species, and then blending the disparate designs he has seen for the final design. As a battle-hardened race, something akin to a thick chitin exoskeleton was given to the race. The heavy skin of an Indian rhinoceros was used as the reference for the krogan's body.

Originally, the eyes of a krogan were located on the sides of their heads; as they were being modeled, the modeler noted that this was a typical trait of prey animals. Rhodes agreed with his colleague's assessment, and so the eyes of the krogan were moved to the front to match their predatorial nature. This had the benefit of both making their design more believable, and worked better in conversation. The team faced limitations when texturing and preparing the krogan character model for inclusion into the game as it still had to fit into a humanoid skeleton for animation purposes, which results in the deprecation of some early concept of large, apelike creatures. As the back area of a race was considered a "safe" area, which allow designers to play with the silhouette without negatively impacting combat animation and conversations, the team resolved to increase the mass of that area for the krogan, which led to their characteristic large humps.

The writing team would normally collaborate on top-level ideas and then individually take charge of specific characters and story arcs. The genophage story arc, which dominates the opening third of Mass Effect 3, was written by senior writer John Dombrow, in collaboration with Patrick Weekes who wrote Mordin Solus in Mass Effect 2. The krogan concept as a tragic species waiting for redemption was heavily influenced by the 1992 space game Star Control II and referenced multiple races found in the game's plot. The krogan's troubled backstory resemble the brutish Thraddash, including their nuclear self-destruction and later weaponization against an arachnoid race. Krogan biology is also influenced by the fast-breeding Shofixti, which informed their story arc of being uplifted into space following their self-destruction, depopulation in the aftermath of the Krogan Rebellions, and are ultimately repopulated as part of a potential story arc in Mass Effect 3.

The krogan land vehicle is repurposed from an unused early design of the Mako. Watts recalled that when the vehicle was driven around a level in the first Mass Effect during preliminary testing, the team found that the vehicle was too big and it was too so hard to spot the enemies or even try to shoot them. It proved to be a perfect fit in Tuchanka, where its oversized tires are a sensible asset for driving over rubble and war-torn terrain.

One of the enemy types introduced in Mass Effect 3 are brutes, designed as a repulsive synthesis of the body of a krogan and the head of a turian; the homeworlds of both species are closely linked in the invasion plan of the Reapers within the narrative. Brutes are large, tough enemies armed with oversized claws that can pick up enemies and mash them into the ground, though their abdomens and vital organs are protected by armor plating which can be blown off with sustained attacks.

== Attributes ==
=== Biology ===
Nakmor Kesh (left) beside her grandfather Nakmor Drack (right), as they appear in Mass Effect: Andromeda. Their contrasting facial plating, coloration, and weathered features illustrate variation in krogan age and facial structure.

In terms of physical appearance, the krogan have been variously described as a horny toad crossed with a stegosaurus, or "toads with sharp teeth". Krogan are usually more than 7 feet tall; the large shoulder humps on a krogan individual store fluids and nutrients, which enables them to survive for extended periods without food or water. Krogan naturally reproduce and mature at an extremely high rate, and are also capable of living for centuries, sometimes well over a thousand years, before dying a natural death. Biotic individuals are rare, though those who do possess the talent are typically quite strong in their abilities. Battlemasters such as Urdnot Wrex are elite warriors who combine biotic abilities with advanced weaponry and tactics.

Krogan possess a thick and nearly impervious hide, which is extremely hardy and very resistant to cuts, scrapes, and contusions. A mature krogan's skin is similar to a tortoise's in quality, whereas a younger krogan has finer skin, which looks softer and is scaly like a lizard. Similar to a newborn baby's skull with soft bones, a young krogan's crest consists of many smaller segments that have yet to form into a solid plate. Male krogan who reach an older developmental age has a full crown with large spikes. Krogan also possess multiple secondary and tertiary organs for all of their major bodily systems, which serve as backups should the primary organ be damaged. Krogan have four testicles which reside in distinct sacks. Krogan are also highly resistant to radiation, poisons, and extreme temperatures. Krogan can enter a “blood rage” in which they become impervious to pain, and are said to be virtually impossible to paralyze.

=== Culture ===
The krogan are depicted as having evolved a range of extraordinary abilities and traits in the evolutionary crucible of their homeworld Tuchanka's intensely hostile environment, which in antiquity kept their population at sustainable equilibrium until krogan culture reached its industrial age. The instincts that helped the krogan to conquer Tuchanka and led to their self-destruction are just as strong following the deployment of the genophage, but are no longer supported by their prodigious rate of reproduction, as the salarians had underestimated the krogan's cultural drive to prove oneself in life by facing deadly challenges.

In modern krogan society, isolated male krogan roam the galaxy and are usually employed in mercenary work for and with other species. They are highly territorial and do not share living space, even within a starship's necessarily cramped confines. Female krogan are rarely seen outside of the few krogan-dominated worlds, where they primarily live in powerful, fiercely defended all-female clans that focus on the breeding of each meager new generation. The krogan's slow decline due to genetically engineered impotence with the possibility of an inevitable extinction, lead to many individuals hardening their personalities and becoming self-centered. Much of their culture is characterized by resentful attitudes and existential fatalism, though some individuals remain optimistic that their species will still somehow survive.

=== Homeworld ===
Tuchanka first appears in Mass Effect 2, where it is established as a bomb-blasted planet. Tuchanka's surface was not always covered in bombardment craters, radioactive rubble, choking ash, salt flats, and alkaline seas, as it was teeming with life thousands of years before the events of the trilogy, where thick jungles of tree-analogues and highly competitive fauna grew in fierce abundance under the searing heat of its sun Aralakh. As krogan society remained fundamentally oriented around perseverance over deadly adversity, the krogan turned on each other after taming their environment. Global thermonuclear war irradiated Tuchanka into a wasteland, with a nuclear winter that followed its aftermath killed off much of the remaining plant life while the surviving krogan retreated into massive underground bunkers from the nuclear fallout. Krogan society would revert to a tribal Stone Age over thousands of years, where they live among the ruins of their once glorious civilization. Among the advanced technology offered to the krogan by the salarians included the means to stabilize Tuchanka's ruined atmosphere via terraforming technology. A high tech atmospheric device known as The Shroud is built by the salarians to block the harsh heat from Aralakh. Notable wildlife native to Tuchanka include the dog-like varren, crab-like klixen and giant carnivorous subterranean sandworms known as thresher maws. One notable creature is Kalros, "the mother of all thresher maws" who plays a significant role in the spiritual beliefs of krogan society as well as repelling the Reaper invasion of Tuchanka.

In Mass Effect 3, the ruins of a lost krogan city encountered by Commander Shepard's party is meant to evoke a notion that the krogan civilization may be worth saving, and they once created works of beauty before the collapse of their society as well as their own near-extinction. The architectural style of the ancient ruins are based on the work of Frank Lloyd Wright, over which a veneer of krogan aesthetics is placed to project a more brutal nature. Minor battle damage and sparse foliage dot seen all over the ruins imply that even in the face of mass destruction, life has a dim and fragile hope of persisting.

== Appearances ==
=== Mass Effect ===
Krogan characters are featured prominently in several Mass Effect media including novels, comics and an animated film where they are usually depicted as mercenaries and often assume antagonistic roles. The first krogan character in the media franchise, a battlemaster named Skarr, appears in Mass Effect: Revelation as a secondary antagonist. In the novel, Skarr is hired by the batarian nobleman Edan Had'dah to kill Kahlee Sanders and is later defeated and killed by David Anderson.

In the Mass Effect video game series, krogan characters are encountered either as non-player characters or enemy units in innumerable missions and scenarios. Several krogan character variants are playable in the multiplayer modes of Mass Effect 3 and Mass Effect: Andromeda.

The first Mass Effect game provides a comprehensive background for the krogan genophage storyline within in-game dialogue and codex entries, and introduces Urdnot Wrex, an agent of the Shadow Broker who joins the crew of the SSV Normandy to pursue the rogue turian Spectre Saren Arterius. Upon discovering Saren's base of operations on the planet Virmire and that his scientists has successfully developed a cure for the krogan genophage there, Wrex insists that the cure must be preserved at all costs and turns on Commander Shepard. If Shepard successfully convinces him to stand down and cooperate with the team's mission to destroy Saren's base, he will return in later sequels and eventually become a leader of the krogan people.

Mass Effect 2 introduces Grunt as an optional party member who is available after Shepard attempts to recruit Okeer, a krogan warlord and scientist who has been developing genetically engineered krogan in an attempt to counter the genophage. Shepard may visit the krogan homeworld Tuchanka as part of Grunt's personal storyline, where either Urdnot Wrex or his half-brother Urdnot Wreav is encountered as the leader of Clan Urdnot. The krogan genophage also plays a central role in the overarching subplot of the salarian scientist Mordin Solus, whose protégé Maelon has resorted to experimenting on krogan females in order to find a cure.

Mass Effect 3 deals with the resolution of the krogan genophage storyline. After meeting with Primarch Victus, leader of the Turian Hierarchy, he pledges support to Shepard on the condition that the krogan help defend their homeworld, Palaven. The leader of Clan Urdnot, by now effectively the head of state of the krogan people, refuses unless and until the genophage is cured. A cure is being developed by Mordin, or Padok Wiks if Mordin did not survive the events of Mass Effect 2, with the help of a fertile female krogan nicknamed "Eve", and is to be dispersed through the Shroud structure on Tuchanka once successfully completed. On the other hand, Dalatrass Linron, the leader of the Salarian Union government, reveals that the Shroud had already been compromised and offers Shepard her government's support for the war effort against the Reapers. Ultimately, Shepard must either allow the salarian scientist to undo the sabotage and complete the cure, or stop them from deploying the cure. A successful sabotage will deceive Wreav but Shepard will be forced to kill Wrex on a later occasion, losing krogan support in the process.

In Mass Effect: Andromeda, the krogan are one of the Milky Way species participating in the Andromeda Initiative, a civilian project which sends settlers on board "ark ships" on a one-way trip to the Andromeda Galaxy prior to the events of Mass Effect 3. Nakmor Drack, a member of Clan Nakmor, joins the crew of the Andromeda Initiative Survey Ship Tempest as a companion of the human Pathfinder. Taking a cue from Mordin's prior work on the genophage, the krogan that have participated in the Andromeda Initiative have undergone gene therapy while in cryosleep and managed to improve the viability of their offspring by a small, but significant, percentage. The success of this procedure is proven when Drack's granddaughter, Kesh, gives birth to a healthy clutch of krogan infants after the defeat of the Kett.

=== In other media ===
The krogan are referenced as an easter egg in Dragon Age: Inquisition, a video game also developed by BioWare.

The krogan are featured as a themed skin for Anthem player characters, released on November 7, 2019 in commemoration of "N7 Day", an informal celebration of the Mass Effect franchise observed annually.

== Reception ==
When specific historical moments gets folded into fictional constructs (with a certain amount of talent), they can become universal. Look at the way Mass Effect meditates on power struggles throughout history and what you see is a cyclical scenario of races being allowed to proliferate as long as they serve the needs of the ruling class, only to be culled later when things get ugly. It's the kind of social Darwinism that makes you wince and two key missions force the player to confront it.

— Evan Narcisse, "Wrex in Effect, or, Deep Space and the Negro/Injun/Krogan Problem"

The moral complexity of the krogan genophage and the player's opportunity to decide on the future of the krogan race, one of the major plot points in the original trilogy, has received a very positive reception. Critics, such as GameSpot staff, consider the krogan genophage to be one of the most compelling and profound stories in the Mass Effect universe. Tom Phillips from Eurogamer picked Priority: Tuchanka in Mass Effect 3, where Shepard gets to decide on the fate of a species and whether to cure the genophage, as the finest moment of the Mass Effect trilogy. He noted that "its choices run deeper, the consequences greater, and the writing is some of the finest throughout the trilogy". To him, the mission's best aspect is that there is no clear ideal outcome, and called it "a masterpiece full of character moments" and the culmination of storylines involving the krogan genophage which had been building since the first game. Sebastian Alvarado from Kotaku said the storyline challenges players with necessary moral dilemmas and to be accountable for their actions, and serves an "ugly reminder of human history in the early 20th century where several countries practiced forced sterilization, often as part of a eugenics program."

Timothy J. Seppala from Engadget praised the complicated krogan and salarian relationship, which underpinned the krogan genophage storyline and is continued into Mass Effect: Andromeda, as a prime example of the developers' "absurdly detailed world building". Narcisse noted that Wrex's dialogue about his people's situation in the original Mass Effect reminded him of the plight of Native Americans, and he pointed to the land struggles faced by the "remnants of the Sioux, Coeur d'Alene and Seminole nations" as an example. As a result, Narcisse sympathized with the krogan and felt an "odd kind of kinship" with the character as a black man. Matt Bradford from GamesRadar+ opined that it is understandable for the krogan to come across as bitter since they were deliberately infected with a biological weapon that is slowly rendering them extinct.

According to player statistics released by BioWare for Mass Effect 3, an overwhelming majority of players chose to cure the genophage and save the krogan from extinction in their playthroughs.

Andy Kelly from PC Gamer consider the krogan to be one of the best enemies in PC gaming, noting that they do not hesitate about charging into gunfire unlike most other enemies, and that a single shotgun-wielding krogan can decimate a player's entire squad if they are not careful.

Krogan characters have been cosplayed and depicted in fan art, among other forms of fan labor.

=== Analysis ===
The genophage has been compared to real world population control methods employed against mosquitoes. An example cited is a controversial gene therapy technique that targets mosquito larvae, wiping out populations of mosquitoes carrying deadly diseases by creating a new breed of mosquitoes that have defective genes, which sparked ethical concerns for its unforeseen impacts to the wider biosphere. In an article published by Kotaku in 2013, Sebastian Alvarado from Stanford University analyzed whether the genophage is scientifically possible in the real world.

The relationship and history between the salarians and the krogan have been analyzed at length by a number of sources. Marino Carvalho noted that the game's lore "demonstrates that there are specific levels of development within which technological advancement is safe", and cautioned against the proliferation of technology without heed of morality or consequences. Amy M. Green observed that the salarians, as colonizers, decry responsibility and blame the krogan for creating their own misery when the consequences of their own unethical actions continue to destabilize the krogan long after the Krogan Rebellions have ended. Evan Narcisse drew parallels between the exploitation of the krogan and real world history, such as the Buffalo Soldiers, the Tuskegee experiments, as well as American and Soviet strategies of propping up despotic proxy regimes during the Cold War.
