= Wrex =

Fictional character from Mass Effect

- Mass Effect character
- Wrex as he appears in Mass Effect 3
- First appearance: Mass Effect (2007)
- Voiced by: Steven Barr

In-universe information
- Full name: Urdnot Wrex
- Race: Krogan
- Home: Tuchanka

Wrex (full name Urdnot Wrex) is a fictional character in BioWare's Mass Effect franchise, who serves as a party member (or "squadmate") in the first game of the Mass Effect trilogy. He returns as a supporting character in Mass Effect 2 and Mass Effect 3. Wrex is a Krogan, an alien species that was near-sterilized by other galactic races in the Mass Effect franchise's backstory. The character is voiced by American voice actor Steven Barr.

Wrex was given red coloring and scars to distinguish him from other individuals of his species and stress his combat experience. Wrex's possible death in Mass Effect limited his role in the following games, as the narrative team had to write a replacement character with a different background. The character only appears in the second and third games provided he survives a confrontation in the first game with the player character and protagonist, Commander Shepard. This confrontation was designed to slowly build up tension to keep the player engaged. In the following games, he becomes the leader of the Krogan species, ultimately playing an important role in the curing of the genophage, the artificial population control plague that was instilled on his people. In the Citadel downloadable content for the third game, he is available as a squadmate for the DLC's duration. In addition to the games, he makes an appearance in the Mass Effect: Foundation tie-in comic series.

The character was positively received, with critics commending Wrex's writing and character evolution in the Mass Effect trilogy. His confrontation with Shepard in the first game has also been subject to critical commentary, with praise going towards its moral complexity and emotional weight. Wrex earned "Sidekick of the Year" in the Official Xbox Magazine's 2007 Game of the Year Awards. Several scholars have analyzed Wrex's role in the Mass Effect trilogy through a racial, cultural, and ethical perspective. Merchandise of the character has also been made available, including a series of PVC statues.

== Concept and design ==
=== Visual design ===
Urdnot Wrex is a Krogan, one of an alien species that was near-sterilized by other galactic races in the Mass Effect universe. To distinguish Wrex from other members of his species, the Mass Effect art team gave his head a "splash" of red color that covered his skull plate in a specific fiery red pattern to create a unique and menacing appearance. The art team further gave Wrex's face abundant scarring, meant to demonstrate his combat experience and survivability. In order to visualize how Wrex's facial expressions would look in animation, the art team designed several facial expressions for the character. For Wrex's return in Mass Effect 2, he was envisioned to be the leader of his people. Since the Krogan are consumed by constant internal warfare, they would live in the ruins scattered throughout their home world of Tuchanka, and players would find Wrex sitting on a throne surrounded by the rubble of the Krogan's once-glorious civilization.

=== Narrative design ===
In the first Mass Effect, Wrex was written by senior writer Mac Walters, who found a challenge in writing a character that could both stand out individually and serve to give an insight into the Krogan species and its role in the Mass Effect universe. Wrex's confrontation late in the game with Commander Shepard was designed to slowly build tension, with Wrex escalating the discussion as the two move closer together, with camera angles indicating a struggle for dominance. This was intended to keep the player engaged as the confrontation advanced, as it would ultimately culminate in them making a decision regarding Wrex.

Because Urdnot Wrex may not survive his initial appearance in the first game, the narrative team had limited options for his role in Mass Effect 2. His possible death meant that a replacement character with their own backstory and role in the game had to be created, so that said character did not feel like a "Wrex alternate". This ultimately complicated the work of the game's cinematic designers, who had to account for the possibility of two different characters playing the same role in the same scenes. This same challenge regarding Urdnot Wrex's possible death carried into Mass Effect 3, in which John Dombrow was in charge of Wrex's narrative design. The narrative and design teams had to design the quest structures in Mass Effect 3 so that Wrex was present in a way that his role felt significant enough while not being a member of the player's party. The final quest design sees Urdnot Wrex making sporadic appearances throughout the gameplay. For the character's voice acting, BioWare cast American voice actor Steven Barr.

== Appearances ==
Wrex is one of the Mass Effect characters to make an appearance in every game in the Mass Effect trilogy. Wrex has also appeared in various official Mass Effect non-video game media, including the Mass Effect 3: Citadel tie-in comic series Mass Effect: Foundation. He is one of the four Mass Effect squadmates included in the Mass Effect: Board Game – Priority Hagalaz, in which he has his own unique set of skills. Wrex also makes an appearance in the theatrical motion simulator amusement park ride Mass Effect: New Earth.

=== In Mass Effect video games ===
Wrex is introduced in the original Mass Effect game as a bounty hunter hired by the Shadow Broker, a mysterious information broker, to assassinate one of their former agents. Wrex first encounters player character Commander Shepard in their own endeavor to locate the agent. After Wrex joins Shepard's squad, Shepard may engage in multiple conversations with the character. Through these conversations, the player gets an insight into the genophage, a bioweapon created by the Salarians to alter Krogan fertility rates to keep their populations in check. Wrex eventually asks Shepard for help in retrieving a piece of armor, a family heirloom. A confrontation scene between Wrex and Shepard occurs at a Krogan cloning facility set up on the fictional planet of Virmire by the game's main antagonist, Saren Arterius. Wrex protests the prospect of destroying the facility and the genophage cure that had been created alongside it, causing Shepard to attempt to make Wrex back down. This confrontation may result in the death of Wrex should Shepard be unable to convince him to stand down. The option to have him survive is always available if his family armor has been located.

Provided he survives the events of the first game, Wrex makes a return as the leader of his species in Mass Effect 2, where Shepard encounters him on the surface of the Krogan home world of Tuchanka while seeking his assistance in helping one of two squadmates, Grunt or Mordin Solus. As a leader, Wrex is depicted as a reformer who wants to change Krogan society both politically and culturally.

Wrex also returns in the franchise's third entry, Mass Effect 3, which sees Shepard seek to cure the genophage to secure an alliance between several species as a part of their war effort in the Reaper War, an ongoing invasion by a species of gigantic spacefaring sentient machines against the Milky Way races. Wrex and Shepard venture to the Salarian home world of Sur'Kesh in an effort to rescue the last surviving fertile Krogan female, Eve, ultimately extracting her off the planet with the help of Salarian scientist Mordin Solus, if Mordin survives the events of Mass Effect 2. With a cure for the genophage nearing completion, Wrex, Shepard, Eve, and Mordin depart towards Tuchanka to spread the cure throughout the planet. Before arriving, Shepard is given a proposition by the Salarian leader to sabotage the cure's dispersal to secure Salarian aid for the war. Should Shepard ignore this proposition and disperse the cure, Wrex expresses his gratitude. If Shepard decides to sabotage the cure instead, they are forced to kill Wrex when he eventually finds out about it and confronts them on the Citadel, a massive space station and neural hub in the Mass Effect universe. Provided he is alive, Wrex returns as a party member during the Citadel downloadable content.

If Wrex didn't survive the events of the first Mass Effect game, he is replaced by his brother, Urdnot Wreav, a traditionalist who seeks revenge against the Salarians and the Turians for the creation of the genophage. Unlike Wrex, Wreav is successfully deceived if Shepard decides to sabotage the cure.

== Reception and analysis ==
Prior to the release of the first game, Ray Muzyka, CEO of BioWare at the time, believed that Wrex would prove one of the more popular squadmates. In addition, lead designer Preston Watamaniuk has called him his personal favorite character in the trilogy. Dark Horse released several PVC statues of the character, including a 1000 unit limited edition statue with a distinct white and pink armor. Diamond Select Toys released a figurine of Urdnot Wrex as a part of a Mass Effect product line. A Mass Effect cosmetic downloadable content featuring a costume of Wrex was released for LittleBigPlanet 2, LittleBigPlanet Karting, and LittleBigPlanet PS Vita.

=== Reception ===
Wrex has been received well as a party member, ranking highly in multiple "top" character lists, with writers discussing his character evolution and his uniqueness when compared to other mercenaries in video games. Evan Narcisse, writing for The Atlantic, described Wrex as an apparently "gruff" and "bloodthirsty" companion who is later shown to hold a regret about the death of his species, drawing parallels between Shepard's conversations with Wrex and the situation of the Sioux, Coeur d'Alene and Seminole nations. Similarly, Christopher Livingston of PC Gamer observed that Wrex showed a deep-thinking nature while remaining "tough-as-nails". Wrex's role as a squadmate also earned him "Sidekick of the Year" in the Official Xbox Magazine's 2007 Game of the Year Awards. His mention of the protagonist's name, "Shepard", has become one of the series' most quoted lines.

Journalists have discussed the moral complexity and emotional weight of Wrex's confrontation with Commander Shepard in the first Mass Effect. In "The Toughest Life Or Death Choice In The Gaming Universe", Kotaku's Stephen Totilo called the choice "shocking", concluding that there was no obvious right answer to the dilemma. Narcisse expressed empathy with Wrex's stance on Saren's genophage cure as a way to give his people a chance to flourish, feeling a personal connection with Wrex's point of view. Anthony Burch, in an article for Destructoid, compared his experience with both scenarios, expressing sadness and shock at Wrex's possible death, while feeling happy but bored by "the ho-hum nature of Wrex's survival". Burch argued that Wrex's fate had always been within the player's control, with the character's chances to survive increasing with player interaction. Christopher Livingston deemed Wrex's death "unfair", expressing frustration at how the game presented the option to keep him alive.

Other writers have commented on his role in the latter two installments of the Mass Effect trilogy, regarding his characterization and evolution positively while criticizing his more minor appearances in them. Cian Maher of TheGamer contended that in leaving Wrex to die in the first game, the player is depriving themselves of one of the series' "best [...] characters", noting how he was tied to some of the series' "best writing" in Mass Effect 2 and 3. Maher regarded Wrex as "Mass Effect's biggest punk", commenting on his loyalty towards Shepard and his character development from a "grisly merc" to uniting the Krogan clans. Similar remarks were made by Jhaan Elker, writing for The Washington Post's Launcher, who pointed out how Wrex had grown into a "capable leader" in Mass Effect 3 who was attempting to "correct his race's mistakes". In contrast, Christopher Livingston criticized how his possible death in the first game limited him to a small presence in Mass Effect 2, and to being a temporary squadmate during a DLC in Mass Effect 3.

=== Analysis ===
Scholars have analyzed Urdnot Wrex's role in the Mass Effect trilogy through the themes of race and culture. Christopher B. Patterson claimed Wrex's role in his confrontation with Shepard was not reducible to simply that of a terrorist monster, arguing that Wrex encompassed a much more complex personality. Patterson further argued that Shepard's conversations with Wrex throughout the game mirror "racial authenticity and knowledge in the United States". Eamon Reid, drawing on philosopher Tristan Garcia's cultural framework, maintained that Wrex's desire to reform Krogan culture reflects a tension between an idealist promise in his leadership and the realist assessment of Krogan culture.

Frank G. Bosman examined Wrex from a moral and ethical perspective. Bosman brought up Wrex's confrontation in the first Mass Effect as an example of a problem that inspires a narratological and ethical behavior on the player but can be resolved easily by exploiting the game's own systems. Bosman contended that the apparent ethical dilemma proposed in it was hindered by the ability to exploit the game's save system.
