= Mass Effect: Foundation =

Comic book series

- An alternate cover of the first issue, featuring Ashley Williams fighting a geth unit.

Publication information
- Publisher: Dark Horse Comics
- Schedule: Monthly
- Format: Ongoing series
- Publication date: July 2013 – July 2014
- No. of issues: 13
- Main character: Characters appearing in the Mass Effect trilogy

Creative team
- Written by: Mac Walters; Jeremy Barlow
- Artist(s): Tony Parker; Omar Francia; Garry Brown; Benjamin Carré (covers)
- Penciller: Matthew Clark
- Inker(s): Drew Geraci; Sean Parsons
- Colorist: Michael Atiyeh

Mass Effect: Foundation is a Canadian science fiction comic book series published by Dark Horse Comics featuring several secondary characters from the original Mass Effect trilogy. The fifth Mass Effect comic series to be produced, Foundation is a tie-in to 2013's Mass Effect 3: Citadel downloadable content, the story of Foundation explores the characters' backstories prior to their meeting with Commander Shepard. Much of its narrative is framed as reconnaissance by the antagonist of Citadel, Maya Brooks, as the point-of-view character, with the first issue exploring her childhood and origin story.

The series lasted 13 issues, from July 2013 to July 2014. Most issues function as standalone stories for each featured character, and some issues have direct ties to specific events in the games. Foundation was mostly written by Mass Effect series lead writer Mac Walters, with Jeremy Barlow joining as co-writer from Issues #11 to #13, and artwork was provided by Tony Parker, Omar Francia, Drew Geraci, Matthew Clark and Garry Brown for various issues.

As the first ongoing comic series in the Mass Effect franchise, Foundation was considered to be the most ambitious Mass Effect comic book series project at the time, with writer Walters committing to explore stories hinted at in the games while advancing a new narrative. The series has been received positively by critics, who praised the writing, artwork, and how it serves as a tie-in to various historical points in the Mass Effect trilogy.

== Plot ==
The first issue of Foundation details a desperate child in the violent mining colony of Themis. By the end of the issue she turns on a covert ops agent she had encountered earlier and assumes control of her resources. Going by "Rasa" as an adult, she is interviewed by the Illusive Man for her expression of interest to join Cerberus, the anthropocentric paramilitary organization Cerberus he leads. The remainder of the series sees Rasa compiling and reviewing dossiers on a number of notable individuals for Cerberus while delving into their backstories. These characters eventually become Commander Shepard's companions in Mass Effect 2 and participate in the suicide mission against the Collectors. Other major characters who make recurring appearances in the series include Miranda Lawson and Kai Leng as Rasa's Cerberus colleagues.

In Issue #13 and the series finale, Rasa severs ties with Cerberus and sets her act of betrayal in motion. She steals a tank containing a dormant clone of Shepard, created as a contingency to potentially provide spare organs and limbs for the real Shepard, and escapes Lazarus Research Station after executing a station-wide sabotage of Cerberus mechs. Rasa would eventually remerge in the Citadel DLC for Mass Effect 3, and assume the alias of Maya Brooks.

== Publication ==
"When we started talking about what we could do in the future, we said, "Well, obviously, something that's character-based could work." Rather than going into an area where we tell brand-new stories in a universe that people know already, maybe we could find ways of fleshing out some of the stories that we've heard hints of already. At a high level, that's where we thought about going with "Foundations" and that's where we went with it."

— Mac Walters, in an interview with CBR

Foundation is the first ongoing comics series set in the Mass Effect series and is the first series to be scripted by Walters on his own; Walters had worked on some of the franchise's mini-series prior to Foundation, and was responsible for reviewing other writers' contributions to the script. Walters noted that he was able to fully commit to a longer series with the release of Mass Effect 3 in March 2012 and conclusion of the production schedule for its downloadable content by early 2013. Walters said that the development of Foundation's main character is different from other prominent female characters in the series, as the concept for this character came about through the comic first, and that her story and background could be developed without being filtered through the perception of a player character like Shepard.

Foundation features a story that runs parallel to the game trilogy and is designed to expand the universe as a whole. Previous Mass Effect comics have focused on the supporting cast of the series and sets its story from the main events of the trilogy. Walters explained that Foundation continued with this creative direction due to the difficulty of representing a canonical Shepard without invalidating players' choices in the games, and that it is impossible to explore the backstory of a younger Shepard as Shepard's gender, class, first name and facial appearance are varied and customised by players. Walters explained that certain fan favorite characters are featured in the series, and that the series was conceived to flesh out some of the existing backstories of the featured characters, or expand upon story points which were only hinted at or alluded to in the games. The story does so by making connections between the characters' backstories to the villain of Mass Effect 3: Citadel as part of its narrative. For example, Issue #5 which follows Miranda Lawson and Jacob Taylor is a direct tie in to Mass Effect 2.

== Release ==
The Foundation series consisted of 13 issues. Jeremy Barlow joined Walters as co-writer for Issues #11, #12 and #13. Tony Parker contributed art for most issues of the comic series, except for Issue #1, #5, #6, and #7. Michael Atiyeh provided colors for the series, and Benjamin Carré was the cover artist for the series. The first issue sold 9,291 issues following the first day of release on July 31, 2013, placing it in the 229th highest sales for the month. The sales figures for Issues #1 to #3 and Issues #5 to #9 of Foundation were analyzed in a May 2014 article by Chris Rice, which charted the month to month sales of alternative comics based on sales figures for comics sold by Diamond to direct market retailers from April 2013 to March 2014, with Foundation placing the 299th place. On February 5, 2014 Dark Horse released a reprint of the first issue under its "#1 for $1" promotional initiative, with an alternative cover which utilizes the artwork for Issue #3.

All thirteen issues of Foundation have been released digitally on Dark Horse's official website, and were subsequently collected and released as trade paperback graphic novels. The first four series were collected as Mass Effect Foundation Volume 1 TPB; issues 5 to 8 were collected as Mass Effect Foundation Volume 2 TPB; and the remaining issues were collected as Mass Effect Foundation Volume 3 TPB. The entirety of the Foundation series was included in Mass Effect Library Edition Volume 2, an anthology collection of comics published on May 6, 2015; it was later republished as Mass Effect Omnibus Volume 2 on February 8, 2017.

Issue	Pages	Date	Writer(s)	Artist(s)	Colorist	Cover artist	Ref.
1	24	July 24, 2013	Mac Walters	Omar Francia	Michael Atiyeh	Benjamin Carré	
2	24	August 28, 2013	Mac Walters	Tony Parker	Michael Atiyeh	Benjamin Carré	
3	24	September 25, 2013	Mac Walters	Tony Parker	Michael Atiyeh	Benjamin Carré	
4	24	October 23, 2013	Mac Walters	Tony Parker	Michael Atiyeh	Benjamin Carré	
5	23	November 23, 2013	Mac Walters	Penciller: Matthew Clark; Inker: Drew Geraci	Michael Atiyeh	Benjamin Carré	
6	23	December 18, 2013	Mac Walters	Penciller: Matthew Clark; Inker: Sean Parsons	Michael Atiyeh	Benjamin Carré	
7	24	January 22, 2014	Mac Walters	Garry Brown	Michael Atiyeh	Benjamin Carré	
8	24	February 26, 2014	Mac Walters	Tony Parker	Michael Atiyeh	Benjamin Carré	
9	24	March 26, 2014	Mac Walters	Tony Parker	Michael Atiyeh	Benjamin Carré	
10	23	April 23, 2014	Mac Walters	Tony Parker	Michael Atiyeh	Benjamin Carré	
11	24	May 28, 2014	Mac Walters; Jeremy Barlow	Tony Parker	Michael Atiyeh	Benjamin Carré	
12	24	June 25, 2014	Mac Walters; Jeremy Barlow	Tony Parker	Michael Atiyeh	Benjamin Carré	
13	24	July 23, 2014	Mac Walters; Jeremy Barlow	Tony Parker	Michael Atiyeh	Benjamin Carré	

== Reception ==
The series as a whole holds a score of 8.3 out of 10 on comics review aggregator Comic Book Roundup, indicating generally favorable reviews, based on 49 reviews by critics of individual issues. Volume 1, Volume 2 and Volume 3 of Mass Effect: Foundation TPB hold scores of 7.9, 9.1 and 8.2 respectively. Except for Issues #11 and #13 which had scored 7.3 out of 10, indicating mixed or average reviews, all other individual comics received generally favorable reviews. Issue #5 in particular holds 9.4 out of 10, indicating universal acclaim. Reviewing the first issue for AIPT, Alex Craig scored Foundation 7 out of 10: he praised Walter's solid writing, fast pace of the story with plenty of plot twists, and Omar Francia’s art for its thematic synergy, but criticized the awkward posing depicted in fight scenes and the overuse of cliches. He said the first issue weaved itself well into Mass Effect game universe "by using the game’s second best story feature, the espionage and unexpected twists built into the hardships of space life". Reviewing the first volume of the Mass Effect: Foundation TPB, Alasdair Stuart from SciFiNow noted that the Mass Effect comics "have always done a good job of fitting around the narrative of the games whilst adding to it, but none have ever been as ambitious as Foundation". He praised the series' two narrative strands, "one featuring guest appearances by existing characters and the other following a character introduced in the wonderful Citadel DLC as they interact with your old crew", as a good idea which allows for exploration of stories hinted at in the games and also break some new narrative ground. Stuart scored Foundation 4 out of 5 stars, calling it a "confident, fun series that provides welcome insight into some dearly loved characters", and singled out Issue #2 which features Urdnot Wrex as a highlight.

Ashley Reed from Gameradar, Christen Bejar from CBR, and Robbie Key from Gameinformer considered the Mass Effect: Foundation series to be one of the best video game based comic books.
