= Salarian =

Fictional species from Mass Effect

- Mass Effect race
- Major Kirrahe as he appears in the first Mass Effect
- First appearance: Mass Effect: Revelation (2007)
- Created by: BioWare

In-universe information
- Quadrant: Citadel Space
- Home world: Sur'Kesh
- Sub-races: Lystheni
- Affiliation: Citadel Council
- Leader: Dalatrasses; Salarian Union
- Notable members: Mordin Solus, Major Kirrahe

The Salarians (/səˈlɛəriənz/) are a fictional extraterrestrial humanoid species in the Mass Effect multimedia franchise developed by BioWare and published by Electronic Arts. Originally introduced in the 2007 tie-in novel Mass Effect: Revelation, where they are presented as a lizard-like species that speaks quickly, Salarians are an amphibian species with a relatively high metabolism that makes them think, talk, and act faster than most species in the Mass Effect universe. Salarians were designed to be Mass Effect's version of gray aliens, a common archetypal image of an intelligent extraterrestrial non-human creature and a common trope in science fiction.

Within the game's setting, their accelerated metabolism limits their lifespan to roughly 40 years, a lifespan considered short relative to other species in the Mass Effect universe. Salarians are depicted to be a haplodiploid egg-laying society, in which unfertilized eggs produce males and fertilized eggs produce females. Societal norms lead the Salarians to be over 90 percent male, with females usually depicted as being secluded on their home planet, holding positions of power. In the game's backstory, about 2000 years before the events of the first Mass Effect, the Salarians uplifted the Krogan to combat the Rachni, an insectoid species that shares a collective consciousness. Following the defeat of the Rachni, the Krogan rebelled against the rest of the galaxy, prompting the Salarians to develop the genophage, a bioweapon that rendered the Krogan nearly sterile.

Critical reception of the Salarians has generally been positive, with praise for their intelligence, technical prowess, and narrative importance within the franchise, although the absence of Salarian females throughout the games has received some criticism. Their creation of the genophage and their relationship with the Krogan have received substantial analysis, drawing comparisons to colonialism, bioethics, and real-world genetic engineering.

== Concept and design ==
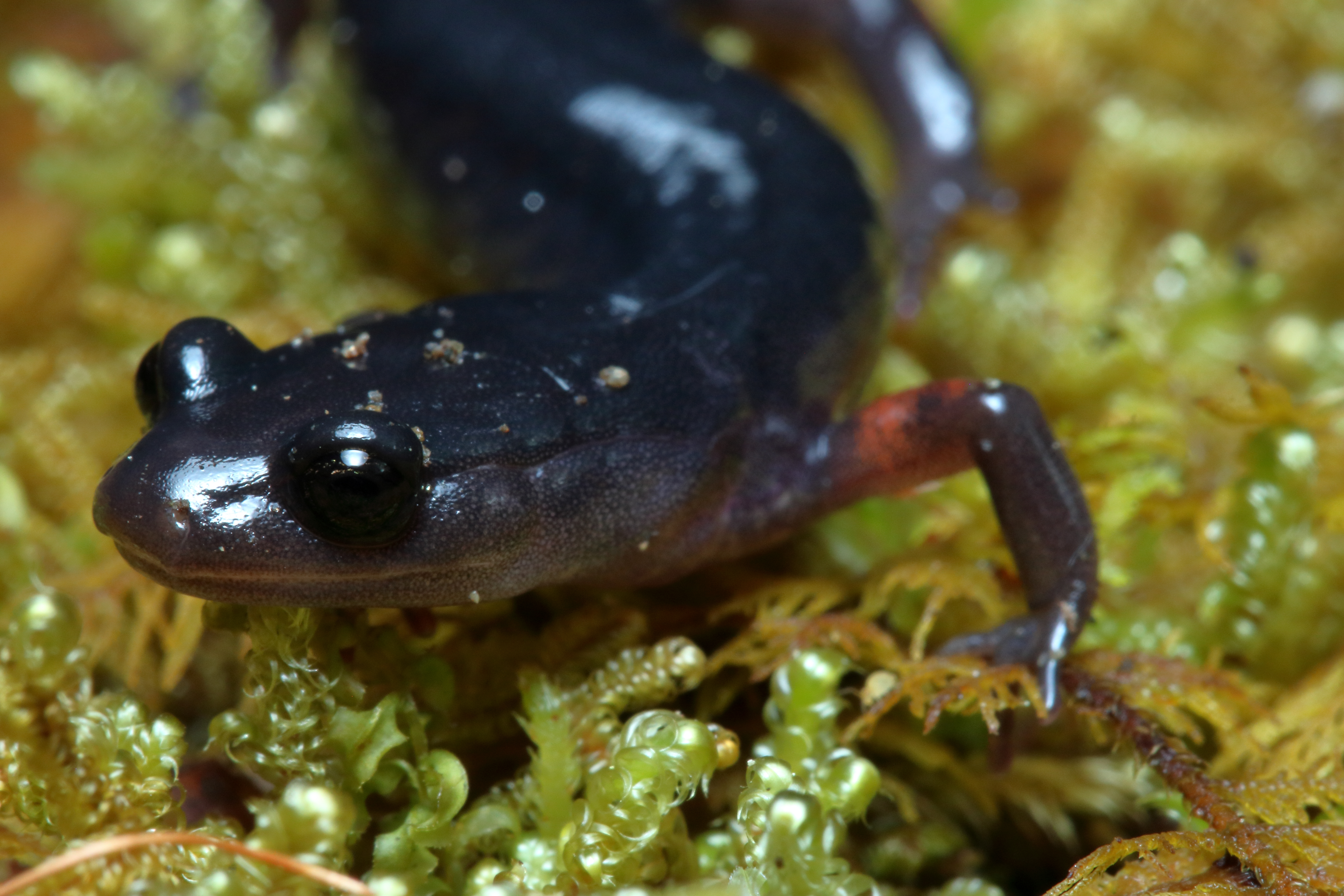
Salamanders served as inspiration for the physical appearance of the species.

According to Mass Effect's art director Derek Watts, the development of each alien species began with the creation of a brief paragraph that outlined the basic characteristics they wanted to give to them. For the Salarians, the design process began with the gray alien science fiction archetype, which was then adapted to fit the narrative and style of the Mass Effect universe. Early on, BioWare brought in Canadian actor Mark Meer to develop how the baseline members of each species would sound, including the Salarians.

To create the physical appearance of the Salarians, the art team was inspired by the appearance of salamanders to make them look "alien and delicate". Associate art director Matt Rhodes cited Japanese cultural influences as a source of inspiration for the Salarians. Salarians were pictured as "warrior poets", a concept that was emphasized by some big dark gray alien eyes to transmit a sense of calmness and tranquility. This approach led to a softer, less threatening appearance when compared to other species such as the Krogan or the Turians. The final facial design included many key aspects associated with gray aliens, including a triangular facial structure, an elongated mouth, and the aforementioned large eyes. To differentiate them from the classic version of the gray alien trope, the team decided to add some horn-like protrusions on top of their heads. Due to animation restrictions, the bodies of most alien races were designed to remain humanoid. For the Salarians, artist Sum Kim introduced a concave chest, and the art team introduced a set of dog-like legs as a defining characteristic. These anatomical features were later incorporated into Salarian clothing design, which was often made to include tubing or structural elements intended to make their chests appear less concave and more similar to the rest of the species in the Mass Effect universe. In an interview with Game Informer, Rhodes drew a parallel between this practice and "a bald man wearing a toupée". Additional elements, such as hoods and circular chest pieces, were incorporated into Salarian ceremonial clothing design. The art team also made several concepts of facial expressions to figure out how Salarian faces would look in their digital acting system.

In designing the Salarian home world of Sur'Kesh for its appearance in Mass Effect 3, the art team wanted to make a planet composed of a lush and humid tropical jungle meant to be the home of an amphibious species. To design the architecture of the planet, the art team found inspiration in a shopping center in Istanbul, with the intention of making the interiors blur the line between the landscape and the structure.

According to former lead character artist Herbert Lowis, during the development of Mass Effect: Andromeda, the team originally played with the idea of adding secondary sexual characteristics to female Salarians, but ultimately rejected it in order to remain consistent with the already established Mass Effect lore. A Salarian party member or "squadmate" was cut during the game's development due to the decision to include personal quests for each companion. Lead writer Mac Walters also cited the already existing presence of a Salarian in the crew of the Tempest, the game's main spaceship and hub, as a reason behind its removal.

== Fictional attributes ==
=== Biology ===
Within the Mass Effect universe, Salarians are depicted as a reptilian-looking amphibious species native to the planet of Sur'Kesh. They are characterized by a relatively fast metabolism that allows them to function on as little as one hour of sleep per day and to speak, think, and make decisions at an accelerated rate. This metabolism is also associated with a comparatively short lifespan, depicted as being of 30 to 40 years, when compared to other species in the setting. The species is further described as employing a haplodiploid reproductive system in which unfertilized eggs become male and fertilized eggs become female. Due to strict societal rules surrounding reproduction, Salarian society is portrayed as over 90 percent male. Salarians are additionally depicted as possessing photographic memory, a characteristic used within the franchise to explain their prominence in intelligence gathering and espionage. The species is represented as largely androgynous.

=== Culture and society ===
In the context of the series' fictional universe, Salarians are characterized by their pragmatism and unsentimentalism. This mindset is depicted as one of the main reasons why Salarians are more willing to undertake complex decisions or sacrifices when deemed necessary for the greater good. The species is also portrayed as the galaxy's main source of scientific advancement, exhibiting a considerable reputation as technological pioneers. Salarians are also shown to experience very little sex drive. Reproduction and egg fertilization are arranged through formal agreements and negotiations rather than emotional relationships solely for reproduction.

The Salarian centralized government, the Salarian Union, is depicted as functioning similarly to how noble families distributed land in medieval Europe. Although males constitute the majority of the population, political power is held by an elite of planet-cloistered Dalatrasses, which are portrayed as a group of female political clan leaders. This is the main narrative reason why high-level political authority is female-dominated, while other sectors are depicted as being predominantly male-dominated. The Salarian military is represented as a relatively small yet highly advanced and equipped with modern weaponry, sensors, and cloaking devices. However, instead of focusing on their military, Salarian society is shown to specialize in intelligence and covert operations rather than conventional warfare. Their primary military intelligence service, the Special Tasks Group (STG), is depicted as consisting of highly trained agents operating in small, independent units tasked with missions in fields such as counterterrorism, reconnaissance, infiltration, and assassination.

=== History ===
In the game's backstory, the Salarians are portrayed as the second species to discover the Citadel, a massive space station that serves as the political and administrative center of Citadel Space, a section of the Milky Way galaxy. Together with the Asari, they founded the Citadel Council, which functions as the primary governing body of the section.

Within their background history, the species is primarily associated with their conflict against the Rachni, a hive-minded species of highly intelligent spacefaring insectoids, as well as the uplifting of the Krogan. More than 2000 years before the events of the first Mass Effect, a group of explorers encountered the Rachni after activating a previously dormant mass relay, one of a network of massive space installations that simplify space travel. After their discovery, the Rachni initiated a galaxy-wide conflict with other races known as the Rachni Wars. After nearly a century of losses, the Salarians play an important role in the uplifting of the Krogan, a race of warmongering reptiles that had destroyed their home planet of Tuchanka in a thermonuclear world war. Their initiative was successful, and the Rachni were driven to extinction by the Krogan. In the aftermath of the war against the Rachni, the Krogan’s rapid growth rate led to exponential population growth, which is described as a primary driver of their subsequent aggressive territorial expansion. This expansionism ultimately led the Krogan to found their own colony on the already colonized Asari world of Lusia, starting a conflict between them and the Citadel Council known as the Krogan Rebellions. As the war between the Krogan and the Turians lingered, the latter sought help from the Salarians to put a definitive end to the conflict. The Salarians manufactured the genophage, a massive biochemical weapon that would render the Krogan nearly sterile. The genophage is described as being ultimately deployed unilaterally by the Turians, resulting in a severe population decline and forcing the Krogan to surrender.

The Salarians also play an important role in the setting's broader backstory, particularly in the creation of the Spectre program, an elite group of agents with few limitations to their methods. A few years before the Krogan Rebellions, a Salarian named Beelo Gurji was accused of using civilians as bait; however, instead of being punished, he was promoted by the Citadel Council. 400 years before humanity's entrance into galactic society, the aggressive-expansionist Batarians bombed the Salarian world of Mannovai.

=== Subspecies ===
The Lystheni, as an offshoot of the Salarians, are mentioned in the novel Mass Effect: Ascension. They are depicted to be unwelcome in Citadel Space and usually live among the Batarians and mercenaries in Omega, a crime-ridden space station built in the crust of a metallic asteroid that appears in Mass Effect 2 and the Mass Effect 3: Omega downloadable content. Lystheni Salarians do not make an appearance in any Mass Effect video game, but modders have discovered and attempted to recover parts of a cut side-quest involving a conflict between the Lystheni and the jellyfish-like Hanar.

== Appearances ==
Salarians were first introduced in the tie-in novel Mass Effect: Revelation as a lizard-like species similar to gray aliens that speak fast; and as one of the races that form the Citadel Council. A representative of the Salarian race holds a permanent seat on the Council. The Salarian councilor plays an important role during proceedings against humanity concerning the illegal development of artificial intelligence, which is prohibited in Citadel Space.

=== Mass Effect ===
Despite the absence of a Salarian squadmate who can accompany Shepard on missions in the original Mass Effect, members of the species are involved in multiple in-game missions. To progress against one of the game's main antagonists in an early main quest, Shepard has to deal with administrator Anoleis, a Salarian executive in charge of a planet's port known as Port Hanshan. On the planet Virmire, Shepard is tasked with assisting Captain Kirrahe, a Salarian STG intelligence officer. There, Saren Arterius, the game's main villain, has conducted experiments on Krogan biology and bioengineered a cure for the genophage. Acting under the authority of the council and in coordination with the Salarian STG, Shepard must assist Kirrahe with destroying a massive Krogan cloning facility that Saren had set up to create a Krogan army, destroying the cure in the process. Kirrahe's fate during the mission depends on the player's actions. During Garrus Vakarian's personal quest, Shepard is tasked with locating a Salarian organ trafficker named Saelon.

=== Mass Effect 2 ===
Mass Effect 2 introduces the franchise's first and sole Salarian squadmate, Mordin Solus. Mordin is a Salarian scientist and ex-STG member who worked on a modification of the Krogan genophage to make it more resilient. Through this character, the player is introduced to the genophage perspective from a Salarian point of view, in contrast to the Krogan one that Urdnot Wrex offered in the first Mass Effect. During Mordin's loyalty mission, a specialized side-quest that the player has to complete in order to gain each squadmate's loyalty, Shepard is tasked with locating Maelon, Mordin's former assistant, who had reportedly been kidnapped on the Krogan home world of Tuchanka. Gradually, it is revealed that Maelon had voluntarily decided to work with the Krogan to try to locate a cure for the genophage through the conduct of brutal experiments on voluntary Krogan. The fate of Maelon and the results of his research depend on player choice. Similar to every other squadmate in Mass Effect 2, Mordin Solus can perish during the "Suicide Mission", the game's final mission.

=== Mass Effect 3 ===
Mass Effect 3 is set during the Reaper War, an ongoing galactic invasion waged by massive, spacefaring synthetic leviathans against the Milky Way races. In response, Shepard initially seeks to secure an alliance between the Turians, the Krogan, and the Salarians. As part of these negotiations, the Krogan leader demands the creation of a cure for the genophage as a condition for their participation. This demand is initially rejected by the Salarian leader, Dalatrass Linron. Ultimately, Shepard is tasked with going to the Salarian home world to rescue a fertile Krogan female. If Captain Kirrahe survived the events of the first Mass Effect, he reappears, now holding the rank of Major, and assists Shepard during their mission on Sur'Kesh. At the facility, Shepard will meet either Mordin Solus or a replacement scientist if Mordin did not survive the events of Mass Effect 2. Together, Shepard then has to repel a concurrent assault by Cerberus, a pro-human xenophobic organization, and rescue the last surviving fertile Krogan female.

Following the completion of the mission on Sur'Kesh, Shepard travels to Tuchanka to cure the genophage. At this stage, the game presents two possible outcomes: Shepard may collaborate with the Salarian scientist and the Krogan leader to successfully cure the genophage, thereby securing Krogan war support; or align themselves with Linron to sabotage the cure, prioritizing Salarian and, depending on the identity of the Krogan leader, potentially retaining Krogan support under false pretenses.

Later in the game, an assassin attempts to murder the Salarian councilor. Whether the councilor survives is dependent on choices made in the previous games, and is usually determined by Thane Krios intervening to save them. However, if Thane died in Mass Effect 2 and Major Kirrahe survived the events of the first Mass Effect, he will instead save the councilor's life. If neither survived, the councilor will die.

=== Mass Effect: Andromeda ===
The Salarians are one of the races selected to lead their own ark to the Andromeda Galaxy. In Mass Effect: Andromeda, arks are a set of gigantic spaceships designed to traverse the distance between the Milky Way and the Andromeda Galaxy. Similar to the Asari and Turian arks, the Salarian ark never managed to reach the Nexus, an enormous space station that had also been sent on its way to Andromeda. Unlike the other arks, the Salarian ark is not encountered by the player via side-quests, but after the end of the main quest "Hunting the Archon". Once Ryder boards the ark, they meet Pathfinder Raeka, the ark's leader. After fighting off some Kett enemies that had also boarded the ark, the player must decide whether they should save the life of Raeka or the lives of some Krogan scouts. In the game, the player also meets Kallo Jath, who pilots the game's main spaceship, the Tempest.

== Reception and analysis ==
=== Reception ===
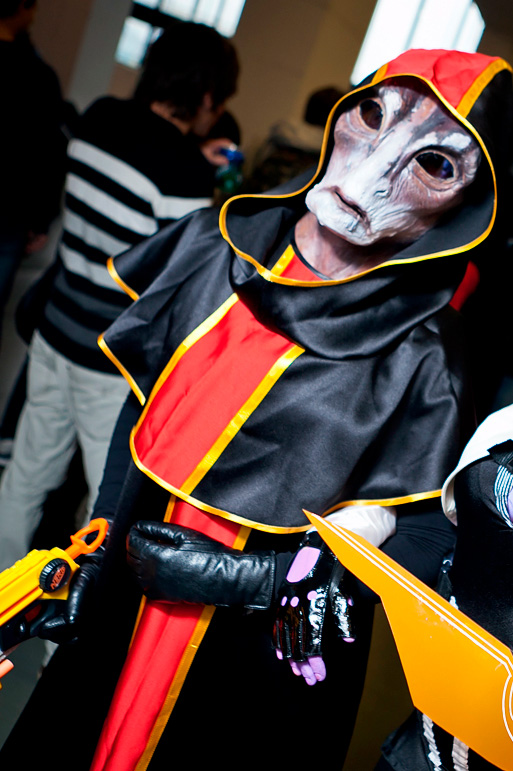
A Mass Effect fan at AVA Expo 2013, cosplaying as a Salarian character.

Salarian characters in the Mass Effect trilogy, especially Mordin Solus, have received critical acclaim from both journalists and players. Major Kirrahe's speech in the first Mass Effect has been quoted as one of Mass Effect's most iconic moments. Dr. Saelon was listed as one of gaming's "most magnificently murderous medical practitioners" in David Houghton's list for GamesRadar+.

The Salarian species has been well-received by critics and media outlets, praised for its intelligence, technical prowess, and importance within the Mass Effect universe. David Caballero of Screen Rant ranked the Salarians #5 on his list of the best alien races in the franchise, noting their unpopular actions, arrogance, and treacherous behavior. Sean Murray of TheGamer ranked the Salarians #2, noting their relatively fast metabolism that makes them faster than most species in the Mass Effect universe, their "knowledge is power" philosophy, and their matriarchal society. In contrast, Shubhankar Parijat of GamingBolt placed them second-to-last on his list, criticizing their appearance, unusual-sounding nature, and superiority complex; yet still describing them as "one of the most formidable and respectable alien races" in Mass Effect, describing them as "a culture of geniuses". In his critique of Mass Effect: Andromeda, Timothy J. Seppala of Engadget argued the relationship between the Krogan and the Salarians was an example of the Mass Effect trilogy's richest, most nuanced world building. Ari Notis, writing for Kotaku, criticized the fact that players are forced to kill an unnamed Salarian in Mass Effect, arguing that by being forced to leave him behind, the game limits player choice and agency.

The lack of Salarian females in the Mass Effect series has received some criticism. Alex Raymond, writing for Gamecritics.com, noted that their absence reinforces the notion that the traits associated with the Salarians, such as intelligence and scientific aptitude, are traditionally male-coded. Raymond also compared the seclusion of most Salarian females, who are largely confined to their homeworld, to them being in the "Salarian kitchen", stating that the games conveniently evade having Salarian females present in it by having them hold positions of power.

=== Analysis ===
The Salarian background history, including their interrelationship with the Krogan, has been examined through a post-colonialist lens. Amy M. Green drew comparisons between the Salarians and historical instances in which dominant powers subdued Indigenous peoples in conquered lands, reaching the conclusion that the Salarians destabilize the Krogan by intervening and evade responsibility for their actions. In contrast, Eamon Reid discussed the involvement of the Salarian Union in the uplifting of the Krogan, arguing that politics in the Mass Effect trilogy cannot be analyzed only through "neoliberal, imperialist, and colonialist dynamics". Reid further discussed the Salarians, examining the Salarian uplifting of the Krogan through the use of the term in David Brin's Uplift universe and comparing their actions to those associated with the Spanish Inquisition, drawing on the works of Charles W. Mills. In a separate analysis written for Kotaku, Sebastian Alvarado of Stanford University drew parallels between the Salarian creation of the genophage and historical practices of forced sterilization enforced by colonial powers.

The Salarian creation of the genophage has been compared to real-world genetic engineering practices. In a video uploaded by GameSpot, the Salarian development of the genophage was compared to a gene-therapy technique being developed to get rid of mosquitoes. Similar comparisons have been made by scientific commentators, who noted the similarities between the genophage and genetic interventions tested on mosquitoes in Florida. Sebastian Alvarado suggested that a similar biological weapon could be created in the real world, given that certain types of enzymes are known to possess the ability to cut DNA.

Salarian asexuality was analyzed in The Bloomsbury Handbook of Sex and Sexuality in Game Studies to argue that it could provide storytelling opportunities beyond "heteronormativity" in the Mass Effect universe.
