= Universe of Mass Effect =

Fictional universe of a video game series

The Art of the Mass Effect Universe, a 2012 publication which contains concept art and commentary by BioWare staff on the characters, locations, vehicles, and weapons of the Mass Effect universe.

The Mass Effect media franchise, developed by BioWare and published by Electronic Arts, is set in the distant future where various extraterrestrial species coexist with humanity. The developers created extensive background lore for the universe of Mass Effect and its alien species, with detailed explanations documenting the complex relationships between the universe's various factions and the setting's phenomena from a scientific perspective. The developers were inspired and influenced by numerous fantasy and science fiction works, as well as real world cultural and scientific concepts. Dark energy, a form of energy theorized to massively affect the universe, forms a key part of the franchise's concept and background.

The first three main series games are set in the Milky Way galaxy and follow Commander Shepard, a human special forces soldier who discovers an imminent threat to the galactic community in the form of the Reapers, an ancient collective of sentient synthetic starships which harvest all spaceflight-era organic civilizations as part of a repeating cycle that spans millennia. The fourth game in the series is a standalone sequel following a group of settlers who are members of the Andromeda Initiative colonizing the Andromeda Galaxy. The original trilogy has overall been both commercially successful and critically acclaimed, and the Mass Effect setting has been praised by critics for the believability and depth of its design, lore and narrative themes. The Mass Effect brand has since expanded into a franchise which encompasses novels, comic books, mobile games, an animated film, and a 3D theme park ride, all of which are centered on other characters as protagonists.

== Concept and design ==
“I don't think you can really talk about the Mass Effect universe without talking about dark energy. It's one of those great elements that fascinated us, as designers and developers, because it is something that actually sort of exists in our world, at least theoretically. This sort of mystical fifth energy, that in some ways binds the universe together. But in the stories, it's critical because you know, it's in everything. It's in everything from our Mass Relays, to the way we travel, to our weapons, to biotics. It really is the thing that makes Mass Effect, Mass Effect. So in that sense, I can't imagine a Mass Effect experience without it.”

— Mac Walters, Mass Effect Legendary Edition director

The Bioware team was inspired by early space exploration games such as Starflight and Star Control, according to Bioware founder Ray Muzyka. Writer Mike Laidlaw explained that Star Control II heavily influenced the worldbuilding of the Mass Effect series, especially its exploration sequences. Mass Effect was also influenced by diverse and eclectic visual references, from the work of Spanish neo-futurist architect Santiago Calatrava to electron microscope imagery of insects. Artwork by American illustrator Syd Mead in particular represents a significant visual influence for the architecture and living conditions of intergalactic society for the Mass Effect setting, such as the Citadel space station.

The “geography” of the Mass Effect universe is a blend of fictional concepts and realism. The imagery for the setting's astronomical objects is inspired by real-life photographs like wide field Hubble Space Telescope images or shots taken from space shuttles, and real-life locations were included wherever possible to ground the setting as an extension of astronomy. As the Mass Effect universe was inspired by the procedurally generated galaxy of Star Control II, project director Casey Hudson created a spreadsheet in Microsoft Excel that could generate planetary data, including its name, surface temperature, distance from a star, and other statistical information. The developmental team used the generated information to compile lists of viable planets that could be used in the video games, and incorporated the information by adding a predetermined number of planets from the lists into each individual star system on the galactic map, which are mapped out using a proprietary tool within the game engine. Lore for the individual planets was delegated to the writing team, who would seed information throughout the setting. According to game director Mac Walters, the sheer volume of information generated is difficult to follow even for the developmental team, but the "little bits of mystery" also serves to make the world "seem so much deeper and richer", with the potential for some of it to be utilized for possible future stories.

Newcomers to the galactic community, humanity's iteration in the Mass Effect series is meant to be only fairly far in the future enough to be new but not unrecognizable. Through standardizing the different concept art for their clothing, a "common visual language" was found for the human characters. The standard look for all attire for members of the Cerberus organization is derived from the designs for the armor and clothing of Jacob Taylor, a companion character in Mass Effect 2. Some involved fully armored looks, while others had only cloth, or a mix of cloth and armor. During the development of the original trilogy, which was released during the seventh generation of video game consoles, all component armor pieces for a character model had to be fixed onto a single piece of geometry as the developers only had a limited number of polygons to work with. As a result of technological advancements during the development cycle for Mass Effect Andromeda, the developers could place underarmor closer to the body with interchangeable armor pieces that sit on top of it, and were able to limit the amount of stretching to avoid the "pajama armor" effect.

Influences for the series' non-human characters range from real world flora and fauna to visual media like Hellboy or the 1927 film Metropolis. The team hoped to create a setting with the same sense of history as Star Control II, giving each alien race a compelling motivation that enriches the galaxy. The worldbuilding of Mass Effect references the Star Control series with the Krogan-Rachni war, the lost Prothean civilization, and the sentience-harvesting Reapers. The Reapers and their progenitors, the Leviathans, were also inspired by the cosmic horror and Cthulhu Mythos deities from the literary works of H.P. Lovecraft. The salarians are intended to be Mass Effect's answer to the "gray alien" trope, the archetypal image of intelligent extraterrestrial life. The geth are meant to represent an example of the dangers of artificial intelligence within the context of the conflict between organic and synthetic intelligence, a central overarching theme in the Mass Effect franchise.

"What is the visual language for their clothing? What's the shape of their face? What's iconic? Is this going to work with our conversation system? Are these characters going to be able to show emotion? Are people going to get attached to them? And these are all things you think of as you go through the phases."

— Derek Watts, Mass Effect art director

Prior to the commencement of the concept phase for an alien species, the art and design team would look to the writing team for direction. They would ask for a short written paragraph containing a description of the species, their background, and specific but concise details on what they require for the creature. Phase one begins when the paragraph description is given to the concept artists, who are given a lot of freedom to explore ideas about the subject alien species. Once a few concepts have been completed, the team would attempt to move on from phase one by honing on a few ideas, and start working through multiple phases which may increase depending on the idea's complexity. The goal for the artists was to keep honing in and defining the final design, until they come up with something that feels interesting and unique yet grounded and believable.

Once the concept of a particular species is finalized, creation of the character model would begin, where a lot of "back and forth" took place in order to refine character models with high polygon counts. According to Watts, "doing a concept is a piece of art itself, but also building a character is a piece of art", as he recalled that some ideas that worked on paper ended up not working well on a 3-D model. The character model would next be textured and prepared for inclusion into the game. The animation team gets involved early in the process to make sure everything works correctly. Most aliens had to fit into a humanoid skeleton for animation purposes; for example, the batarian's appearance is originally based on a previous design intended for something else, and had "flaps" on the side of their heads; however, in order to wear equipment they had to be changed to a human shape. Similarly, more "outrageous" designs for species like the elcor were made, although modelling and animation constraints would go on to effect their final design. Plans to include a non-humanoid party member never materialized as significant developmental costs would be incurred otherwise.

For many of the races, there was some difficulty in making the characters appear more visually distinct; though team members could add a bit of a visual variation, the faces would be alien enough that these nuances would not be as noticeable to the human eye. To overcome this, art director Derek Watts came up with the idea of different face paints and tattoos for many of the races as additional features. BioWare realized they would be unable to make both male and female versions of all the races due to budgetary concerns, which in part led to the development of the asari as a mono-gendered species. The salarians are intentionally designed to be an androgynous in terms of appearance, while female character models for the krogan and turians were only introduced by Mass Effect 3.

Mass Effect was envisioned as a trilogy from the very beginning as part of the developers' efforts to create a memorable story. Early versions of the first game's plot involved a conflict between humanity and the batarians, originally conceived as a "warmongering" group of "small bat-like creatures". Led by the villainous Saren, the batarians intended to steal the technology of the "Nazari", which was at that point the name of the extinct race that preceded the contemporary races and created most of the technology. Humanity were to be depicted with an inherent ability to access and use the technology of the Nazari, in spite of their lack of technological knowledge; this makes them an important race, drawing much attention from the other species. It would then turn out that humanity were in fact originally a slave race to these Nazari, which explains their innate affinity for the lost technology. This idea was later discarded, with the focus of the narrative turned to the tension between synthetic and organic life and the batarians were replaced with the geth as antagonists to strengthen the human versus machine conflict. The batarians were later redesigned as a four-eyed humanoid species and repurposed as the villains of Bring Down the Sky, a piece of downloadable content for the first Mass Effect.

For the development of subsequent sequels, the developers continued to reference fan reaction to well-received features such as loyalty missions or popular characters, whether from player feedback or from research into fan labor-driven activities. The geth were originally intended to be sidelined within the trilogy's overarching plot following the conclusion of the first Mass Effect; due to the very positive player feedback to the geth, BioWare continued to explore the geth's role for subsequent sequels in response. This had the side-effect of reducing focus on other concurrent plot lines, including that of the insectoid rachni. A proposed alien race's predicted potential for cosplay by the series' fandom based on their character designs was also taken into consideration whenever the final decision is to be made for inclusion.

== Premise ==
=== Mass Effect Discovery ===
In 2148, an alien artifact had been discovered on Mars xenoarcheological digsite; revealing that humanity had been studied by an interstellar species (known as the Protheans) since the Cro-Magnon period. Research of the artifact, in addition to providing new technologies for humanity, led to the breakthrough of "mass effect fields" as the core in-universe scientific principle used to explain the franchises's superluminal travel and communication, artificial gravity, and biotic technologies. A further discovery of Pluto's moon Charon as a "mass relay", an alien construct that is capable of transporting any ships faster than light to a nearby mass relay, creating an interlocking "interstellar highway" network on the galactic scale. The efficiency of this relay network is such that is often economically faster and cheaper to transport goods and people to the other side of the galaxy, than traveling to adjacent neighboring star systems. The mass relays work by creating a "mass effect", the production of dark energy from a reaction with a dark matter substance known as Element Zero (or "eezo") to slingshot spacecraft to the next relay. Element Zero is found to also react with biological entities, giving them limited powers known as "biotics" that evoke the mass effect on a much smaller scale.

=== First Contact ===
Ten years after leaving the Sol system, humanity makes its first contact with an extraterrestrial species, the turians, which erupted into the First Contact War. Though casualties are small on both sides, hostilities were ultimately interrupted by the Citadel Council. Humanity is then welcomed into the collective community of extraterrestrial peoples who live in Citadel space and accept the Council's authority, and learn that the artifacts, mass relays, and the Citadel space station, are all that remains of the Protheans, who are believed to have been the pre-eminent civilization in the Milky Way galaxy who created most of its technology, but have since disappeared tens of thousands of years ago. The Citadel Council welcomes humanity into the Citadel community, providing them with a Systems Alliance embassy and allowing individual members to join the Citadel Security Forces (C-SEC), despite other client species having waited for such a privilege for some time. The Citadel Council soon invites a human to join the Office of Special Tactics and Reconnaissance (SPECTRES), elite extrajudicial law enforcement entity that can limit sapient rights, supersede laws, use both espionage and force, and operate independently from governmental oversight, cutting through red tape, bureaucracy, and logistics that might otherwise impede the completions of their assignments.

=== Events of Original Mass Effect trilogy ===
Over the course of the trilogy, the galactic community come to learn that the Protheans were mostly wiped out over 50,000 years prior by the Reapers, sentient starships that normally occupy the void between the Milky Way and the Andromeda Galaxy. The Reapers appear every 50,000 years with the sole purpose of wiping out emergent organic civilizations as well as any evidence of their own existence, but deliberately leave behind technology which ensure that the organic civilizations of the next cycle develop according to their predetermined specifications. Unlike their predecessors in previous cycles, the Protheans had learned of the Reapers and prepared for their arrival, though they were unable to prevent their own extermination by the Reapers. Their preparations survive into the next cycle, in the form of the Crucible. The Mass Effect series starts as the nascent appearances of the Reapers in this cycle have occurred, beginning with the indoctrination of a rogue turian Spectre, an influential asari Matriarch, and a "heretic" faction of geth who broke away from the Geth Consensus to further their plans of return.

The Collectors began abducting entire human colonies by the events of Mass Effect 2. Shepard, who had been killed in action during a surprise attack by a Collector ship at the beginning of Mass Effect 2, is reconstructed and revived by Cerberus in the year 2185, following a complex cybernetic engineering process which lasted two years. Shepard sets out to assemble a team of skilled individuals from across the galaxy for a suicide mission into the Omega Four mass relay to stop the Collectors from harvesting more human colonies on behalf of the Reapers. Near the Omega Four relay is Omega space station, which lies outside of Citadel jurisdiction. Ruled by the asari pirate queen Aria T'Loak, Omega serves as the de facto trade capital of the Terminus Systems confederation—a disparate collective of uncharted space, independent states, corporate fiefdoms and pirate domains—whose only uniting principle is the unanimous refusal to acknowledge Citadel jurisdiction. It is also popular as an alternative hub for alien species who are unwelcome in Citadel controlled space, or an avenue for criminal activities which contravenes Citadel laws and regulations.

Immediately after the defeat of the Collectors and the destruction of the incomplete Proto-Reaper they were constructing, the Reapers are shown traveling to the Milky Way galaxy from dark space at the ending of Mass Effect 2. The Reaper invasion has commenced by the beginning of Mass Effect 3, with the war's earliest fronts taking place in batarian and human space. Shepard is present on Earth when the Reapers first arrived, and later escapes the human homeworld on the Normandy SR-2 in order to rally the rest of the galactic community against the Reaper threat, and find a solution that will break the Reaper-imposed cycle of harvesting organic species forever.

=== Events of Mass Effect: Andromeda ===
Founded in 2176 by Jien Garson, the Andromeda Initiative is a civilian multi-species project created to send scientists, explorers and colonists placed in cryosleep within massive intergalactic arkships on a one-way trip from the Milky Way Galaxy to settle in the Andromeda Galaxy. The Initiative's main objective is to establish a permanent presence in the Heleus Cluster, a seemingly resource-rich frontier of Andromeda, and eventually create a reliable route between both galaxies. Research on the ODSY drive and its core components, which are essential technology for the Initiative's goal to undertake long distance travel to the Andromeda galaxy, was underway by the time of the attack on the Citadel by Sovereign and the geth, the events of which spurred the Initiative to fast track its plans to depart from the Milky Way galaxy.

== Factions of Mass Effect ==
=== Humanity ===
As the newest member state to join the Citadel space community by the events of the original trilogy, humanity tend to be underestimated, held in suspicion or looked down upon. While biotics are common amongst most alien species (like the asari) they are rare in humans and often require an implant in addition to decades of training to channel and improve upon the skill. Two factions dominate humanity: the Earth Systems Alliance, and Cerberus; each representing humanity's nobliest aspects and darkest tendencies, respectively.

Alien's are generally alarmed by humanity's ambition, individualism, rapid technological advancement, galactic proliferation within a single human-generation, tendency to prioritize human interests above non-humans, and their regard for "anything a few years old as obsolete". Anti-human sentiments are against the quick establishment of the human embassy on the Citadel (within a decade; whereas other member species and factions have waited for hundreds, if not thousands of years) and the perceived appeasement-hypocrisy of human-sympathetic members of the Citadel Council for placing humanity on the Council and establishing the first Human-Spectre.

Humanity's opinions regarding aliens varies across broad political spectrum from isolationism to globalism: on Earth, there is concern about how humanity is unfairly treated by these other species, and nationalistic pro-human groups advocating militarism, xenophobia, and a "humanity-first" supremacist agenda begin to appear; on fringe colonies, locals are ambivalent, being preoccupied with daily frontier survival in often hostile environments or security against piracy raids; and "spacers", who may have spent their entire lives residing alongside aliens within starship installations, and generally adopt favorable opinions about multiculturalism.

==== Earth Systems Alliance ====
Earth Systems Alliance Space is a bordered by Citadel Council Space and the Attican Traverse. The discovery of the Charon Relay triggered a "gold rush", and fierce rivalry persists amongst Earth's nations, as they compete for untapped resources and unclaimed colonial land rights. Humanity's aggressive expansionism triggered conflicts with the Turian Hierarchy and the Batarian Hegemony. Earth has increased its holdings more than tenfold since, pushing into the Attican Traverse and has enveloped the heart of batarian space.

Earth is still a collection of independent nation-states, but their dealing on a galactic scale are unified through the Systems Alliance. A supranational decentralized civilian government, the Earth Systems Alliance member nations retain their individual sovereignty back on Earth, with London as the Alliance's de jure capital. The developed Sol System planets contain 90% of the human population and are administered by the United Nations, while the underdeveloped Alliance colonies and "spacers" are 9% and 1%, respectively, governed by a parliament based at Arcturus Station, the most developed extrasolar colony which also serves as the Alliance's de facto capital and a nexus of the military power projection. Since gaining a seniority seat on the Council, 2.5 million "spacer" humans currently lived on The Citadel (before Reaper invasion), and the Citadel Human Embassy leverages its equal partnership status to further human interests and holds legitimate jurisdiction over humans residing outside of Alliance Space. Among the Citadel species, the Alliance is considered a sovereign interstellar nation and no other species has right of oversight into Alliance affairs. Non-Citadel species hold the Alliance and the Council with equal disdain.

Headquartered on Vancouver, Earth, the Systems Alliance Command is the primary military, exploratory, and scientific agency that protects human interests and represents humanity in interstellar politics. It was originally formed as a limited peacekeeping force by multiple human nations—to operate under the mandate by the United Nations—to safeguard humanity as it expanded to new colonies through the mass relay. When the Citadel Human Embassy, Alliance Parliamentary, United Nations Prime Ministry, and the line of succession all decapitated during the Reaper invasion, the Systems Alliance Military has acted as the emergency governing body of the human species at large for a time. Despite having a volunteer force of only 1% of humanity's total population, the Systems Alliance's power projection is able to match, if not outright exceed, any known non-Reaper military force in the Milky Way galaxy.

==== Cerberus ====
A stateless clandestine organization—consisting of a system of independent, compartmentalized rogue black-ops cell networks, shell corporations, and paramilitaries—appears as recurring antagonists in the series. Cerberus advocates extremist anthropocentric militarism and a ruthless, intelligence-driven, "humanity-first" supremacist shadow government. Cerberus is officially sanctioned and classified as a violent non-state actor by both the Alliance and the Council governments. In Mass Effect 2, Cerberus are depicted as anti-villains who resurrected and forms an alliance with Commander Shepard against the human-abducting Collectors. In Mass Effect 3 during the Reaper Wars, they become a fifth column working against Shepard's attempts to destroy the Reapers, as the Illusive Man wishes to control them instead and consequently elevate humanity's domination.

=== Milky Way-galaxy alien species ===
Besides the Reapers, numerous sentient alien races were introduced in the first Mass Effect and its tie-in prequel novel Mass Effect: Revelation, with three enjoying dominant political status within the galactic community. Various artificial intelligence entities and animal species such as the varren, the monkey-esque pyjaks and the gigantic worm-like Thresher Maws are also encountered throughout the franchise's media.

==== Citadel species ====
- The Asari are a mono-gendered humanoid species from the eezo-rich world of Thessia, who are naturally inclined towards biotics. The Asari have a universal pansexual orientation and may reproduce with any gender of any species using their biotic ability to mind meld. Due to this process and a specific code in their DNA, any children they have will also be Asari no matter who or what they reproduced with. While their society is one of the most stable ones in the galaxy, their reproduction ability has led to some tension between purebred Asari and half-bred Asari. The Asari themselves closely resemble female humans and use feminine pronouns. Asari go through three stages of life and are capable of living for over a thousand years. The asari are depicted as the most politically and culturally influential of all the Milky Way races within the original trilogy.
- The Salarians are a warm-blooded amphibian species with a hyperactive metabolism from Sur'Kesh, and are known for their relatively short lifespans compared to other races in the galactic community. Salarians are generally known for their observational capability and non-linear thinking, which manifests as an aptitude for research and espionage. The Salarians are known for their covert ops organization, the Special Tasks Group (STG), on which the Council's Spectre organization is based.
- The Turians are a bipedal avian species with an exoskeleton from Palaven. Their biological makeup is different from that of most other species, and are culturally rooted in a militaristic society. The Turians are the first alien species to have come into contact with humanity, which inadvertently sparked a brief but vicious conflict known as the First Contact War which was eventually de-escalated after intervention from the Citadel Council.
- The Krogan, a warlike and physically robust species in decline due to the Genophage, a viral-weapon deployed on their homeworld Tuchanka which is designed to sterilize the Krogan species and suppress their naturally high birthrate. They hold a deep resentment towards the Salarians for creating the Genophage as well as the Turians who deployed it.
- The Quarians are an immuno-deficient species with a nomadic culture of technologically savvy humanoid beings who originally created the Geth but were driven out of their homeworld Rannoch following a revolt by their creations. Most similar to the Turians in terms of biological makeup, the Quarians are never seen outside of their environmental suits due to their weak immune systems from living primarily in space.
- The Elcor are a species of hulking quadrupeds from a high-gravity world named Dekunna, and their deliberate and conservative psychology is an evolved response to an environment where a fall can be lethal. The Elcor communicate among themselves mainly through scent, slight movements, and other forms of body language. As a result, the Elcor prefix their sentences with the intended emotion for clarity when communicating with other species as their speech patterns come across as monotone and difficult to comprehend.
- The Hanar, an overly polite and philosophically inclined species of jellyfish-like entities from the ocean world Kahje, who worship the Protheans as their progenitors with religious fervor. The Hanar communicate using highly developed patterns of bioluminescence, which is translated by other species via machine assistance.

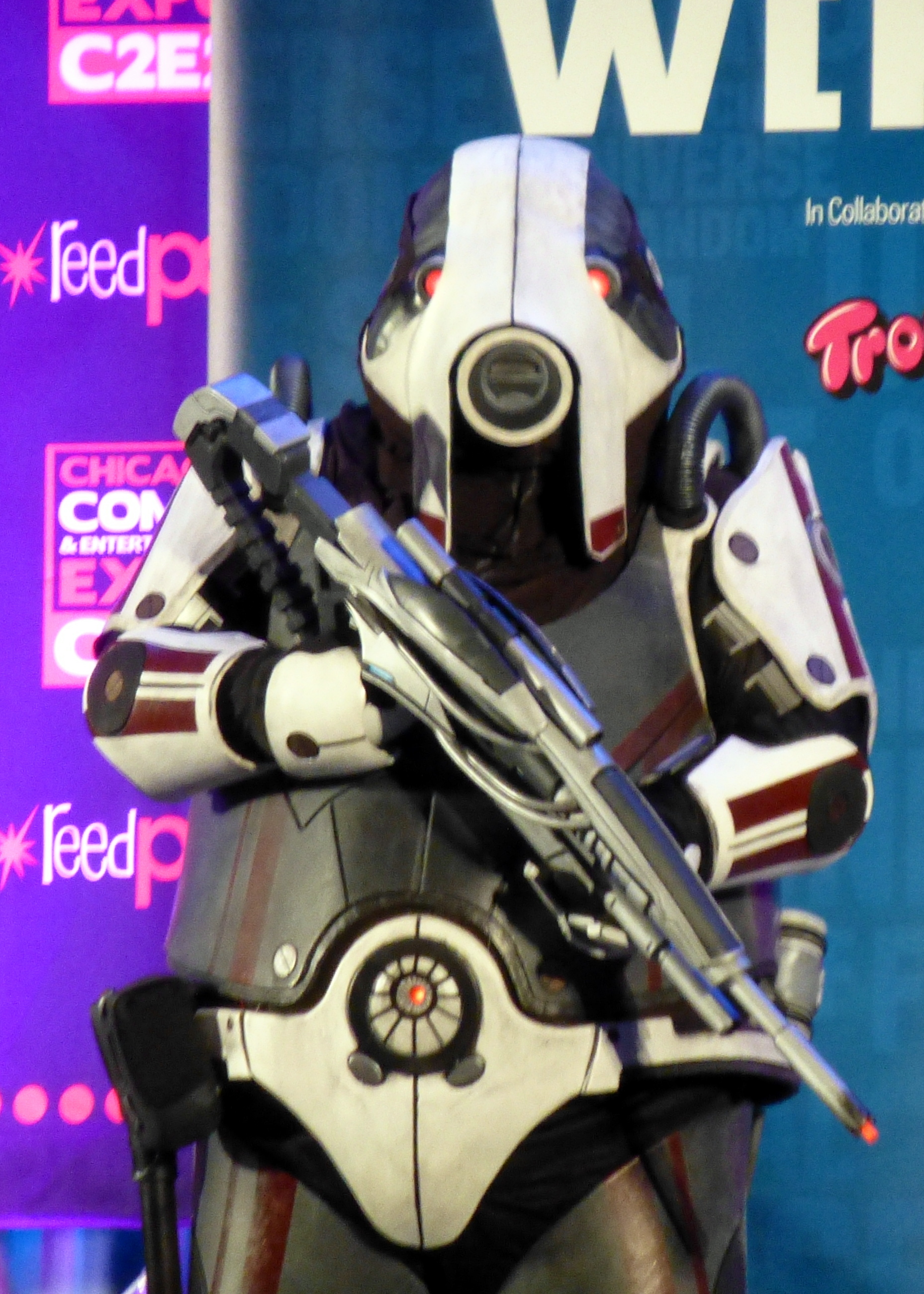
The volus, although featured as playable characters in the multiplayer mode of Mass Effect 3, mostly make their influence felt through trade and commerce.

- The Volus are an ammonia-breathing species who are known to be aggressive traders and industrialists with a keen grasp of exchange and finance. The Volus always wear environmental suits outside of their high pressure homeworld of Irune.

==== Non-Citadel species ====
- The geth are a networked collective of AI programs which usually occupy "mobile platforms" made from flexible synthetic material. When multiple geth programs are brought together, they are capable of forming a "consensus" to systematically coordinate and share their processing work with each other, which free up cycles for more advanced forms of reasoning and make them capable of more complicated or nuanced tasks. The geth are the most common recurring antagonists in the first Mass Effect, varying in size and power from little bi-pedal, gun toting robots all of the way up to a massive walker known as Colossus.
- The rachni are an insectoid race of creatures connected by a hive mind, long thought to be extinct following their extermination by the krogan.
- The batarians are an isolationist people native to the planet Khar'shan, who are notorious for their piracy as well as their active opposition to humanity's colonization activities around the galaxy. They are the only species in the game to openly engage in slavery, having frequently raided human settlements to capture slave labor and later protesting against slavery prohibitions on cultural grounds, making them frequent antagonists for the System Alliance.

Mass Effect 2 and its downloadable content introduce several races to the setting, with varying importance in its plot.

- The Collectors are an enigmatic four-eyed insectoid race from a realm beyond the mysterious Omega Four mass relay, where no ship ever return. They were widely dismissed as myths within the Mass Effect universe, but are in fact the deformed remnants of the Prothean race. They are known to conduct trade of hyper-advanced technology in the Terminus Systems in exchange for living samples from various species.
- The drell, a reptilian species originally from the barren world of Rakhana. They serve the hanar as part of a symbiotic relationship called The Compact.
- The vorcha, a highly aggressive and resilient species from Heshtok with powerful regenerative abilities.
- The yahg, a large predator species with unrivaled perceptiveness and mental adaptability from the world of Parnack. This species is quarantined to its home world for massacring the council’s first contact teams. Despite this, yahg can be seen in both Mass Effect 2 and Mass Effect 3. A member of the species has adopted the guise of the Shadow Broker by the events of Lair of the Shadow Broker.

Mass Effect 3 introduces several Reaper-corrupted versions of the galaxy's races as enemy units. Javik, the last living Prothean, is featured in the From Ashes DLC pack. The Leviathans, an ancient species of colossal aquatic beings who created the AI entity known as the Catalyst, which in turn created the Reapers in the image of its creators, are first introduced in the Leviathan DLC pack.

=== Andromeda-galaxy alien species ===
Mass Effect: Andromeda introduces two other sapient organic races:

- The kett, a hostile militaristic species with dense formations of bone growing externally as armor protrusions on their bodies, who regularly attack settlements throughout the Andromeda galaxy. They see all other species as inferior primitives and abduct them to be remade into variations of kett through a process called "exaltation" which they see as bringing the other species to a superior level of existence.
- The angara, an emotionally expressive species native to the Heleus Cluster in the Andromeda galaxy, who are dependent on sunlight for sustenance. By the events of Andromeda, the angara have been waging a decades long war of resistance against the kett.

== Reception ==
The series' setting has garnered a mostly positive reception from commentators. GamesRadar praised the setting's Milky Way galaxy as "so well-constructed that it felt like a decades-old franchise" and its presentation "a high-water mark for video games as a story-telling medium." Similarly, Evan Narcisse enjoyed the "family secrets, tribal grudge matches, and interplanetary political turnabout" depicted throughout the original trilogy, describing them as memorable moments where it felt like players could change lives in both minor or major ways. Kyle Munkittrick from Gizmodo argued that Mass Effect is the most important science fiction universe of the contemporary generation, and that it overshadowed that of other established science fiction franchises due to the depth of its medium as a video game, its message which embraces diversity and pluralism, and its philosophy which meaningfully reflects on the human condition as well as society as a whole. Munkittrick emphasized the significance of Mass Effect as the "first blockbuster franchise in the postmodern era to directly confront a godless, meaningless universe indifferent to humanity". Referencing Munkittrick's observations, Erik Henriksen from the Portland Mercury said what the developers accomplished with their setting is "pretty extraordinary" in spite of its inherent flaws, with the first two games ambitiously and smartly pairing "brave, big-idea genre fiction with visceral thrills and strong characters". Cian Maher from TheGamer said Mass Effect has one of the most fascinating universes in the history of video games, and credited the series' detailed and well-written codex entries that set the rules for the setting and ultimately gave it a convincing degree of verisimilitude. Peter Suderman from Vox noted that while part of the video game series' appeal for players is its fully realized science fiction universe filled with "complex political machinations and a web of long-simmering alien rivalries", the series' commitment to small talk or banter with all sorts of non-player characters through the in-game conversation system is also instrumental in getting players emotionally invested.

Sara Mitchell from NASA's Blueshift blog, produced by the Astrophysics Science Division at the Goddard Space Flight Center, praised the setting for its "impressive level of realism" and noted that much of the in-game imagery for astronomical objects look like it is lifted from a NASA press release. From an academic perspective, Joshua and Ita Irizarry described the Mass Effect universe to be a "landmark entry in the relatively brief history of video games as well as a lucrative topic for speculation, discussion, and analysis".

The alien races of Mass Effect have received acclaim. Justin Carter from Syfy Wire noted that while the original trilogy featured humanity's ascension to galactic prominence as its main narrative, the setting's various alien species were the one aspect that "stole the show". While the asari, the krogan, the quarians and the turians have been subject to significant coverage which discuss their specific roles within the setting at length, some of Mass Effect's more unusual races, such as the elcor and the hanar, have also received coverage which is predominantly positive. Several critics are particularly fond of the elcor. For example, the Official Xbox Magazine declared the elcor to be the best new species of 2007. Commentators have lauded the elcor's speech patterns and peculiar behavior as a good source of humor and comic relief, although Hollander Cooper from GamesRadar lamented that the elcor are underutilised within the series.

=== Analysis ===
A number of social science topics within the context of the Mass Effect universe have been explored in articles published in academic journals. In his analysis of the series' characters from the perspective of disability studies, Adan Jerreat-Poole observed that biotics represent the series' version of "science-as-magic", a reminder of the inhuman nature of a biotic individual's physiology as the embodiment of "a merging of organic and inorganic materials", which invokes the exhibitions of biological rarities in world history and the spectacle of “extraordinary bodies" as termed by Rosemarie Garland-Thomson, an expert in disability studies. David Callahan analyzed racial and cultural tensions among Mass Effect's galactic community, and drew comparisons to multiculturalism in Canada. Eva Zekany from Central European University researched the depiction of interspecies romance within the setting as well as fan reaction to the presentation of said content.

Luke Willcocks from the University of Leicester analyzed the hypothetical properties of Element Zero from a real world scientific basis. He observed that while the asari most closely resemble humans in terms of biology, their blood color is markedly different. He suggested that the logical explanation is because asari blood contains a property that causes its violet-blue coloration at a molecular scale. Willcocks pointed out that in all in-universe depictions of Element Zero, such as the generation of mass effect fields by starships and biotics, it is always portrayed in a shade of blue. He concluded that Element Zero is the source of the blue coloration of asari blood, and since an electrical current could pass through it, the substance is theoretically a metallic semiconductor.

== See also ==
- Dark matter in fiction
- List of Mass Effect characters
- List of science fiction universes
