= Mass Effect: Universe =

Canceled video game

- A poster revealed on N7 Day 2023.
- Developer: BioWare
- Publisher: Electronic Arts
- Directors: Preston Watamaniuk; Michael Gamble
- Producers: Michael Gamble; Brenon Holmes
- Programmers: Danielle Enns; Romain Toutain
- Artists: Derek Watts; Nicolas "Sparth" Bouvier
- Writers: Mary DeMarle; Dusty Everman; Michael Tucker; Alex Calleros; Catherynne M. Valente; Derek Künsken
- Composers: Austin Wintory; Sam Hulick
- Release: Canceled
- Genre: Action role-playing game
- Mode: Single-player

Mass Effect: Universe (Note: The game's title is sometimes shown as Mass Effect Universe, without a colon.) is a canceled action role-playing game that was under development by BioWare. It was intended to be the fifth major entry in the Mass Effect series, following Mass Effect: Andromeda (2017), with Mass Effect trilogy lead designer Preston Watamaniuk and executive producer Michael Gamble working as game directors. The game was reportedly set 600 years after the original trilogy and featured handcrafted, more open missions.

The game was initially announced on November 7, 2020, though an official trailer was first shown at The Game Awards 2020. Various teases regarding the game's plot and the involvement of some of the series' fictional races were subsequently made on November 7, a date celebrated by BioWare as the official Mass Effect day. The game was set to abandon Electronic Arts (EA)'s in-house engine, Frostbite, in favor of using Epic Games' Unreal Engine. The game was canceled following EA's acquisition by the Saudi Arabia Public Investment Fund as a part of a layoff round which affected 3% of the workers at the company. Development on the game ended due to an agreement to start development on Star Wars: Battlefront 3, which EA considered a safer investment.

Following the cancelation, an internal trailer leaked online and various developers confirmed their involvement in the game. The writing team had taken inspiration from games like Cyberpunk 2077 and Baldur's Gate 3. The game was titled Mass Effect: Universe due to the player's ability to have "different timelines", similar to Zero Time Dilemma. Various musicians were in talks to write music for the game, including Journey and Stray Gods: The Roleplaying Musical composer Austin Wintory and original Mass Effect trilogy composer Sam Hulick.

Mass Effect: Universe's cancelation and the shutdown of BioWare prompted criticism from BioWare co-founder Greg Zeschuk, who stated that something like Mass Effect could not be recreated by "random people and AI". Writers have commented on the game's leaked trailer and development information, with praise going for the content depicted. The game's cancelation caused a fan-led movement in protest of EA's decision, which has received support from various game developers and members of the Canadian parliament.

== Development ==
=== Early announcements and development ===
The development on a fifth entry in the Mass Effect franchise was first revealed during November 7, 2020, a date known as N7 Day that is celebrated by BioWare and the Mass Effect fandom as the official Mass Effect day. Casey Hudson, then general studio manager at BioWare, affirmed the game was being developed by veterans and released several pieces of concept art, within which a spacecraft reportedly known as the Mud Skipper could be found. An announcement trailer for the game was released at The Game Awards 2020, held on December 10. The trailer began with a series of planets, galaxies, and radio messages, including the sound of a Reaper, the main villains of the Mass Effect trilogy. It concluded with a detailed view of trilogy party member Liara T'Soni collecting a piece of armor and the promise "Mass Effect Will Continue".

Most of the announcements regarding the game were made on November 7. In 2021, a piece of concept art depicting a massive crater whose shape resembled that of the fictional robotic Geth species was released. Months later, producer Brenon Holmes confirmed via Twitter that BioWare had abandoned EA's in-house engine Frostbite in favor of using Unreal Engine. Early in 2022, BioWare hired Michael Tucker and Alex Calleros of "Lessons from the Screenplay", a YouTube channel that discusses and analyzes movie and television show scripts. In a statement released on the official BioWare blog on N7 Day 2022, executive producer and project director Michael Gamble affirmed the game was being led by veteran developers, including Mary DeMarle as senior narrative director, Danielle Enns as senior development director, and Parrish Ley as franchise creative director. The involvement of the Geth and Liara T'Soni in the game were further teased on the same day in a short animated trailer.

Early in 2023, GamesBeat reported that the Mass Effect team had joined the Dragon Age team to aid in the development of Dragon Age: Dreadwolf (later renamed to Dragon Age: The Veilguard). On N7 Day 2023, BioWare released a short trailer depicting one of the game's characters, who was wearing a jacket with the series' signature N7 colors and symbolism. In order to access the trailer, the audience had to access a series of "transmissions" with specific names: "Epsilon", "Oculon", and "Post-Nebula"; names that coincided with original development names for the 2007 video game Mass Effect: "The Epsilon Effect", "The Oculon", and "Nebula: Guardians of the Galaxy". Following the release of the teaser, Gamble posted a piece of artwork on the official BioWare Blog which depicted a club scene populated by various species. Among the species were a Geth that appeared to be wearing clothing, and an Angara, one of the fictional species introduced in Mass Effect: Andromeda. In March 2024, Gamble revealed the involvement of Mass Effect trilogy lead designer Preston Watamaniuk as game director and of Dusty Everman as narrative director. In a post released on Twitter following the release of The Veilguard in 2024, the official BioWare account tempered expectations for announcements on November 7, ultimately releasing a cosmetic Mass Effect-themed armor in The Veilguard.

On N7 Day 2025, a piece of concept art depicting a civil war waged by one of the series' fictional races, the Krogan, was revealed. In a post on Twitter, Gamble revealed that the Krogan civil war was to occur after the events of Mass Effect 3. Early in 2026, Gamble shared a job listing for a production director for the next Mass Effect game. In April 2026, Gamble stated that the development team had "not a lot of time for tease" and was "busy" working on the game.

=== Cancelation and leaked internal trailer ===
On October 21, 2026 an anouncement was made on the official BioWare Twitter account announcing the cancelation of development on the game and the shut down of the studio as a part of round of layoffs which affected 3% of the workers at EA. A staff letter was sent out by EA chief operating officer David Tinson and chief studios officer Cam Weber which explained that the company had reviewed its coming projects, resulting in the cancelation of some of them. The cancelation was reported by Bloomberg, which later reported that the decision to cancel the next Mass Effect game was due to a recent agreement to start development on Star Wars: Battlefront 3. EA could only afford to finance the development of one science fiction action game, and Battlefront 3 was considered less risky, even if development had not yet started.

Following the game's cancelation, an internal trailer crafted by a "small team" using "pre-production" assets was leaked on Reddit. The trailer showcases what seems to be the game's protagonist, an ex-military man, walking in a bar and is approached by an Asari, one of Mass Effect's fictional races. The scene is followed by flashbacks of this ex-military man in the battlefield, while he reveals that he had become tired of ending conflicts. The trailer then depicts his new line of work, which consists on stopping those conflicts before they start and "making choices no one else is willing to make". The Asari then reveals that she started conflicts, being interrupted by an older Liara T'Soni who says that they were aware of that. The scene then leads to a fight as the trailer shifts to the title card, revealing the game's name: Mass Effect: Universe. The veracity of the trailer was later confirmed by Bloomberg's Jason Schreier via Bluesky.

The upcoming Amazon TV show adaptation, confirmed by Variety on N7 Day 2024 and revealed not to be an adaptation of the Mass Effect trilogy on the same date in 2025, was not canceled.

=== Post-cancelation revelations ===
==== Writing and direction ====
After the game's cancelation, some of the game's writers made posts on social media regarding the development of the game. Catherynne M. Valente, writer of the Andromeda tie-in novel Mass Effect: Andromeda Annihilation confirmed her involvement and affirmed the Mass Effect team had figured out how to create a follow-up to the trilogy, while noting that she had not participated in the writing of Anthem, Andromeda and Dragon Age: The Veilguard. Similar remarks were made by Derek Künsken, author of the Quantum Universe novels, who confirmed he had been working on the game "on and off for five years". Künsken described the experience of working alongside Valente on designing the game's character and lore as "the most energizing, in-the-zone collaboration" he had had. Cinematic supervisor Tony De Waal revealed the developers had taken inspiration from games like Baldur's Gate 3 and Cyberpunk 2077, describing how the team had been inspired by Larian Studios and CD Projekt Red to "bring Mass Effect to the next level while remaining true to the trilogy".

Technical director Romain Toutain revealed on a stream on Twitch that the game was called Mass Effect: Universe due to the player's ability to plug their "saves together to create parallel universes", allowing the player to have "different timelines", similar to Zero Time Dilemma. Toutain also confirmed that "all the choices made in the first Mass Effect games were taken into account". In a tweet, Michael Gamble revealed that the upcoming TV show adapterion was meant to complement Mass Effect: Universe. Also on Twitter, Nicolas "Sparth" Bouvier, stated that he had replaced Derek Watts as art director in April 2026, following Watts' retirement.

==== Music ====
The leaked internal trailer used the track "Quartz" by French 79. Following the game's official cancelation and the shut down of BioWare, Journey and Stray Gods: The Roleplaying Musical composer Austin Wintory revealed that he had been in talks with EA to compose music for the game. Wintory released 22 minutes of unused musical concept tracks on a YouTube video, recorded with a Los Angeles orchesta in 2025. Kenneth Shepard of Kotaku, who reported on Wintory's work, described the released tracks as "evocative of the orchestral music that was synonymous with the series" but "string-heavy". In creating these demos, Wintory wanted to pay tribute to the composers of the original Mass Effect trilogy Sam Hulick and Jack Wall, treating their compositions as a "starting point" for his own creations.

In early 2026, BioWare had contacted Hulick for work on music for an internal demo, stating that they were "hoping to get some music written that would feel like Mass [Effect]". Hulick commented on ideas he had had for the composition, noting how he had wanted to introduce more songs with lyrics due to the positive reception of the first Mass Effect's end-credits song, describing how he wanted to collaborate with artists like Gunship, NINA, and The Midnight.

== Gameplay and setting ==
Information verified by IGN and reported by YouTuber Dantics, who was part of a group of members of the Mass Effect community that gave BioWare feedback during the development, described the game's missions as "handcrafted" and similar to those in the original trilogy but with "Hitman-style freedom in how you complete them". Non-"sanitized" romance options would also be making a return in the game, while Liara T'Soni would play a role as a "powerful Asari Matriarch". IGN also reported that the game's early build had "every major [alien] race" working in it. The game's protagonist would be a "John Wick/James Bond-type character who had had experimental technology implanted".

The game would have been set 600 years after the events of the Reaper War, a conflict waged in Mass Effect 3. The setting would have been depicted as a "galactic Cold War" between three factions: one composed by the "Council races" (Turians, Asari, and Salarians); another formed by humanity, the Krogan, the Batarians, and others; and a final third one composed by the Geth. The Geth had also constructed a series of megastructures in the galaxy. The information also portrayed a connection between the Milky Way and Andromeda galaxies.

== Reception and cultural impact ==
BioWare co-founder Greg Zeschuk commented on BioWare's closure and the cancelation of Mass Effect: Universe, noting EA's acquisition by the Saudi Arabia Public Investment Fund had been the "final nail in the coffin" for BioWare, stating that something like Mass Effect could not be recreated by "random people and AI". Zeschuk's concerns came amid a new internal push toward AI-usage at EA, resulting in a low point in worker morale.

Writers have commented on Mass Effect: Universe's leaked trailer and reported information on the game's development, with praise going for the content depicted. Scott Duwe, writing for Destructoid, described the content revealed in the leaked trailer as "absolutely amazing", expressing sadness at the thought that the team was weeks away from revealing something on N7 Day 2026. In a later article, Duwe stated that the franchise deserved better than being abandoned by EA. Carlos Morales of IGN criticized how EA had shut down BioWare without allowing players to see what they were creating with Mass Effect: Universe. Morales described Universe as "the perfect game for where we are culturally in 2026", arguing that the game had the potential to "give people hope to [...] persevere through the psycho reality we're currently living", even if it would not have "solved the problems facing today's world".

=== Fan movement ===
A billboard in Times Square showing support for the #SaveMassEffect movement.

Upon learning of the game's cancelation and BioWare's closure, fans rallied under the "#SaveMassEffect" movement and protested the decision, gathering over 300,000 signatures for an online petition. The fans set up a successful fundraiser to obtain funding for a series of billboards in support of the movement in Times Square, outside EA Edmonton, at EA's headquarters, and outside the location of The Game Awards. A fan also graffitied the petition's motto outside EA's Madrid offices.

The movement has been supported by various game developers, voice actors, and former BioWare employees, including Five Nights at Freddy's voice actor Kellen Goff, game designer James Ohlen, Beamdog's co-founder Trent Oster, and the developers behind The Expanse: Osiris Reborn, Owlcat Games. A video showing support for the movement was recorded by composer Sam Hulick and several of the franchise's voice actors: Brandon Keener (Garrus Vakarian), Ash Sroka (Tali'Zorah), Keythe Farley (Thane Krios), Kimberly Brooks (Ashley Williams), Steve Blum (Grunt), Courtenay Taylor (Jack), William Salyers (Mordin Solus), Raphael Sbarge (Kaidan Alenko), Alix Wilton Regan (Samantha Traynor), Mark Meer, and Jennifer Hale (Commander Shepard). Some members of the Canadian New Democratic Party, including its leader Avi Lewis, have supported the campaign, leading to the creation of a successful official petition sponsored by Don Davies for the topic's discussion in the Canadian parliament.

One of the characters featured in the leaked trailer, a male member of the Quarian species, has been the subject of substantial fan reception.
