= Mass Effect: Deception =

2012 novel by William C. Dietz

- Original cover of Mass Effect: Deception
- Author: William C. Dietz
- Language: English
- Series: Mass Effect
- Genre: Science fiction
- Publisher: Del Rey Books
- Publication date: 31 January 2012
- Publication place: United States
- Media type: Print (Paperback)
- Pages: 336
- ISBN: 978-0-345-52073-9
- Preceded by: Mass Effect: Retribution

Mass Effect: Deception is a novel by writer William C. Dietz set in the Mass Effect universe. Published in 2012 by Del Rey Books, it is the fourth novel set in the Mass Effect universe, and continues the story of the previous three novels. Deception is notable for the negative reception from fans of the Mass Effect series, which prompted significant coverage from media outlets. In response to the negative reception, BioWare announced in February 2012 that they intended to revise the novel's content for future editions of Deception. No rewrite has been announced or published ever since.

== Plot ==
Cerberus assassin Kai Leng journeys to the ancient city of Thondu on the batarian homeworld of Khar'shan to retrieve an item in an auction of rare goods and artifacts. The item in question is the design for a DNA-specific bio-weapon tailored to target the Illusive Man, the leader of Cerberus, and which could potentially affect thousands of people distantly related to him. Leng snatches the design and makes his escape.

On the Citadel, David Anderson, Kahlee Sanders, and Nick Donahue prepare to speak to the Citadel Council about Paul Grayson's attack on the Grissom Academy. At the Citadel Tower, Anderson and Sanders inform the Council of the Reapers' involvement, but the Councilors are unconvinced and prefer to argue that Grayson was acting on behalf of Cerberus, even after they are shown Grayson's Reaper-mutated corpse. Anderson and Sanders are told to continue their investigation. After the presentation, they find that Nick has disappeared. They go to The Cube, a gym for biotics, to see if he had gone there early, but no luck. A volus attendant at The Cube directs them to Ocosta Lem and Arrius Sallus, a salarian and a turian that Nick had been seen with on earlier visits. Lem and Sallus's address turns out to be fake, and Anderson and Sanders come to conclusion that Nick is missing.

Kai Leng meets with the Illusive Man on an abandoned mining world in the Crescent Nebula. The Illusive Man orders Leng to steal Paul Grayson's body and begin observing Anderson and Sanders; their recent activities on the Citadel have drawn unwelcome attention to Cerberus.

Elsewhere in the galaxy, the batarian slave ship Glory of Khar'shan attacks the quarian ship Idenna, carrying Gillian Grayson and Hendel Mitra, who are part of the ship's security team. When the batarians disable the Idenna's drives and board it, Gillian and Mitra help defend the ship. With Gillian's help, the quarians gain the upper hand and charge onto the Glory of Khar'shan. One of the ship's freed slaves is Hal McCann, a former Cerberus operative who worked on the space station where Paul Grayson had been experimented on with Reaper technology. McCann keeps this fact to himself, but does tell Gillian that her father had been killed and persuades her that information on who killed her father could be found on the Citadel. Deciding to track down her father's killer, Gillian commandeers the Glory of Khar'shan and brings Mitra and McCann with her.

Anderson and Sanders find a message from Nick at their apartment. Nick explains that he left to join a group known as the Biotic Underground that advocates biotic supremacy over all of the galaxy's races. Anderson uses contacts in C-Sec to dig up info on where Nick had gone. Videos show Nick leaving with Ocosta Lem and Arrius Sallus, members of the Biotic Underground.

== Reception ==
Response to the novel has been very negative, prompting many fans to petition BioWare to disregard the novel as canon. Some fans resorted to crowd-sourced fact-checking and created Google Docs files highlighting scores of continuity errors, and a fan uploaded a video of themselves burning a copy of the novel on the internet. Robert Purchese from Eurogamer commented, "One explanation for the book's shoddy standards is it's not written by Drew Karpyshyn, writer of the previous three Mass Effect novels as well as lead writer of Mass Effect and co-lead writer of Mass Effect 2." On February 3, 2012, Penny Arcade posted a blog entry and webcomic about this issue. That same day, BioWare staff member Chris Priestly posted a message on the official forums with an apology to fans as follows:

The teams at Del Rey and BioWare would like to extend our sincerest apologies to the Mass Effect fans for any errors and oversights made in the recent novel Mass Effect: Deception. We are currently working on a number of changes that will appear in future editions of the novel.

Kirk Hamilton from Kotaku and Purchese both noted that the novel's publishers, and the game's creators vowed to essentially patch the book and fixing those errors in the next print run. Erik Sofge from Popular Mechanics observed that "this wasn't mere fanboy griping, but a serious backfire—shattering continuity, instead of expanding it—" and that "the game-centric take on pulp is a strategic assault with a demand for solid command and control—and the empire pays the price when the details aren't correct."

Tom Dowd highlighted the controversy over Deception's continuity errors when discussing BioWare's difficulty with cross-property continuity in his book Storytelling Across Worlds: Transmedia for Creatives and Producers , noting that it was embarrassing for BioWare as they were positioning themselves in the video game industry as a developer "who is all about storytelling". Dowd noted that fans may quickly lose faith when they perceive that producers of the material are not taking continuity seriously, which implies a lack of respect for the intellectual property. He argued that "Continuity maintenance is mandatory for a transmedia storytelling property, and sometimes requires going to great efforts to ensure".

== See also ==
- List of novels based on video games
