= Suicide Mission =

A suicide mission is a task that will likely result in the deaths of those undertaking it.

Suicide Mission may also refer to:

- Suicide Mission (film), a 1954 film
- Suicide Mission (Mass Effect 2), the final level of the video game Mass Effect 2
