= Garrus =

Character in Mass Effect

- Mass Effect character
- Garrus from Mass Effect 3 (2012)
- First appearance: Mass Effect (2007)
- Voiced by: Brandon Keener

In-universe information
- Full name: Garrus Vakarian
- Alias: Archangel
- Race: Turian
- Home: Palaven

Garrus (full name Garrus Vakarian) is a fictional character in BioWare's Mass Effect franchise who acts as a party member (or "squadmate") in each of the three games in the original trilogy. Garrus is a turian, one of the various alien species in Mass Effect, and is voiced by Brandon Keener.

The character is initially introduced in the first game as an officer for Citadel Security ("C-Sec"), the space station's police force, frustrated by the rules and regulations of his job. By Mass Effect 2, Garrus forms a vigilante group on the crime-ridden Omega, with his team later being wiped out due to betrayal. Mass Effect 3 features him advising the other turians on how to defeat the Reapers. In addition to the Mass Effect game trilogy, Garrus also appears in the third issue of Homeworlds, which tells the story of how Garrus ends up on Omega and elaborates on his backstory.

Garrus' design was altered throughout the series, though his blue-and-black colour scheme and visor were maintained in all his appearances. Developers initially worried that Garrus, along with the rest of the alien squadmates, might not prove emotionally compelling. However, surprised by positive feedback from fans, the developers included Garrus as a romance option in Mass Effect 2. Since his debut in Mass Effect, Garrus has received widespread acclaim. Various merchandise featuring Garrus has been produced, including action figures, a T-shirt, and a bust.

== Concept and design ==
=== Visual design ===
Concept art for Garrus in Mass Effect 2, featuring other suggested designs which show differing levels of damage sustained in his fight with the mercenaries of Omega.

Garrus is a turian, an alien race with avian features, from a society which values discipline and possesses a strong sense of personal and collective honor. Not many pieces of concept art were developed for Garrus' visual design in the first Mass Effect game. His armor was created by taking one of the existing Turian armor concepts created by concept artist Matt Rhodes, and assigning it the colors blue and black. To further differentiate him from other Turians, the art team gave him a visor and visible facial tattoos. These facial patterns went through several iterations before settling on the final aspect of Garrus' face.

Due to Garrus' popularity, his design in Mass Effect 2 mostly kept his visor and the blue-and-black coloring of his armor intact, as it was assumed that those alone were enough to make him recognizable. However, his armor was given further detail, including a set of side-plates and a wide range of materials, such as cloth and weathered metal. In his recruitment mission, Garrus receives significant damage to his face. This injury meant that two different variants of Garrus had to be produced, one with the damage present, and one without it. To help convey the amount of damage his armor would receive, the art team created several pieces of concept art. In designing the facial scar Garrus receives in that quest, an extensive referencing process was made so it did not feel gruesome, but rather "good looking". In an interview, art director Derek Watts compared its final design to "a Hollywood scar". Early renditions of Garrus' facial 3D model included a bandage to cover the injury. Several in-game alternate costumes for the character were developed, such as an undamaged version of his armor with a slight color variation to make it look unique.

The color of his armor in Mass Effect 3 was altered to also contain silver, alongside blue and black, to indicate Garrus' new rank in the Turian military. The art team added further detail on its legs and sides, including a set of buckles meant to hold the side plates together. These changes were meant to reflect Garrus' familiar look, while making him appear more resistant in battle. Similar to Mass Effect 2, the art team created alternate costumes for the character. Among these was a more worn and contemporary military style armor with grenades on its belt.

For the remastered compilation of all three games in the Mass Effect trilogy, Mass Effect Legendary Edition, the developers made several visual changes to make all three games look visually consistent. Slight differences in recurring characters, such as in Garrus, were maintained, as they were meant to show how the characters aged and matured.

=== Narrative design ===
Then senior writer Mac Walters, one of the lead writers for Mass Effect 2 and Mass Effect 3, was in charge of writing Garrus in the first Mass Effect game. Walters designed Garrus to be a malleable character, waiting to be shaped by a strong figure. He found a challenge in writing a character that could both stand out individually and serve as an introduction to the Turian species. For Mass Effect 2, the narrative team was initially unsure which characters from the original game would make a return as squadmates, and what implications they would have in the game's final mission, the Suicide Mission. Garrus, alongside Tali, was selected as one of two returning squadmates, with his writing being once again handled by Walters. Garrus was conceived as a vigilante bounty hunter fighting organized crime in Omega, a crime-ridden space station built in the crust of a metallic asteroid that appears in Mass Effect 2. Early versions of his recruitment mission saw Garrus attempt to track down the final accomplices of Dr. Saleon, the antagonist of his personal quest in the first Mass Effect game. Walters decided to give Garrus a false identity, "Archangel", to deceive players into believing they were recruiting a "cool, renegade character" instead of Garrus. Elements from a discarded character concept, the "Quarian Infiltrator", inspired by Butch Cassidy and the Sundance Kid, were incorporated into Garrus. In Mass Effect 3, Garrus was written by senior writer John Dombrow.

When deciding the romance options for the first Mass Effect game, the development team was unsure whether the alien characters would be "compelling in terms of human emotion". As such, the developers initially pictured Garrus as a non-romanceable character in the first game. The amount of interest shown by players in starting relationship with Garrus ultimately led the team to make Garrus a romance option in the following entries in the franchise. Unlike other characters' romances in Mass Effect 2, which were initially planned to be pansexual or bisexual but were later made heterosexual due to backlash from Fox News, Garrus' romance was always intended to be heterosexual.

American actor Brandon Keener provided Garrus' voice acting in all three games in the Mass Effect trilogy. Keener auditioned for the role. In an interview with the official Mass Effect YouTube channel, Keener stated the voice acting process consisted of 4-hour-long sessions in which he received Garrus' dialogue and some lead-in lines to perform. The voice director would occasionally read some of the lines to help Keener stray in the correct direction, giving Keener the backstory of the dialogue and feedback on his performance. When recording interactions with protagonist Commander Shepard, Keener usually received lines recorded by Jennifer Hale instead of Mark Meer. Keener found having performances from other characters already recorded helpful.

Each squadmate in Mass Effect 2 had music composed for them, with composer David Kates handling Garrus' theme. To do this, Kates was influenced by the retro synthetic soundtracks of Blade Runner and Tron, with Kates' musical language structured in a very similar way to composer Wendy Carlos' in the latter. In composing Garrus' theme, Kates wanted to bring a "human element" into Garrus to show that he was motivated by more than just battle. Kates also wanted to convey Garrus' conflict between his desire for healing and justice in his theme.

== Appearances ==
Garrus is one of the Mass Effect characters to make an appearance in every game in the Mass Effect trilogy. Garrus has been featured in multiple official Mass Effect non-video game media, such as the third issue of the Mass Effect 2 tie-in comic Mass Effect: Homeworlds. Garrus is among the four squadmates included in the Mass Effect: Board Game – Priority Hagalaz, in which he has his own set of abilities. He also makes an appearance in the motion simulator amusement park ride Mass Effect: New Earth.

=== In Mass Effect video games ===
Garrus was originally introduced in the first Mass Effect game, where he is presented as a disenchanted member of the Citadel Security Service (C-Sec), the security force of the game's main space station and megastructure, the Citadel. He first appears when his case to uncover the truth behind the game's primary villain, Saren Arterius, is closed. Determined to reveal Saren's crimes either way, Garrus is found again when he tries to defend a doctor from aggressors. It is then that player character Commander Shepard can recruit him to aid them in their own endeavor to expose Saren. The player may then take part in several conversations with Garrus, through which they learn about Garrus' backstory and can either attempt to restore his faith in the law or have him become further disillusioned with C-Sec. At one point in these conversations, Garrus asks Shepard for help with locating Dr. Saleon, a Salarian organ trafficker.

Garrus returns in Mass Effect 2, regardless of whether he was recruited in the first game. Shepard first arrives on Omega in search of Archangel, a vigilante who has been fighting organized crime on the station. After learning Archangel was being targeted by the major mercenary groups of Omega, Shepard attempts to rescue him, only to discover Archangel was in reality Garrus. During his rescue, Garrus gets shot in the face, leaving him with a visible scar. Garrus then becomes a permanent squadmate aboard the Normandy, the game's main spaceship and hub, where the player can learn Garrus had abandoned C-Sec and started a team dedicated to fighting organized crime on Omega. One of the team's members, Lantar Sidonis, had ultimately betrayed Garrus, leaving the team to be massacred. Garrus' personal mission in the game revolves around his endeavor to seek revenge against Sidonis, with the player ultimately deciding whether Garrus kills or forgives Sidonis. Like every other party member in the game, Garrus can die during the game's final quest, the Suicide Mission. Garrus is available as a romance option for the female version of Commander Shepard.

Provided he survived the events of Mass Effect 2, Garrus reappears in Mass Effect 3. Garrus is first encountered when Shepard heads to the moon of the Turian home world of Palaven looking for the Turian leader. From that point onwards, Garrus becomes a member of Shepard's squad aboard the Normandy. At a certain point in the game, Garrus invites Shepard to a shooting contest at the Citadel. A female Shepard may also pursue a relationship with Garrus, but only if he was already romanced in Mass Effect 2.

== Reception ==
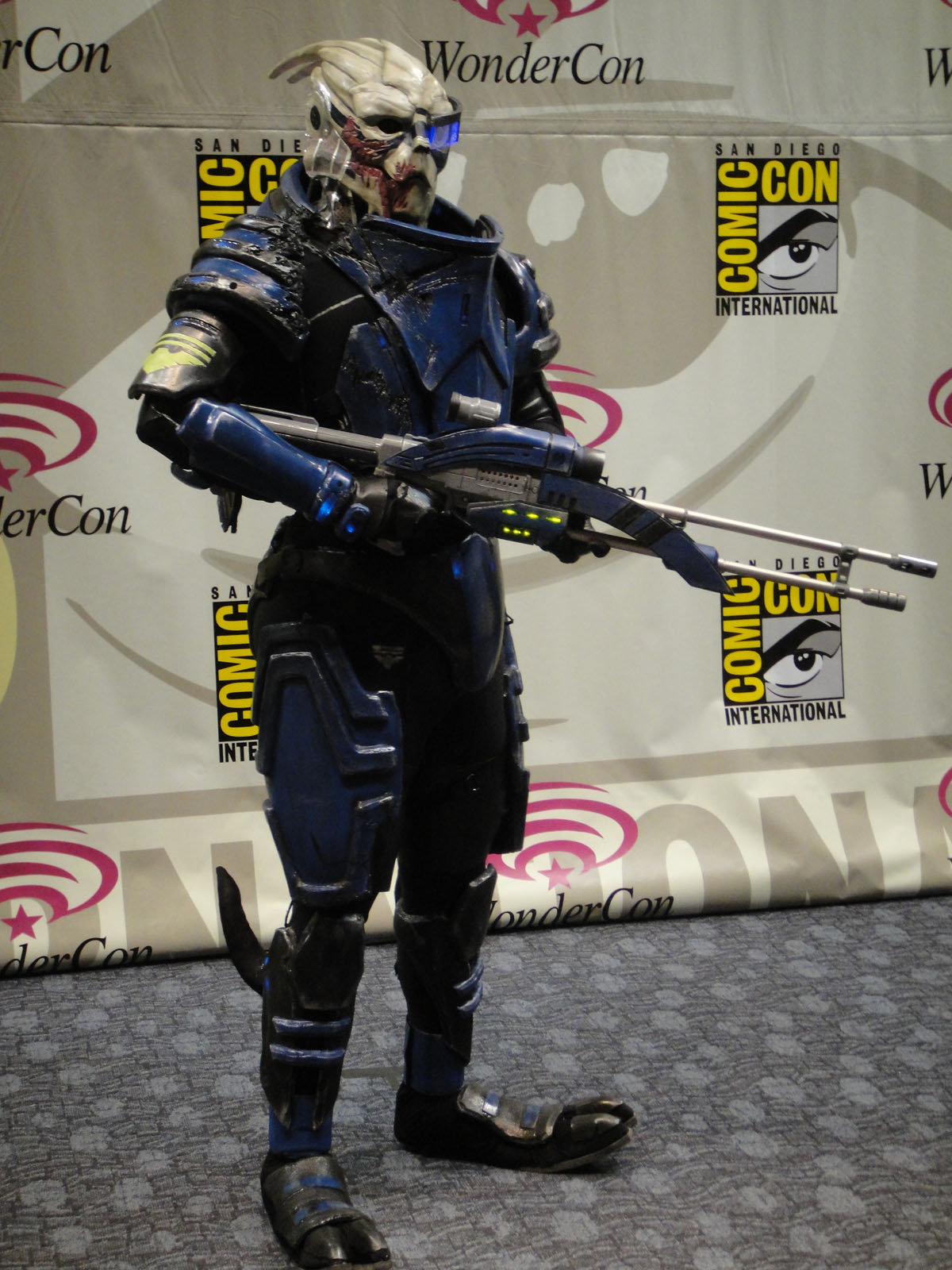
A cosplayer portraying Garrus Vakarian.

Garrus has received near-universal acclaim from both critics and fans. Out of all the squadmates in the Mass Effect series, he has been particularly highlighted as a fan favorite who is consistently placed at the top of several reader's polls and critic rankings. Robert Purchase of Eurogamer observed that Garrus' character arc is firmly defined by his relationship with Shepard, and claimed that he could "write a whole character study on why Garrus is clearly your best buddy throughout the trilogy". Garrus is considered one of the franchise's most recognizable characters. Garrus has been described as one of the best video game characters. Lorenzo Veloria of GamesRadar called him one of his favourite RPG party members. Game Informer's Kimberley Wallace considered him to be one of the best BioWare characters, commenting that "Garrus has enough charisma to top all the rest of the Mass Effect cast." Phil Savage from PC Gamer named Garrus as his personal favorite Bioware companion, commenting that Mass Effect 3 was a game with many endings, and Garrus' ending "takes place before the final battle, shooting cans with Shepard at the top of the Citadel's Presidium. It's a scene laced with humour, rivalry, sadness and, yes, friendship. The best way to remember BioWare's best companion."

According to game statistics for Mass Effect 2, Garrus was one of the most commonly selected characters for the squad. Steven Hopper from IGN selected Garrus as his top teammate in the series. Charlie Barratt of GamesRadar described him as one of several characters that sequels vastly improved, comparing his first appearance as to a comic book character's humble origin story and noting him in his second appearance as a "total unapologetic badass". On the other hand, Jeremy Parish from 1UP.com criticised his personality shift between the first game and the second game, noting that his character suffered the most from Mass Effect 2's "over-edginess", particularly as his darkening was a detriment to the Paragon choice of nudging him towards rules in the first game. Garrus has been called "iconic" and "more than just another squadmate" in US Gamer's retrospective feature commemorating the 10th anniversary of Mass Effect 2.

Game statistics released by BioWare for Mass Effect 3 revealed that Garrus was the second most popular Mass Effect 3 squad member with 23.8% of its player base, after Liara T'Soni. Sal Basile named him the third best squadmate in Mass Effect 3, noting that he made a good counterpart to Shepard. In a 2016 article, PC Gamer ranked Garrus the best companion of the Mass Effect series. PC Gamer staff said "Garrus is something else. He's your best pal, first and foremost, somebody whose objectives and attitude align with your own and who will always, always have your back. The journey from that first meeting between a frustrated C-Sec officer and a novice Spectre during the Saren investigation to that last charge against the Reapers as a pair of war heroes is one of the best friendship stories in gaming."

Garrus' potential romance has generated substantial fan interest. Writing for IGN, Emma Boynes listed the relationship between a female Shepard and him as one of the best in video gaming; and noted that while he seemed an odd choice at first, he "grows on you". In a list of seven game characters who the staff "(seriously) fell in love with", GamesRadar listed him as number 1; Holland Cooper praised his calm voice, loyalty to Shepard, and "pure charisma". A reader's poll ranking the best and worst of Mass Effect games published by PC Gamer in 2015 reveal that Garrus is the sixth most popular love interest, the most popular heterosexual romance option for a female Shepard, and was overall the most popular Mass Effect character. In a 2016 article written for The Guardian, Kate Gray and Holly Nielsen reflected on the Garrus romance scene in Mass Effect 2, and concluded that "the appeal of this scene is in the way he brings wine and puts on music in an attempt to make things nice; it's in his obvious nervousness and the way he eventually lets his guard down."

== Promotion and merchandise ==
As with many of the other squadmates, various merchandise has been made for Garrus. These include two action figures (one of which is designed as a "collectible"), a screenprint poster, a t-shirt, a character key, and a bust. In addition, several fans have made their own items such as plushies and T-shirts; but these are all unofficial. Keener agreed to record a voice mail message as part of a Mass Effect-themed silent auction for Child's Play.

To commemorate the release of Mass Effect Legendary Edition in May 2021, two variant editions of a statue made with polyresin material in the likeness of Garrus were released in mid-2021.
