= Mass Effect: New Earth =

Amusement park ride

Mass Effect: New Earth is a theatrical motion simulator amusement park ride at California's Great America in Santa Clara, California. It is an adaptation of the Mass Effect video game series and features recurring characters from the franchise. New Earth opened on May 18, 2016. On November 6, 2026, Six Flags announced that California’s Great America would be permanently closing on September 6, 2027.

== Ride ==
In the 4½-minute ride, guests sit in the 80-seat Action Theater with a custom 60-foot 3D screen with 4K resolution. The audience's motion seats are equipped to simulate wind and water and are equipped with leg pokers and neck ticklers. The ride features 80-channel surround sound. Guests also wear passive 3D glasses.

In the ride's plot, which coincides with the timeline of Mass Effect 3 during the invasion of the galaxy by the Reapers, a collective of colossal-sized sentient starships, the audience's ride is simulated as a tourist ship which is repurposed from a disused military convoy. The ship is captained by a live action actor who plays Conrad Verner, an obsessed fan of the original Mass Effect trilogy's main character, Commander Shepard. While the ride mentions but does not show Shepard, it featured numerous elements from the Mass Effect universe such as Shepard's companions Garrus Vakarian and Urdnot Wrex, the insectoid rachni race, and vehicles like The Normandy and the M35 Mako. The tourist ship travels through the Charon mass relay and arrives at the colony world of Terra Nova, where it is attacked by a Reaper Destroyer shortly afterwards. Garrus and Wrex coordinate the counterattack against the Reaper in defense of the colony, and direct Verner to take it down using the tourist ship's cannons.

Visitors from past seasons who return to the ride enjoy variations in the experience, because the actors (male and female) who play Conrad Verner work as a team to refine and evolve the script over time, and the ride includes intervals in which the actor can ad-lib or speak freely. The actors are all performers who must audition for the role.

== Construction ==
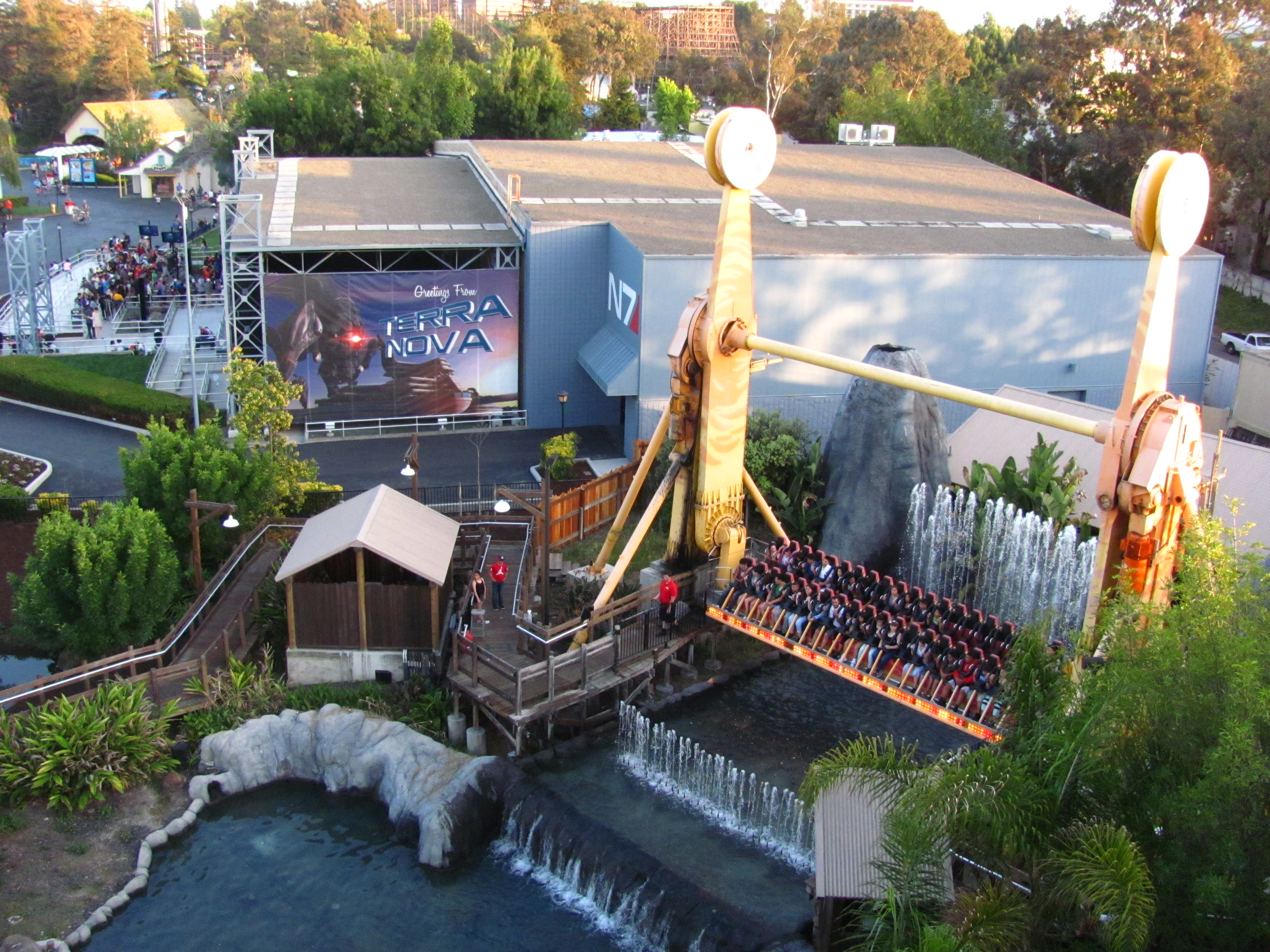
Mass Effect: New Earth at California's Great America in Santa Clara, California.

Electronic Arts, publishers of the Mass Effect franchise, had previously worked with Cedar Fair to produce a ride based on Plants vs. Zombies: Garden Warfare (Plants vs. Zombies Garden Warfare: 3Z Arena) at the Carowinds amusement park in Charlotte, North Carolina. Fortune called the partnership the latest example of amusement park development for contemporary gaming audiences. The Mass Effect ride was announced in September 2015. The Great America amusement park is near Electronic Arts' Redwood Shores headquarters. Mass Effect: New Earth opened on May 18, 2016.

3D Live designed the ride with help from Halon Entertainment and Cedar Fair. BioWare, the series developer, was included on weekly calls to discuss the ride's story, animation, and artwork. The technology used for the ride's screen was originally intended for Michael Jackson's This Is It Tour prior to the artist's death. A representative from 3D Live likened the ride to "a live augmented/virtual reality experience" with the ride's immersive screen, as compared to similar 3D rides at Disney theme parks. Halon Entertainment made the ride's 3D content and borrowed from the series' development assets. The Mass Effect game trilogy was created in the Unreal Engine 3 game engine, and Halon used Unreal Engine 4 for the ride's visuals. Halon's lead technical designer said that the visuals were produced on several artist workstations with Unreal 4 rather than requiring a computer cluster to render the content.
