= Action Theater =

Motion simulator ride

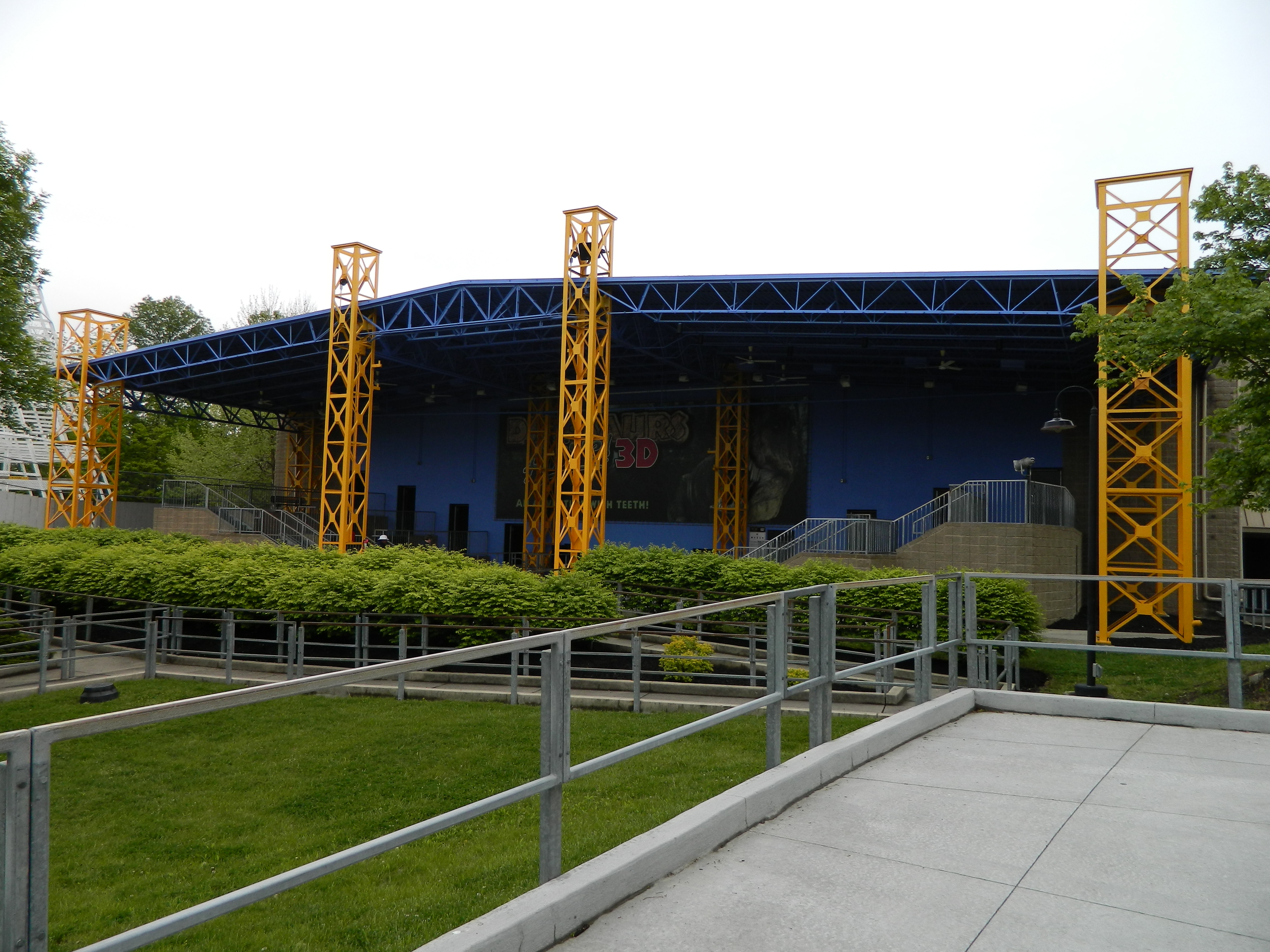
- Action Theater at Kings Island

California's Great America
- Area: All American Corners
- Status: Operating
- Opening date: 1994

Canada's Wonderland
- Area: Frontier Canada
- Status: Closed
- Opening date: 1994
- Closing date: 2019

Carowinds
- Area: Crossroads
- Status: Closed
- Opening date: 1993
- Closing date: 2022

Kings Dominion
- Area: International Street
- Status: Closed
- Opening date: 1993
- Closing date: 2018

Kings Island
- Area: Coney Mall
- Status: Closed
- Opening date: 1994
- Closing date: 2013

Ride statistics
- Attraction type: Motion simulator
- Previously known as: Paramount Action F/X Theater (1998–2008); Days Of Thunder (1994–1997)

The Action Theater is a motion simulator ride that debuted in 1993. Located at California's Great America, and formerly at Canada's Wonderland, Carowinds, Kings Dominion and Kings Island. The attraction was previously known as "Paramount Action F/X Theater" before being renamed following the purchase of the Paramount Parks chain by Cedar Fair in 2006.

== History ==
Action Theater first opened in 1993 at Carowinds and Kings Dominion, operating as a motion simulator themed to the Paramount film Days of Thunder. The following year, the attraction was installed at California's Great America, Canada's Wonderland, and Kings Island.

In 1998, Action Theater was renamed "Paramount Action F/X Theater", and a new James Bond-feature debuted at each location called "James Bond 007: License to Thrill" – a play on the title of an older Bond film called Licence to Kill. Dino Island 3D was shown from 1999 to 2000, Meteor Attack in 2000, and Superstition in 2000 and 2002. In 2001, the theme parks presented The 7th Portal (based on the web comic by Stan Lee) as a three-dimensional ride in which the riders help the Data Raiders fight the Nullifiers.

In 2003, SpongeBob SquarePants 4-D made its debut at all locations. In 2006, The Funtastic World of Hanna-Barbera was presented. It had been closed after its last run in 2002 at Universal Studios Florida.

In 2008, the theater was renamed Action Theater to remove ties to the Paramount branding, and the action movie signage was replaced with a comic book theme.

In 2013, Dinosaurs: Giants of Patagonia was being shown at Carowinds and Kings Island, while "Happy Feet: Mumble's Wild Ride" was being shown at California's Great America. Canada's Wonderland's Action Theater featured Monsters of the Deep 3D, and Kings Dominion's featured "The Lost World 3D". The theaters playing Dinosaur-themed films have had the motion seats removed.

In 2015, California's Great America announced that a 4D holographic attraction themed to BioWare's Mass Effect video game (titled Mass Effect: New Earth) would debut in a newly renovated Action Theater for the 2016 season. Also in 2015, Carowinds announced a similar renovation of their Action Theatre for 2016. The 3D gaming attraction, named Plants vs. Zombies Garden Warfare: 3Z Arena, was based on the Plants vs. Zombies: Garden Warfare video game until its closure in 2022.
