= Batarian =

Fictional species from Mass Effect

- Mass Effect race
- A Batarian Soldier as presented in The Art of the Mass Effect Trilogy: Expanded Edition
- First appearance: Mass Effect: Revelation (2007); Mass Effect: Bring Down the Sky (2008)
- Created by: BioWare

In-universe information
- Home world: Khar'shan

The Batarians are a fictional extraterrestrial humanoid species in the Mass Effect multimedia franchise developed by BioWare and published by Electronic Arts. Originally introduced in the 2007 tie-in novel Mass Effect: Revelation, the Batarians are an anthropoid four-eyed isolationist species that widely practice slavery. Initially, the Batarians were meant to resemble bats and serve as the antagonists of the 2007 video game Mass Effect, ultimately being replaced by the Geth. Batarians were later redesigned and repurposed as the antagonists of the game's first piece of downloadable content (DLC).

Within the game's setting, the Batarians are depicted as an isolationist and aggressive race that lives in a society organized by a strict caste system. The Batarians hold slavery in high regard and treat its abolition as a source of discrimination against their culture. The Batarians are portrayed as having an ongoing conflict with humanity regarding colonization rights of unexplored regions of the Milky Way, and are generally presented as terrorists or pirates. The Batarians made their first video game appearance in the Mass Effect: Bring Down the Sky DLC, and have since then made a return in every Mass Effect game since then, with the exception of Mass Effect: Andromeda, where they are only available as a playable race in its multiplayer mode. Aside from Andromeda, the Batarians are also playable in the multiplayer mode of Mass Effect 3.

Critical reception of the Batarians has been mostly unfavorable, with criticism going for their lesser role when compared to other species in the Mass Effect universe. Writers and scholars have criticized the Batarians for their mostly antagonistic role as terrorists or pirates, drawing comparisons between them and Islamist organizations. Others have negatively received the xenophobic attitudes they both portray and are depicted in.

== Concept and design ==
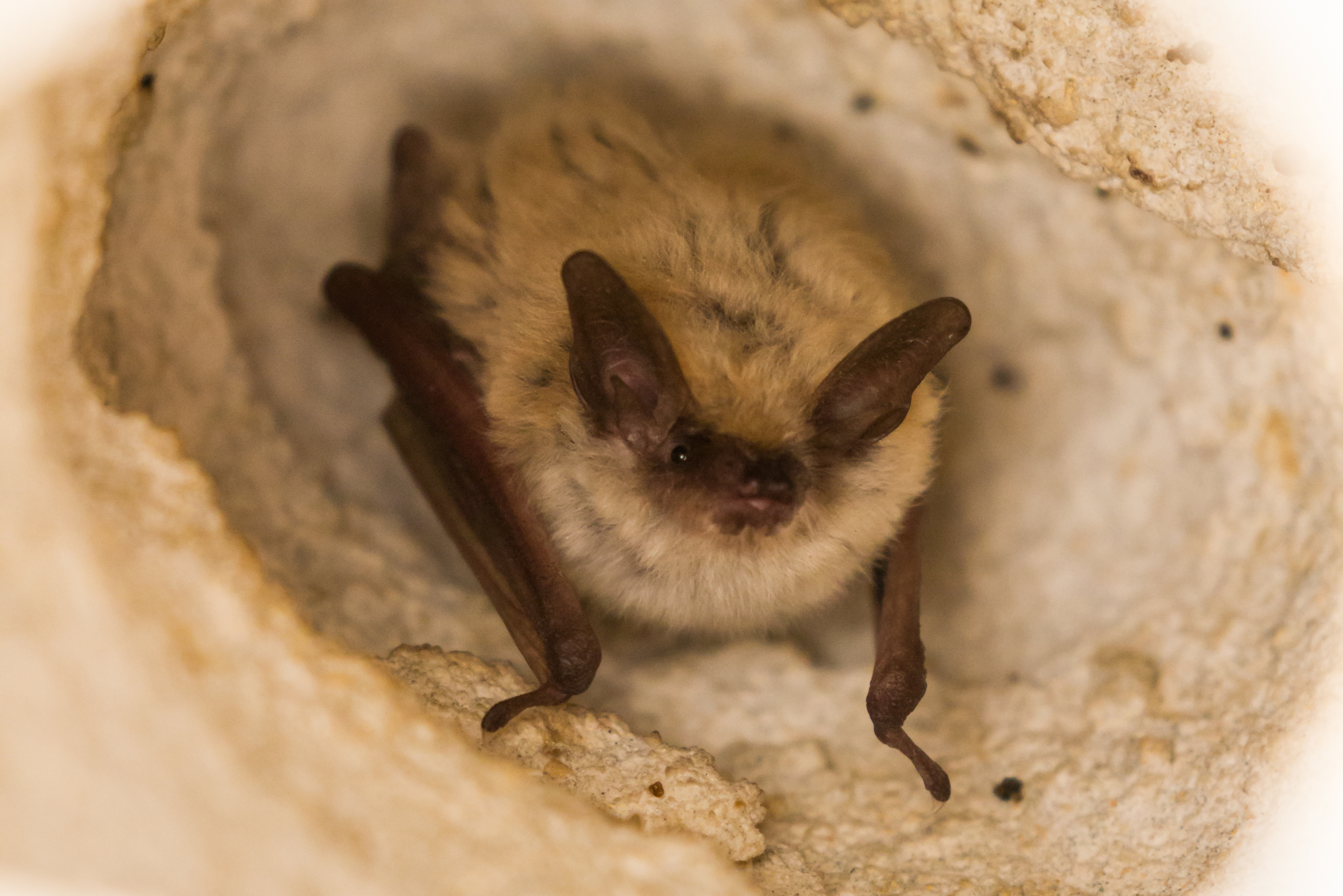
The visual appearance of Batarians was originally meant to resemble bats.

Early scripts of the narrative of the first Mass Effect game saw the game's main antagonist, Saren Arterius, leading an army of Batarians. In this version, the Batarians were depicted as a "warmongering" race of "small bat-like creatures" who alongside Saren were trying to steal the technology of an extinct race known as the "Nazari". As the development progressed, the Batarians were ultimately replaced by the robotic Geth to depict the organic versus machine conflict.

In time, the Batarians were repurposed as a four-eyed humanoid species for the game's first DLC, Bring Down the Sky. When asked about their absence in the base game, then series producer Casey Hudson justified it by stating that the Batarians were meant to be a part of "the rich backstory of Mass Effect", but not necessarily encountered by the player. Hudson commented that the developers had found a way to introduce them in-game as they explored opportunites for DLC. The final visual design of the Batarians was salvaged from a discarded appearance for another alien species. Initially, this design had a set of large fins on both sides of the head. Limitations demanded the Batarians wear human helmets and armor, forcing the art team to squeeze these features to fit inside a human helmet. The creation of a four-eyed species presented a unique challenge for the developers, as it constituted a "new territory in facial construction". The creators of the DLC also had to figure out how facial animations would work on the species. For their appearance in Mass Effect 2: Arrival, BioWare made the decision to force the player to kill 300,000 Batarians to delay the arrival of the Mass Effect trilogy's main villains, the Reapers. This forced mass killing was designed to explain why protagonist Commander Shepard would return to Earth at the beginning of Mass Effect 3.

For the third entry in the Mass Effect series, a version of the Batarians when controlled by the Reapers was created. Known as "the cannibal", it was designed to depict how the Reapers had started their invasion of the Milky Way in the human and Batarian controlled regions. Its appearance features a human corpse as an arm, with the legs of said corpse fusing with a large gun.

The Batarians were to play a role in the canceled fifth entry in the Mass Effect series, Mass Effect Universe. Shortly after the game's cancellation on October 21, 2026, leaked information regarding its plot noted that an alliance between humanity, the Krogan, and the Batarians was to be one of three superpowers in a galactic Cold War.

== Fictional attributes ==
=== Culture and society ===
The Batarians are depicted as an anthropoid species that can be distinguished from other races in the setting by their second set of eyes. Their four-eyed nature is important in their culture, with Batarians portrayed as taking advantage of this characteristic in negotiations, as two-eyed species find it complex to know which pair of eyes to focus on.

The Batarian government is known as the Batarian Hegemony, or the Hegemony of Khar'shan, the Batarian home world. Their society is characterized by its rigid caste system, structured in strict hierarchies. This system is shown to hold racialized differentiations between non-slaves and higher castes, and slaves and lower castes. Slavery also plays an important role in their society, with Batarians treating its abolition as a source of discrimination against their culture. The practice is banned in Citadel Space, the region of the Milky Way under the control of the Citadel Council, a governing authority in the Mass Effect universe. This has led the Batarians to attack several colonies in an attempt to impose slavery on other planets. Their tendency towards slavery has made the Batarians an extremely isolationist species. The Batarians are further depicted as hating humanity due to frequent conflicts with humans regarding the colonization of the Terminus Systems, a lawless region of the Milky Way. Within the setting, the Batarians are generally portrayed as terrorists or pirates.

=== History ===
Before the arrival of humanity into galactic society, the Batarians were already known as an aggressive and expansionist species within the Mass Effect universe. The Batarians are presented as having taken part in various conflicts, including the bombing of the Salarian world of Mannovai and their annexation of the Asari colony of Esan.

Shortly after humanity's arrival, the human government started colonizing planets in the Skyllian Verge, a border region between humanity and the Batarian Hegemony. The Batarians are depicted as being irritated by the human-led expansionist practices in a region that they had considered a part of the Hegemony. The Batarians initially attempted to act diplomatically, protesting to the Citadel Council and attempting to pressure them to declare the Skyllian Verge a "zone of Batarian interest", a proposal that was ultimately rejected. Following the rejection, the Batarians decided to cut all ties with the Council, becoming an isolationist species and opening conflicts against both humanity and the Council. This is the main narrative reason behind the lack of a Batarian embassy aboard the Citadel, a massive space station and neural hub in the Mass Effect trilogy. Tensions between humanity and the Batarians are portrayed as having peaked in a conflict known as the "Skyllian Blitz". The conflict is said to have revolved around a Batarian attack on the human colony of Elysium. The attack was answered by a human assault on the Batarian moon of Torfan that caused the Batarians to flee back into their own systems.

A conflict known as the "Anhur Rebellions" occurred on the world of Anhur, a planet depicted as having a mixed population of Batarians and Humans. Following the passing of a law abolishing slavery on the planet, a civil war is shown to have happened between a Batarian-led pro-slavery faction and a collective of abolitionists.

== Appearances ==
Batarians were first introduced in the tie-in novel Mass Effect: Revelation as a four-eyed isolationist species that practice slavery. Aside from Revelation, the Batarians make various appearances in other Mass Effect media, including the novel Mass Effect: Deception, in which assassin Kai Leng visits the Batarian home world of Khar'shan. In the mobile video game Mass Effect Galaxy, the Batarians attempt to organize a terrorist attack against the Citadel Council.

=== In Mass Effect video games ===
The Batarians made their initial video game appearance in Mass Effect: Bring Down the Sky, the first DLC for the original Mass Effect game. In Bring Down the Sky, a group of Batarian terrorists led by Balak and his second-in-command Charn set an asteroid, which was meant to be used as an orbital base, on a collision course with the human colony of Terra Nova. After either killing Charn or convincing him to stand down, protagonist Commander Shepard confronts Balak. During this confrontation, Shepard must decide between saving the lives of some human scientists being held hostage by Balak, or killing the terrorist leader.

The Batarians return in Mass Effect 2, in which they are a frequent encounter in Omega, a crime-ridden space station built in the crust of a metallic asteroid. Aside from the main game, the Batarians make an appearance in the expansion Mass Effect 2: Arrival, in which Shepard ventures to Batarian space to rescue Dr. Amanda Kenson, who had evidence regarding the Reaper invasion. Nearing the end of the DLC, Shepard is taken to a research facility built on an asteroid and is ultimately forced to make it collide with a Batarian colony to delay the arrival of the Reapers, killing 300,000 Batarians in the process.

Mass Effect 3 is set during the Reaper War, an ongoing galactic invasion being waged by massive, spacefaring sentient machines against the Milky Way races. 20 years before the events of the game, the Batarians had encountered a Reaper corpse known as the Leviathan of Dis. The Batarians decided to study the corpse, unbeknownst to its consequences, and became indoctrinated, a process in which the Reapers slowly influence an individual's mind until they are completely under their control. When the Reapers started their invasion in the Batarian-controlled regions of space, they quickly destroyed their government and forced the survivors to flee. If Balak survived the events of Bring Down the Sky, he is now the last surviving leader of the Batarian Hegemony and is encountered on the Citadel, where refugee camps had been set up. Shepard may either kill him, or convince him him to lend his support against the Reapers. The Batarians are also a playable race in the game's multiplayer mode.

Batarians do not make an appearance in the singleplayer campaign of Mass Effect: Andromeda, but they are a playable species in the game's multiplayer mode.

== Reception and analysis ==
The Batarians have appeared in many best Mass Effect alien species lists, earning a generally unfavorable reception. Sean Murray of TheGamer ranked the Batarians #13, describing them as a race of "pirates, slavers, and criminals", while drawing parallels between their government and North Korea. In her list, Emma Kidwell of Polygon criticized the player's interactions with members of the species, stating that every one of them brought "nothing but feelings of disdain".

Their presentation in the Mass Effect franchise has been the subject of criticism. Writing for TheGamer, Stacey Henley disliked that the Batarians, among other races in the Mass Effect universe, received less coverage than other species, which created a two-tier species hierarchy that undermined Mass Effect's storytelling. Henley also argued that, while Batarians do get notable appearances in DLCs, BioWare's attempts to humanize them fail, because they depict them as "habitat destroying terrorists" and "pirates, slavers and thugs". Elijah Beahm of The Escapist viewed their characterization in the tie-in novel Mass Effect: Deception negatively, pointing out that the novel contradicted previous representations of the Batarian race in the Mass Effect universe.

Critics and scholars have discussed the adversary role played by Batarians as slavers and terrorists. Elijah Beahm objected to the representation of Batarian society in Arrival, noting that the DLC relegated the Batarians to generic villains instead of the more nuanced perspective that Bring Down the Sky had provided. In an article published in PopMatters, Kris Ligman expressed disappointment with Mass Effect's portrayal of Batarians, which reduced them to antagonistic "villains, terrorists, and torturers". Ligman remarked that, even if that level of extremism exists in real life, its depiction in fictional universes should be handled with "a certain obligation to fairness". Ligman also observed that the Batarians resembled "space jihadists" or "space Arabs", comparing the Batarian hijacking of an asteroid in the Bring Down the Sky DLC to the terrorist attack on the World Trade Center. On a similar note, Eamon Reid argued that the Batarians did not go through a "pan-globalist" transition as humanity had, describing "Batarian antics" of slavery and terrorism are shown as a "cartoonish alternative to liberalism", drawing comparisons to radical Islamist groups like ISIS.

Other writers have commented on the xenophobic attitudes presented by the species. Nich Richie, writing for GamesHub, described the Batarians as Mass Effect's most "egregious example of xenophobia". Richie felt the game wanted the player to hate the Batarians, with moments where they were portrayed as "something more" being "brief" and "fleeting". Richie agreed with scholar Vanessa Erat that, in having to kill 300,000 Batarians in Arrival, the game was forcing them to commit genocide. Erat maintained that designing a decision in which Shepard has to wipe out a species to delay the destruction of others sent a "morally problematic message" to players. She contended that the narrative purpose of the Batarians in the series was limited to perpetuating "the fallacy of ethnic usefulness", a process in which player perspective aligns with an "anthropocentric worldview in which species are evaluated based upon their worth for humanity". Eamon Reid made a similar point, comparing their role in the Anhur Rebellions to that of the Confederacy in the American Civil War.

In her PhD, Morgan Enthilope of the Ohio State University used Batarians as the subject of an experiment in prejudice formation and stereotype internalization.
