= Suicide Mission (Mass Effect 2) =

Video game level

The Suicide Mission is the final level in the 2010 video game Mass Effect 2, part of the Mass Effect franchise developed by BioWare. It involves the efforts of Commander Shepard and their crew to enter the Omega-4 Relay and infiltrate the Collector Base, a space station operated by hostile aliens under the command of Harbinger, a member of a fleet of sentient starships known as the Reapers, who has brainwashed their leader, the Collector General. The attack is considered a suicide mission due to the danger posed by the Omega-4 Relay, hence the name. Once inside the base, crew members must be assigned to certain tasks depending on their strengths in order to allow the crew to fight through overwhelming odds, rescue kidnapped humans, and ultimately destroy a "Human Reaper", a tremendous android under construction in the core of the base.

The level received significant critical attention for its high stakes, in which any number of characters, including Shepard themselves, can die due to a lack of preparation or incorrect choices on the part of the player, which are then carried over into the sequel, Mass Effect 3. Due to its branching paths, plot significance and level design, it is considered one of the best video game levels by critics.

== Level content ==
The entirety of Mass Effect 2 functions as preparation for the Suicide Mission to stop the Collectors; Shepard is tasked by the Cerberus organization with recruiting a skilled crew of experts in various disciplines, and mining raw materials to upgrade the Normandy SR-2's systems. "Loyalty missions" improve a squad member's chances of survival during the Suicide Mission by causing them to gain Shepard's trust.

The lead-up to the Suicide Mission starts before crossing the Omega-4 relay, when Shepard recovers a Reaper IFF code while rescuing the character Legion. After the subsequent mission, the Normandy is attacked by the Collectors on account of installing the code into the ship's systems, and they kidnap multiple crewmembers. This begins a timer in which they will gradually die if Shepard does not attack the Collector Base before performing missions; saving all crew only allows enough time for Legion's loyalty mission.

After Shepard enters the Omega-4 Relay, the Normandy is ambushed by Collector ships and drones. Failure to upgrade the Normandy can cause crew members to be killed by damage to the ship. The Normandy proceeds to land on the Collector Base, a space station orbiting a black hole. From there, Shepard's main squad infiltrates the base, potentially being able to rescue members of the crew. Situations emerge where a single squad member must split up to assist Shepard's progress or hold off the Collectors; their loyalty and suitability for the task determines whether they live or perish. When they reach the core, they discover a Human Reaper, and are forced to destroy it. They escape the base, though, if fewer than 2 squadmates remain, Shepard will also perish. Assuming they escape alive, the player can choose whether to obliterate it, or hand it over to the Illusive Man for further study.

== Development ==
The Collector Base in which the Suicide Mission took place was initially planned as being full of lush greenery, and similar in appearance to Ōsanbashi Pier, which inspired art director Derek Watts with its mixture of building and nature. While its structure was made out of sloping, brushed metal, the developers realized the structure would work poorly as cover, and made the level more brutal and stark. While attempting to avoid the cliché of aliens resembling the structures they reside in, they ultimately decided to make the base look more organic to match the Collectors, believing it would be more visually interesting. The developers nevertheless added metal to the floor of the Collector Base in order to integrate mechanical elements into the level design.

Developers stated that, while developing the concept for the Suicide Mission, they knew it was a risk to allow most squadmates besides Shepard to potentially die. It had been their intent to return to characters from Mass Effect 1 in Mass Effect 3 in order to prevent any potential deaths in the Suicide Mission from having undue impact on the story.

== Reception ==
Leana Hafer of PC Gamer characterized the Suicide Mission as one of the great moments in PC gaming, saying that most games did not harness the non-linear storytelling potential of the medium in the same way. Calling the mission "intense" because "anyone can die", she described the level as "brutal", but at the same time indicative of how most games "spoil us with happy endings". She cited the death of Mordin during her own playthrough, made more impactful by having to confront her failure afterwards, and remarking that survival in more games should be based on "meticulous and extraordinary effort". She also mentioned having to know your squad mates to succeed, and the level's "epic music", cinematography, and the "macabre" discovery of the Human Reaper.

In a decade-later retrospective, Tom Philips of Eurogamer called the Suicide Mission "BioWare at the top of its game", citing the debris orbiting the black hole as part of the game's "beautifully-designed final moments". Describing the level as "unparalleled in terms of its labyrinthine choice complexity", he said that the best thing about it was that even if the player prepared for the mission, they would have a "gnawing doubt" that not everyone would make it out alive, and called it "a thrill to see this family you have spent dozens of hours with come together as the Normandy is plunged into danger". He called the lead-up to the Collector Base a "brutal introduction" if the player was underprepared, describing the potential consequences of the mission as "utterly audacious" and "like BioWare making its own version of Empire Strikes Back which kills off Han, Leia and Chewie and still leads into Return of the Jedi".

Andy Kelly of GamesRadar+ stated that "the cruel genius is that BioWare knows full well that you’ve fallen in love with these characters, and then proceeds to shamelessly exploit your emotions", citing the permanent deaths of characters "you know better than your actual friends", while Ali Jones of the same publication called it "one of the best individual missions of the last decade", saying he "wasn't prepared for the dread" of "knowing a single misstep [...] could cost me a companion". Saying he only lost a single supporting cast member, it still came as a "gut punch". Pascal Tekaia of RPGamer described the Suicide Mission as "a memorable event" in "a genre dominated by Revival Tonics and Phoenix Downs", saying that one of his most memorable RPG moments was getting everyone through unscathed on his first attempt without outside assistance.

The release of statistics from the trilogy's Legendary Edition by Electronic Arts showed that players were mostly successful in rescuing all squad members, with Garrus having the highest survival rate (98 percent) and Mordin having the lowest (90 percent). However, Kotaku raised the possibility that players resorted to save scumming when a character died, or followed an online flowchart guide to ensure their survival.
