= Saren Arterius =

Fictional character from Mass Effect

- Mass Effect character
- Saren Arterius, as depicted in the first Mass Effect game
- First appearance: Mass Effect: Revelation (2007)
- First game: Mass Effect (2007)
- Last appearance: Mass Effect: Evolution #4 (2011)
- Voiced by: Fred Tatasciore

In-universe information
- Species: Turian

Saren Arterius is a fictional character in BioWare's Mass Effect franchise. Initially presented in the tie-in novel Mass Effect: Revelation, Saren makes his first and only video game appearance in the 2007 video game Mass Effect, where he is depicted as a Turian member of the Spectres, an elite group of covert operatives with few limitations on their actions. Saren acts as the initial antagonist of Mass Effect, commanding an army composed of members of the fictional robotic Geth species. Saren is voiced by American voice actor Fred Tatasciore.

Early versions of the script for the first Mass Effect had Saren having a conflict with Captain Anderson instead of with Commander Shepard. Initially, Saren's clothing had him wear a set of robes instead of a piece of armor. In time, this armor was modified to include technological augmentations to show how he was starting to be controlled by the Reapers, the Mass Effect trilogy's main villains. His face was designed to maintain some resemblance to other members of his species. For his final boss fight, his design had most of his flesh removed to show his cooperation with robotic lifeforms. Saren's backstory is explored in the comic series Mass Effect: Evolution.

Saren has been received positively, ranking in multiple best villain lists and attracting critical commentary. Other commentators and scholars have discussed his transformation into a servant for the Reapers throughout the game, with his potential suicide scene ranking among Mass Effect's most significant moments. His appearances in other Mass Effect media have also been commended, with critics deliberating on his early radicalization.

== Concept and design ==
Early scripts of the narrative of the first Mass Effect created by lead writer Drew Karpyshyn saw Saren, described as "a villain with a mosquito's stinger coming out of the back of his head", having a conflict with Captain Anderson instead of with Commander Shepard. In this early version, Saren would not lead the robotic Geth, but a race of "small bat-like creatures" known as Batarians with the end goal of stealing alien technology. Saren was present in an early prototype of the first Mass Effect game, made in a development build of Jade Empire. A piece of concept art depicting Saren lifting Shepard by the neck served as inspiration for a similar scene in the final build of the first Mass Effect.

Saren is voiced by American voice actor Fred Tatasciore, while Ginny McSwain served as voice director. Tatasciore described the voice acting process as a "partnership" between the writing team, game director Casey Hudson, McSwain, and himself. Various elements served as a source of inspiration for Tatasciore, including Darth Vader, cats, and iguanas. When asked whether he had portrayed Saren exclusively as a villain, Tatasciore responded that he saw "humanity" behind the character's "sadness and unbroken calculating resolve", which he attempted to perform by maintaining it hidden under Saren's "cold austerity". To depict the character's slow fall into subservience as the game progressed, Tatasciore wanted to show a sense of enthusiasm in Saren while portraying his gradual loss of control.

=== Visual design ===
Following the end of the conception phase of the fictional avian Turian species, Mass Effect's game design team put forward the creation of the game's main villain, which would be a member of said race. This prompted the art team to ponder how different Saren would be from other Turians. Early concepts depicted him as an elderly and physically weak character who possessed the ability to use biotics, a form of telekinesis in the Mass Effect universe. At the beginning, Saren was also conceived carrying a cane or a sword, as it was thought this would allow for "unique acting performance[s]".

Art director Derek Watts and associate art director Matt Rhodes created several concept art pieces for Saren's head, starting from the base head design for the Turian species created by Sum Kim. The art team ultimately decided to keep his head similar to other Turians to allow him to blend in with the rest of his species. For his head structure, Watts was inspired by the anatomy of mosquitos, using it as inspiration for the protrusions that emerge from the back of Saren's eyes. These were created by doubling their length when compared to other Turians. Inspired by a Transformers movie poster, some mechanical parts were added to his jaw, creating some holes through which blue lights could be seen. The art team also made the decision to have Saren not wear any facial tattooing, unlike other members of his species.

Early iterations of Saren's clothing had him wearing a set of robes designed to convey mystery. These concepts were ultimately discarded, as the game design team felt that having Saren wear clothing while all other Mass Effect characters wore armor could make him look weak. As such, the art team ultimately decided to forego this idea, instead opting to have him wear armor. Following a suggestion by director Casey Hudson, his armor was altered to incorporate technological elements to show how he was starting to turn into a machine under the control of the Reapers. These changes included a large Geth arm, blue lights, and a set of tubing covering the back of his head. His armor's design in the cover art of the tie-in novel Mass Effect: Revelation was altered to remove all his robotic enhancements, to show how Saren looked before meeting the Reapers.

Saren's monster form for his final boss fight in the game was inspired by a specific variant of the robotic Geth species, the Hopper, with Saren's form adapted to walk on four legs. It was designed to symbolize his cooperation with robotic lifeforms by burning his organic flesh, removing his jaw, and adding wiring all throughout his body to show the full extent of his technological alterations.

== Appearances ==
Saren Arterius has made an appearance in different Mass Effect related media. Originally introduced in the tie-in novel Mass Effect: Revelation, which follows his attempt to uncover the truth behind an attack at a human research station alongside Captain Anderson. Saren would ultimately be responsible for Anderson's rejection from joining the Spectres, an elite group of covert operatives with few limitations on their actions which Saren was a part of. The comic series Mass Effect: Evolution explores his short-lived alliance with the Illusive Man to stop Saren's mind-controlled brother, Desolas, in the First Contact War, a background conflict between humanity and the Turians.

=== Mass Effect ===
Saren's appearance once Sovereign has taken over control of his corpse

Saren is initially encountered by player character Commander Shepard at the beginning of the first Mass Effect game. Saren, a member of the Spectres, directs an attack by the robotic Geth and a massive space ship on a human colony. Shepard attempts to convince the governing authority of the Citadel, a massive space station and megastructure in the Mass Effect universe, that Saren was behind the attack. Shepard is only able to do so after obtaining a recording that proved Saren had killed fellow Turian Spectre Nihlus Kryik. Shepard is then tasked with stopping Saren and the Geth, following leads towards his location on various planets. Saren shows up again on the surface of the planet Virmire, where he plans to create a massive army of Krogan, one of Mass Effect's alien species. After breaching Saren's defenses, Shepard discovers that Saren's space ship was in reality Sovereign, a member of a species of gigantic space-faring sentient starships known as the Reapers. Sovereign had subjected Saren to indoctrination, a process in which the Reapers slowly influence an individual's mind until they are completely under their control. Saren makes his final appearance during the game's last quest, where Shepard can attempt to convince him that his actions were not his own, but rather Sovereign's. Should Shepard be able to persuade him, Saren commits suicide; otherwise, Shepard is forced to fight him. Once Saren is dealt with, Sovereign directly takes control of Saren's corpse, burning most of his remaining flesh and forcing him to fight Shepard.

== Reception and analysis ==
Saren has become a popular character, with fans attempting to recreate him in other video games and him becoming popular in the modding and fanart communities. Saren's role as a villain has been received positively, ranking in many "Best Villains in Video Games" lists, with emphasis put on his indoctrination and racist attitudes towards other species. Cian Maher of TheGamer regarded Saren as one of Mass Effect's most "nuanced and three-dimensional characters", noting how he foreshadows some of the most important narrative points of the franchise. Maher stated that Saren's lack of affection for innocent lives separated him from other anti-heroes like The Punisher, observing how this made him a "pseudo-villain" even before his indoctrination had begun. Maher commented on Saren's role in the game, regarding his background and his hatred towards humanity as "perfect [...] for Saren's insatiable hunger for power". Staff from The Age's Gameplayer video game website ranked Saren among the top fifty Xbox characters of all time, stating that his ruthlessness and aggression made him similar to villains in other media like Darth Vader and Hannibal Lecter.

Saren's indoctrination process, along with his potential suicide, has also been subject to commentary, with IGN ranking the latter among the franchise's best moments. Jessi Sampson of PCGamesN noted how BioWare used Saren as a "vehicle" to show players the dangers of indoctrination, commending the late-game revelation that Saren was a mere agent of the Reapers and not the main antagonist. Sampson further commented on the technological augmentation process that Saren underwent, observing how, even when Saren had already been turned into a servant of the Reapers, he still believed he was in charge of his own actions. Sampson also praised BioWare's "excellent use of body horror" in depicting Saren's appearance in the game. Christopher Könitz argued that in the first Mass Effect game, Saren underwent a process of dehumanization, represented in both his physical appearance and dialogue interactions, experiencing a loss of free will as the game progressed. Könitz stated that in giving the player an option to convince him to commit suicide near the end of the game, the player is able to give Saren back control of his own person. Könitz compared this dehumanization to the one present in the Mass Effect 2: Overlord downloadable content. Cian Maher discussed how, in his view, Sovereign was unable to completely turn Saren into a husk, a Reaper-controlled zombie in the Mass Effect universe, pointing out how Saren's intelligence made Saren able to recognize his importance to Sovereign and the beginning of his indoctrination.

His appearances in other media have attracted coverage, with critics commenting on the beginning of Saren's indoctrination and radicalization. Andrea Shearon of TheGamer regarded Saren as one of the franchise's "most fascinating villains", praising his role in the last pages of the tie-in novel Mass Effect: Revelation. Shearon stated that it was in this moment that Saren finally found his "raison d'être". In an article written for The Escapist, Elijah Beahm praised his origin story in Mass Effect: Evolution, noting how he was depicted as the "ultimate villain" of his species, capturing his most iconic traits. Beahm further described Saren as one of the few characters truly central to "the Mass Effect mythos". Eamon Reid discussed Saren's role in the Mass Effect transmedia universe through a racial perspective, arguing that his anti-human xenophobic radicalization in Evolution made him "an extreme case" of "Turian-human xenophobia". Reid argued his xenophobia was "illiberal", as he held only racial prejudices towards humans.

Alanya Cole and Dakoda Barker discussed Saren from a "liberal humanist" point of view, stating that he encompassed the archetype of the "shadow" as defined by Christopher Vogler. They argued that Saren was a "tangible individual", someone who served as the face of the antagonist from the player's perspective, stating that this was important to Saren's character because the "greater and more dangerous villain" in the game's narrative, the Reaper Sovereign, was less "tangible". They also argued that this role as the "shadow" remains even when Sovereign's control over him is removed near the end of the game, as Saren's previous actions meant that Sovereign had solely made a "villain [...] more villainous".
