= Citadel (Mass Effect) =

Fictional space station

The Citadel
- Mass Effect location
- The Citadel, as shown on the galaxy map in Mass Effect 2 (2010)
- First appearance: Mass Effect: Revelation (2007)
- Genre: Role-playing video game

In-universe information
- Type: Space station
- Location: Serpent Nebula

The Citadel is a fictional space station and megastructure in the Mass Effect franchise of video games developed by BioWare. An ancient station supposedly constructed by the long-dead Protheans, it serves as a galactic capital, trade hub, political center, and control point for the galaxy's mass relays, the hub of interstellar politics and society in the Milky Way galaxy due to its status as the capital of the Citadel Council, the dominant galactic polity within the Mass Effect universe. The Citadel was praised by critics for its design, lore, and the diversity of its inhabitants enhancing the game world.

== Characteristics ==
In series lore, the Citadel is one of the largest artificial structures in the galaxy, with a population of 13.2 million intelligent beings from across the Milky Way galaxy, and uses centrifugal force to create artificial gravity for its inhabitants. Initially, it was discovered by the asari and the salarians, the earliest post-Prothean races to discover the mass relays - megastructures scattered throughout the galaxy that facilitate FTL travel. Following this, an executive committee known as the Citadel Council was created, with the station functioning as the seat of galactic government. The Council holds great sway in the galaxy, and are recognized as an authority by most of explored space.

The Citadel is capable of transforming from an open space station into an impenetrable shell, with each of the five sides containing a "ward" region about the size of Manhattan, while the middle ring contains a hub area known as the Presidium. The Keepers, an enigmatic non-communicative species of green insectoid creatures, are exclusively found on the Citadel and are constantly preoccupied with the ongoing maintenance of the station and its systems. The Citadel's denizens are instructed never to interfere with their maintenance work within the inner systems of the Citadel.

=== Citadel society ===
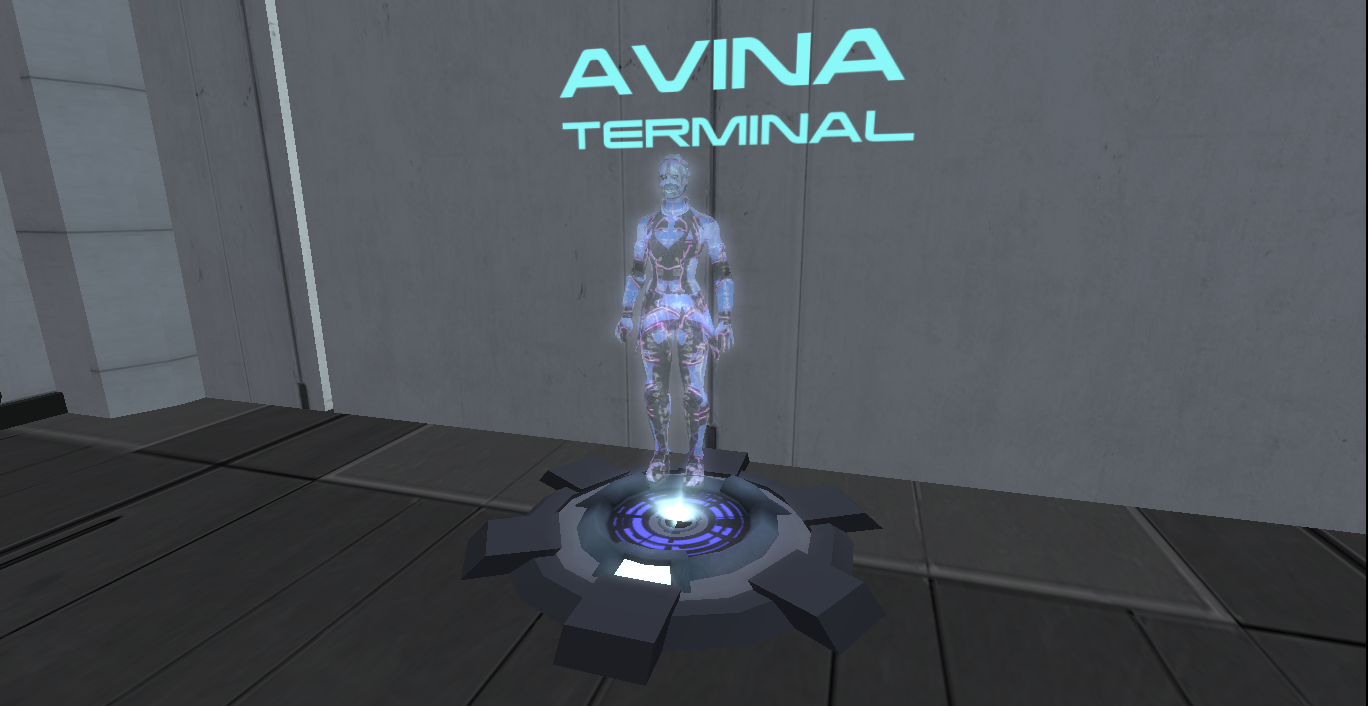
Avina, a non-sentient VI hologram integrated into various Citadel information terminals

Three politically dominant species make up the Citadel Council at the inception of the series: the asari, a feminine species who favor centrism, republicanism, diplomacy, biotic abilities and guerrilla warfare tactics over raw military power; the salarians, an amphibious species who have an aptitude for liberalism, technocracy, technological research, espionage and unconventional warfare; and the turians, a proud avian-like species known for their conservatism, stratocracy, disciplined honour culture and military-industrial capability. Membership of the Citadel Council is eventually expanded to include a human representative by the end of the first Mass Effect. Associate races who have embassies on the Citadel include the volus, a client race of the turians who always wear full-body environmental-suits outside of their homeworld; the hanar and the drell from the ocean world of Kahje, who associate with each other in a long-term, intimate symbiotic relationship called the Compact; and the elcor, a ponderous species resembling a cross between a manatee and a gorilla, who preface everything they say with the intended emotion due to their lack of vocal inflection and discernible facial expressions.

A few alien races are depicted as formerly part of the Citadel space community during the series: the krogan, a hardy and warlike reptilian species in decline in the aftermath of the Krogan Rebellions against Council authority; the batarians, an isolationist people who recalled their embassy staff from the Citadel in protest against the integration of humanity into interstellar society; and the quarians, a race of immunodeficient nomads who were forced to flee their homeworld Rannoch on a migratory fleet of ships when their development of advanced networked synthetic intelligence created the sapient geth, who warred with their creators. Due to this, Citadel jurisdictions place strict limitations on their reliance of artificial intelligence by using "virtual intelligence" (VI) that lack self-awareness, and the quarian Migrant Fleet is shunned in most of Citadel space.

== Development ==
According to project director Casey Hudson, the Citadel space station is the ideal setting for expanded universe projects in other medias because it serves as the cultural, financial, media, and entertainment capital of the Milky Way galactic community. Describing its concept as an expansive and highly livable setting, Hudson made an analogy to the New York City borough of Manhattan as a place populated with numerous cultures and where "thousands of stories" could be told. As the Citadel represents the seat of power for the Council, the developers determined that it is the level most representative of Mass Effect's architectural style and should aim to define the look of the series.

The Citadel's appearance was influenced by the art of Syd Mead, such as his design for NASA concepts like the Stanford torus. The outline of the Citadel's shape, based on a sculpture that had five sides and a ring, consists of large swooping curves cutting across vertical lines.

== Plot ==
While most beings in the series initially believe that the Citadel is a Prothean space station that was abandoned for unknown reasons, Mass Effect reveals that the Citadel was in fact constructed by the Reapers, an ancient race of machine lifeforms that periodically cull the intelligent species of the galaxy. The mass relays are intended to guide species which have attained spaceflight technology to the Citadel, itself a tremendous relay that allows the full force of the Reapers to invade the galaxy. It was made to be habitable as a trap to encourage it to be used as the seat of galactic government, allowing it to be quickly wiped out by the Reapers. However, species wiped out by the Reapers previously recognized the Citadel as a potential weakness of the Reapers, and created plans for a device, the Crucible, to co-opt it as a countermeasure against them. In Mass Effect 3, the races of the Milky Way galaxy collaborate to construct and deploy the Crucible, using it to either destroy, gain control of, or merge with the Reapers, though the Citadel is heavily damaged, and possibly destroyed in the process.

== Reception ==
Alex Meehan of GamesRadar+ called the Citadel "a realistic way of bringing all the different elements of Mass Effect's world under one roof", saying it was "chock-full of interesting people and exciting encounters". Commenting that the station's reveal is "unapologetically indulgent", she states the scene "completely epitomizes all the ambition and wonder behind the first Mass Effect". Contrasting the Citadel with other games' "vast and impressive locations with nothing to do in them", she stated that the Citadel feels like "a real place inhabited by real people", but criticized the Citadel in Mass Effect 2 and 3 for lacking as much immersion as its first incarnation.

Ari Notis of Kotaku remarked that the Citadel was beautiful, comparing the interior of the station to a landscape from a "well-crafted JRPG", and stating that it inspires travel envy. In particular, he noted the Presidium's signature color scheme of "Aegean blues and Caribbean greens".

While the Citadel is notable for how it brings together most of the intelligent alien races in the galaxy, astronomer Seth Shostak has criticized it for encouraging an unrealistic concept of how humans and aliens could co-exist, arguing that in reality, there would be far too many physical and mental obstacles for such divergent species to share the same living space. The fact that all alien races are younger than 50,000 years old due to the Reapers' past actions is noted as what allows the aliens on the Citadel to commiserate in such a way.
