= Turian =

Fictional species in the Mass Effect series

- Mass Effect race
- A typical male turian soldier as he appears in Mass Effect 3's multiplayer mode
- First appearance: Mass Effect: Revelation (2007)
- Created by: BioWare

In-universe information
- Quadrant: Citadel Space
- Home world: Palaven
- Affiliation: Citadel
- Leader: Primarchs; Turian Hierarchy
- Notable members: Garrus Vakarian; Saren Arterius; Nyreen Kandros; Vetra Nyx

The Turians (/ˈtʊəriənz/ TOOR-ee-ans) are a fictional extraterrestrial humanoid species in the Mass Effect multimedia franchise developed by BioWare and published by Electronic Arts. Turians are the first alien species to have come into contact with humanity within series lore, which inadvertently sparked a brief but vicious period of conflict which is eventually de-escalated due to the intervention of the Citadel Council, a multispecies supranational intragalactic governing body based on the Citadel space station. The aftermath of the so-called First Contact War as well as the underlying tensions between humanity and the turians form a recurring narrative theme in the Mass Effect series, which began with the franchise's debut work, the 2007 novel Mass Effect: Revelation. Turians are conceived as an avian humanoid species with an exoskeleton, whose biology is radically different from that of humanity and several other species, and are culturally rooted in a stratocratic society. Turian characters have appeared in most Mass Effect games and media with several playing major storyline roles, such as Garrus Vakarian, Saren Arterius, Nyreen Kandros, Vetra Nyx and Tiran Kandros. In addition, the turians are playable characters in the multiplayer modes for Mass Effect 3 and Mass Effect: Andromeda.

The turians have been recognized as an important and recognizable aspect in the Mass Effect narrative, and turian characters are popular among series fans as subjects for expressions of fan works. The relatively late introduction of female turian characters into the main series games has been met with some criticism, as well as commentary on the influence of traditional gender constructs in fiction writing and on gender representation in video games.

== Concept and design ==
The turians originated as a vague idea for a birdlike, proud militaristic race by BioWare's writing department for Mass Effect, which the design team aimed to reflect in their features. The Bioware team was influenced by the space game Star Control II, with the Turians taking inspiration from an avian warrior race called the Yehat. Multiple character sketches which have little similarity with each other were conceived and later discarded before the team settled on artist Brian Sum's concept for the final look of the species: the horns on the back of the head resemble feathers of a bald eagle in shape, the mouth part resembles a bird's beak, and the legs are dog-like in shape. The artists originally sketched turians without any clothing in order to explore their alien anatomy, but faced limitations in designing the species' bone structure as all squadmates shared a humanoid skeleton for combat animation purposes. The team realized that the knees had to line up with the body's ankles and the waists, and that the original concept's long arms and wide waists had to be shortened in order to conform to a human-like bone structure. Their final design is broadly humanoid with two legs, two arms, and a head, and their voices have a flanging quality.

"We usually try to avoid the females because what do you do with a female turian? Do you give her breasts? What do you do? Do you put lipstick on her?"

— Derek Watts, Mass Effect 3 art director

According to Mass Effect 3 art director Derek Watts, all of the turian head models prior to the release of the Mass Effect 3: Omega downloadable content pack are almost the same with the exception of certain characters, and are male by gender. To differentiate between individual turian characters, tattoos or warpaint of different patterns and colors are employed to decorate each individual's face. They were designed to have head crests which resemble that of a plumed bird, avian legs with bones jutting from their calves, and a metal-laced carapace on their shoulder blades. In designing turian clothing, the art team wanted to create something that achieved a balance between human and alien in order to allow space for the aforementioned physical features.

The first female member of the turian species to appear in the main series video games was Nyreen Kandros, introduced in the Omega downloadable content pack for Mass Effect 3. Nyreen was originally conceived as an asari with no relation to Aria T'Loak, before writer Ann Lemay expanded the role and changed the character's species as part of her effort to create a more diverse female character. BioWare Montreal producer Fabrice Condominas said that designing Nyreen was challenging because the team had no prior video game reference point for a female turian and wanted the character's gender to be recognizable on first impression. The Art of the Mass Effect Trilogy: Expanded Edition presents Nyreen's concept art as an attempt to adjust turian bone structure to appear more feminine, with concepts giving her a slimmer head, an adjusted jawline, and omitting the longer cranial crest common to male turians.

Except for members of the asari race like Liara T'Soni, no other alien characters are available as romance options for the first Mass Effect. Then-project director Casey Hudson noted that the developmental team was initially unsure if they could rely on the alien characters on an emotional level in terms of storytelling, though he felt that by the time the team had finished the first game, they turn out to be some of its most emotionally engaging characters. He also noted that there was much desire for protagonist Commander Shepard and Garrus to be in a potential romantic relationship, in spite of the latter's turian physiology which has little in common with a human's, which greatly increased in popularity after Garrus becomes a romance option in Mass Effect 2.

== Attributes ==
=== Biology ===
Nyreen Kandros (left), introduced in Mass Effect 3: Omega, visually contrasts BioWare's first in-game female turian design with the broader, crested male turian design on the right. Her appearance emphasizes a slimmer head, adjusted jawline, and shorter crest structure.

Turians are depicted to be an avian species whose physiology is directly influenced by the environment of their home world, Palaven. Turians are portrayed to have a carapace-like exoskeleton that acts as protection from Palaven's high levels of solar radiation, though it does not protect them against physical impact. The turians exhibit characteristics of sexual dimorphism: while all individuals have mandible-like facial features flanking their mouths, female turians are presented as lacking the sweptback cranial crests associated with male turians that project a raptor-like silhouette. Instead, turian females possess somewhat elaborate cheek extensions, and a body shape which is considerably more graceful and slender.

Turian biochemistry is depicted to be based on D-amino acids, which sets them apart from most other species in the setting, which are based on regular L-amino acids. As such, turians cannot eat human food, or ingest any substance that is based on L-amino acids. This results in turian individuals who engage in sexual relationships with individuals of other species to be at risk of suffering adverse reactions in case of a substance exchange between either party, including a severe anaphylactic shock, which is depicted to be fatal if untreated.

=== Culture and society ===
Turian culture was modeled after the ancient Roman civilization, and is depicted to be fundamentally egalitarian with no apparent definition of specific caste or gender roles. The turian government functions as a military meritocracy, in which corruption is avoided due to the turians' predisposition towards personal reponsability, devotion for public good and honesty. If a turian individual is ascended through corrupt means, shame is laid on the person who promoted them instead of on the underperforming individual. Their society is shown to be ruled by a set of powerful individuals known as Primarchs, who vote on matters of national importance and govern separate star clusters. The turian economy is portrayed as larger than that of the humans but inferior to the asari, another Mass Effect species, with the role of business development primarily handled by a client race known as the volus.

Spread throughout the galaxy and living according to a martial code of conduct, the turians are represented to be commonly perceived by other species to be disciplined, forthright and rule-abiding in terms of personality. Many turians are shown to bear distinctive facial markings or tattoos unique to their home colony, depicted to be both a badge of honor and a cultural relic from a bygone era in which the turian species was embroiled in civil war. The turian fleet is portrayed as the largest in Citadel Space, and their armed forces make up the single largest portion of the council's military force. The umbrella of this military force is depicted to cover areas that are not strictly military, such as police, firefighting or colony architecture. Due to their role at the center of the Citadel's military, they often serve as law enforcement on behalf of the asari and salarians, and the starships used by other species within Council space are often based on turian designs. However, despite this tendency towards militarism, the turians are portrayed as a progressive species.

=== History ===
Within the series' lore, the turian government, known as the Turian Hierarchy, plays a pivotal role in major interstellar conflicts. For example, the background historical conflict of the Krogan Rebellions was quelled when the turians deployed a devastating biological weapon developed by the salarians known as the Krogan Genophage, which impairs the reproductive viability of the krogan on a genetic level by causing almost all newborn krogan to be stillborn. As reward for their service, the turians are depicted to be the first species to be invited to join the Citadel Council, following its creation by the asari and the salarians, to fill a peacekeeper role.

Another background conflict, the First Contact War, which the turians refer to as the "Relay 314 Incident", serves as the background history for humanity in the Mass Effect universe. The conflict broke out when turian forces attempted to stop human explorers from opening a new "mass relay", a set of massive highly advanced devices that enable rapid space travel in the Mass Effect universe, by force in order to prevent a repeat of the Rachni Wars, a historical conflict that had started when explorers accidentally unleashed a dangerous species of hostile insectoid creatures from an unexplored region of space. Although hostilities between the human Systems Alliance and the Turian Hierarchy ceased following the three-month war and humanity was integrated into the galactic community soon after, the relationship between turians and humans is shown to garner a deep level of mutual resentment over casualties from both sides as a result of the conflict. This brief historical background, as presented in the game's introduction, offers insight into the ideological setup of the Mass Effect universe.

== Appearances ==
Turian characters are featured prominently in Mass Effect media, either as leading or supporting characters. One of the main characters of Mass Effect: Revelation, the franchise's inaugural media installment, is Saren Arterius. He is a turian member of the Spectres, a special forces unit which answers directly to the Citadel Council, who resents humanity as a result of the First Contact War's events and actively works to undermine the candidacy of human Spectre hopeful David Anderson. The turian representative of the Citadel Council also appears in Revelation, with the Council being presented as the governing body and ultimate authority in Citadel space. By the novel's ending, Saren discovers a massive starship of unknown origin, which sets into motion the events of the first Mass Effect game which occurs 18 years after Revelation.

=== Mass Effect ===
The introduction of Mass Effect begins with player character Commander Shepard on board a spacecraft known as the SSV Normandy, which is created from a joint collaboration between humans and turians. In their effort to join the Spectres, Shepard has to work under the supervision of turian Spectre Nihlus Kryik to investigate an ongoing attack by the geth, a synthetic race of artificial intelligences that rebelled against their creators, on the human colony of Eden Prime. On the surface of the planet, Shepard encounters Saren Arterius, who murders Nihlus. Saren Arterius then serves as the game's main antagonist, commanding the geth on behalf of the Reapers, a collective of sentient hyper-advanced starships, to attack several colonies and facilities. The now-Spectre Commander Shepard is then tasked with hunting Saren down. Towards the end of the game, Saren and the Reaper Sovereign lead an army of geth to attack the Citadel, but are ultimately defeated. The game also introduces the franchise's inaugural turian party member or "squadmate", Garrus Vakarian, a turian officer that was a member of the Citadel's security service and gives the player an insight into the turian species.

=== Mass Effect 2 ===
Mass Effect 2 sees the return of turian squadmate Garrus Vakarian, who had been living under the false identity of Archangel, a bounty hunter on Omega, a crime-ridden space station built in the crust of a metallic asteroid. During his loyalty mission, a specialized side-quest that the player has to complete in order to gain each squadmate's loyalty, Shepard has to locate and attempt to assassinate Sidonis, a turian former member of Garrus' team on Omega that had ultimately betrayed him.

=== Mass Effect 3 ===
By the events of Mass Effect 3, the Reapers had launched a galaxy-wide invasion against the various civilizations of the Milky Way. Shepard is tasked by the turian councilor with rescuing Primarch Fedorian from a military base in Menae, a moon orbiting Palaven, but discovers upon arrival that he has died along with the majority of the Hierarchy's leadership during the Reapers' initial assault. In spite of monumental losses, the turians manage to hold out and Palaven does not fall to the Reapers unlike the homeworlds of several other species. Fedorian's successor and the highest ranking turian official left alive, Adrien Victus, is secured by Shepard, and he pledges turian support to the Alliance's efforts to retake Earth once Shepard successfully convinces the krogan to reinforce Palaven's defenses.

The story arc also explores the turians' role in the original deployment of the Krogan Genophage as well as an operation led by the primarch's son Tarquin Victus to disarm a bomb, planted in the aftermath of the Krogan Rebellion as a last resort weapon in the event that a resurgent krogan civilization renew their aggression within Citadel space. Mutated turians like the Marauder, "generals" among the Reapers' ground forces of synthetic-organic "husks", and the hybrid Brute spliced from a mixture of krogan and turian body parts, are introduced as new enemy types.

The third game's Omega expansion pack introduced Nyreen Kandros, although minor female turian characters have appeared in other media prior to the release of Omega in November 2012.

=== Mass Effect: Andromeda ===
In Mass Effect: Andromeda, a contingent of turian colonists participates in the Andromeda Initiative, a civilian project which sends settlers on board "ark ships" on a one-way trip to the Andromeda Galaxy prior to the events of Mass Effect 3. Similar to the asari and salarian arks, the turian ark never managed to reach the Nexus, an enormous space station that had also been sent on its way to Andromeda. On the planet Havarl, player character Pathfinder Ryder encounters turian Avitus Rix, a survivor from the ark that is in pursuit of the ark's location. Once the planet Eladaan has been reached, Ryder may pursue a side-quest alongside Rix that ultimately culminates in them locating the missing ark and Rix becoming the new turian Pathfinder.

The game also introduces female turian Vetra Nyx as a squadmate of Ryder aboard the Andromeda Initiative Survey Ship Tempest. Another major turian character in Andromeda is Tiran Kandros, who is the leader of a de facto volunteer militia on the Nexus. Tiran's backstory is explored in the limited comic series Mass Effect: Discovery.

=== In other media ===
The turians are featured as a themed skin for Anthem player characters, released on November 7, 2019, in commemoration of "N7 Day", an informal celebration of the Mass Effect franchise observed annually.

== Reception and analysis ==
=== Critical reception ===
Several turian characters, most notably Garrus, have received a positive reception from players and video game journalists, and are embraced as a popular choice for fan art as well as cosplay at gaming and science fiction conventions since the franchise's inception. Saren has received some acclaim as a notable video game antagonist: he placed #29 on IGN's list of top 100 video game villains, and #92 on GamesRadar's list of 100 best villains in video games published in 2013. PC Gamer staff ranked Vetra as the second best squadmate of Andromeda, with praise for her nuanced and relatable characterization.

The lack of female turian characters for the majority of the first three main series games attracted criticism. Zekany noted from her research that Watts’ remarks from an interview with Game Informer prompted backlash among players who "used the incident as an opportunity to criticize the industry's general unwillingness to invent in diverse nonmale character designs", while others chose to ignore his comments as part of their personal interpretation of the Mass Effect universe. Zekany herself was perplexed by the exclusion of female turian characters throughout most of the original trilogy, as turian society "does not uphold any rigid gender hierarchies". Polo, writing for The Mary Sue, called out Watt's comments as "lazy" and found it incredulous that female turians are only introduced after female krogan when contrasting the different circumstances between their respective societies. Mumu Lin from the Daily Californian said BioWare's decision, which she opined is based on "societally ordained concepts" of gender, almost gave the impression that the turians are a mono-gendered species in the same manner as the asari. Lin argued that this is a result of the writers' anthropocentric view when coming up with a “diverse” world, and that unlike the krogan, there is no excuse for female members of a thriving species like the turians to be excluded from being encountered by the player character in an entire galaxy across three games.

The introduction of Nyreen in the Omega DLC has received varied commentary. Some praised her characterization and welcomed the decision as female representation was important for the game; others were disappointed that her visual design consisted of features that mostly relied on conventional depictions of femininity as interpreted through the lens of a human understanding of gender, with some even preferring a lack of divergent gender markers in turian characters. Lin was of the view that the inclusion of a major female turian character was an attempt by BioWare to address criticism of their limited view of possibilities in alien races which are influenced by heteronormative or traditional gender constructs.

=== Analysis ===
GameSpot uploaded a video in April 2012 which analyzed the plausibility of life in other parts of the universe, and if complex extraterrestrial life exists, the probability of convergent evolution which the Mass Effect series has adopted for the conception of most of its alien races. Presenter Cameron Robinson noted that most of the Mass Effect races physically resemble terrestrial animals in terms of appearance and compared the turians to crabs.

In an article published by the Bulletin of Science, Technology & Society in 2016, Eva Zekany from Central European University explored the boundaries of interspecies sex and the desire for alien romance options as depicted in the Mass Effect series, as well as their reinterpretation by Mass Effect fandom. She observed that the presentation of a human-turian romantic relationship as well as its complexities invite "interesting questions about either the potential exacerbation, or the rendering-unintelligible of sexual difference, as well as about cross-species desire and about the ontology of the natural and the artificial". Zekany drew attention to fan art which offers a "careful and detailed study" of possible turian anatomy and "the ways in which it might misfit with human anatomy". She suggested that these anatomically detailed sketches represent a type of desire that is attached to biological difference, but not sexual difference or its associated hierarchical meanings. Zekany also discussed the representation of posthumanism in Mass Effect and how it emerges through an affective connection between species which are biologically and culturally incompatible with each other by convention, giving rise to the concept of nomadic subjectivity that "transcends the artifices of gender and species definitions".

== Cultural references ==
American electronic musician Baths wrote and composed a song called "Turian Courtship", which is included in a B-Side compilation released in 2011.

An internet meme called "Marauder Shields" originated from negative player reception towards a portion of the controversial ending sequence of Mass Effect 3. It sarcastically references the fact that the final enemy unit the player fights in the game is a standard Marauder protected by defense shields, who is nevertheless easily dispatched by the player as Shepard. The meme's notoriety inspired a parody webcomic about the character.

An advanced persistent threat (APT) group which targets various states' Ministries of Foreign Affairs as well as telecommunication companies in Africa and the Middle East utilizes backdoor method as part of its modus operandi; a custom backdoor which emerged in the late 2010s is dubbed "Turian" and noted for its similarities to "Quarian", another backdoor deployed against Syrian and American diplomatic targets in the early 2010s.
