= Liara T'Soni =

Secondary character of the Mass Effect franchise

- Mass Effect character
- Liara as she appears in Mass Effect 3 (2012)
- First appearance: Mass Effect (2007)
- Created by: Casey Hudson; Drew Karpyshyn
- Voiced by: Ali Hillis (video games); Jamie Marchi (Mass Effect: Paragon Lost)

In-universe information
- Race: Asari
- Origin: Thessia
- Class: Scientist
- Skill: Biotics

Dr. Liara T'Soni is a fictional character in BioWare's Mass Effect franchise, who serves as a party member (or "squadmate") in the original Mass Effect trilogy. She is an asari, a female-appearing species from the planet Thessia who are naturally inclined towards biotics, the ability to "manipulate dark energy and create mass effect fields through the use of electrical impulses from the brain". Within the series, Liara is noted for being the galactic scientific community's foremost expert in the field of Prothean archaeology and technology, specifically evidence concerning the demise of the ancient Protheans, believed by the galactic community to be the pre-eminent civilization in the Milky Way galaxy until their sudden disappearance fifty thousands years before the events of the first Mass Effect.

Liara is voiced by Ali Hillis in the video games. Outside of the trilogy, Liara appears as the protagonist in the Mass Effect: Redemption series, and the fourth issue of Mass Effect: Homeworlds, a comic series with individual issues on each of several Mass Effect 3 squad mates prior to the Reaper invasion. Liara also has cameo appearances in Mass Effect: Andromeda, and in the animated feature film, Mass Effect: Paragon Lost, where she is voiced by Jamie Marchi.

Liara has been received positively, with placements on several "top character" critic and fan lists. Various merchandise for the character, as with other of the series' squadmates, has been released. The character was the subject of some controversy in 2007 following the release of the original Mass Effect, with at least one case of government scrutiny over a potentially intimate in-game cutscene between Liara and a female Shepard.

== Character overview ==
Liara is an asari; a species of galactic hyperpower dominance within the Citadel Council, unanimously considered the most advanced organic race in the Milky Way galaxy, whose members can live for over a millennium; and a species which is perceived to have a feminine appearance by non-asari standards, and which is sometimes described as "all female". Most asari choose to use feminine third-person, singular personal pronouns as an efficient means of conversing with gender binary species on terms they could understand. However, Liara has on at least one occasion responded to perceived gender bias and denied that she is a "woman", claiming that her species has "one" gender. Liara is a possible romantic interest for a male and female Commander Shepard throughout the entire Mass Effect trilogy.

Liara is the estranged child of Matriarch Benezia, a well-respected and powerful asari biotic. She is 106 years old during her first appearance, which is the equivalent to a young adult and within the Maiden stage of asari life. As a "pureblood", a term often used as a cruel insult for children born of two asari, Liara grew up being socially stigmatized by asari society. If Shepard discusses her parentage in the original Mass Effect, Liara would speculate that her parents were possibly embarrassed by the union as the asari believe that for them to improve themselves, they should mate with other species to gain new genetic properties. Mass Effect 3 reveals that Matriarch Aethyta is Liara's other biological parent, making her "one-quarter krogan" on Aethyta's side. Matriarch Aethyta is first encountered in Mass Effect 2 as a bartender in Illium, where Liara was based as an information broker. If Shepard questions her about this she initially claims that no one on Thessia wanted to listen to her council, hence the reason she works in a bar. She later moves on to tend a bar at the Presidium in Mass Effect 3, where she is revealed to have been spying on Liara all along.

Liara is a polymath, having earned over a dozen doctorates from the galaxies' most prestigious universities on the home planet of Thessia. Liara is the leading authority in her field of Prothean archeology, which is a feat in and of itself given her relative youth within her race. She's also a capable combatant, herself stating that until an entire geth platoon and Krogan Battlemaster ambushed her, she never found herself in a battle her biotics couldn't handle. While she is legally age of majority under Citadel law, her research is not taken seriously by other asari who consider her to be too young to be academically reputable. In spite of her culturally young age, she is depicted in the series as a child prodigy, possessing the skills and experience of a computer scientist, xenoarchaeologist, philologist, and cryptanalyst that far exceed her developmental age.

== Concept and design ==
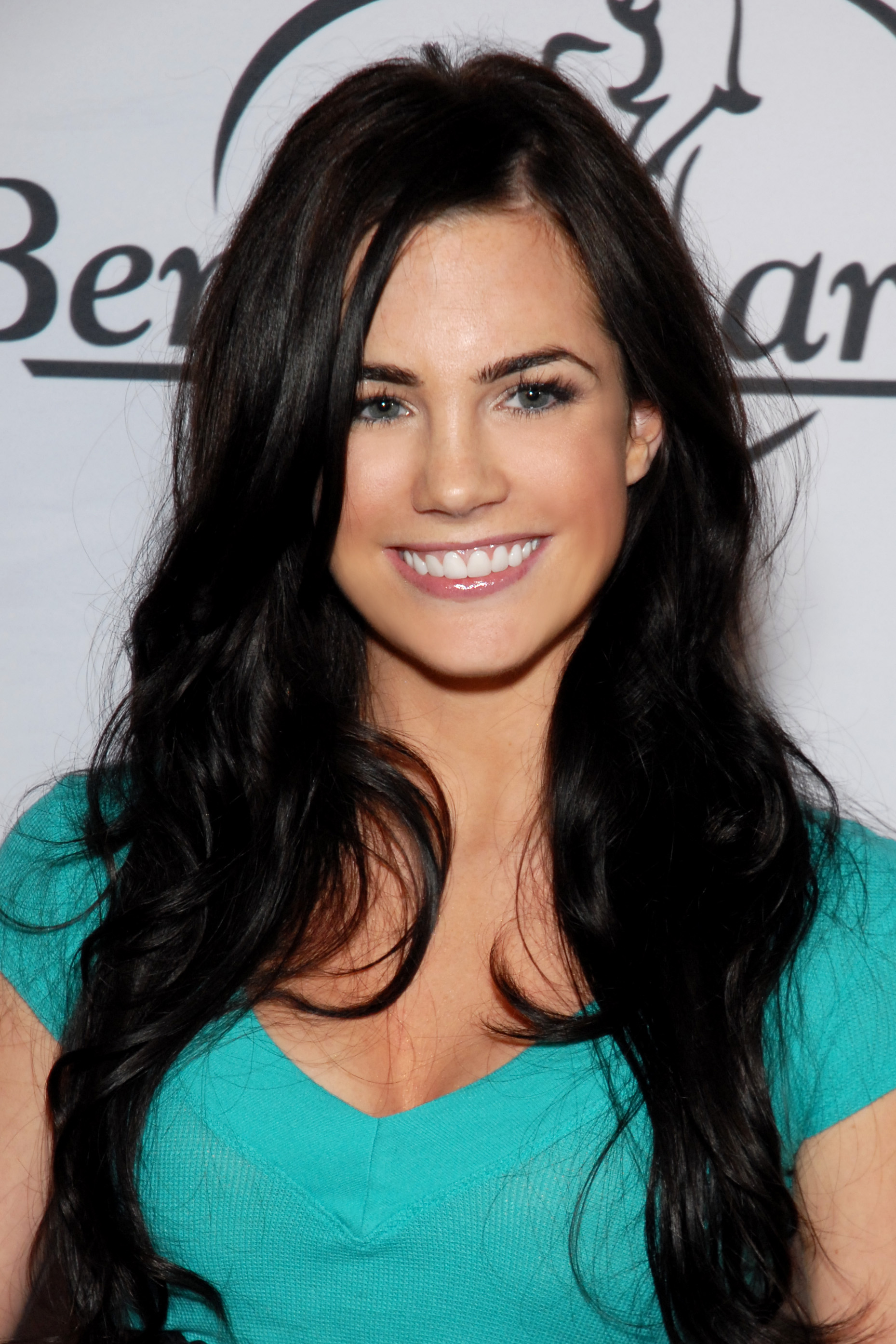
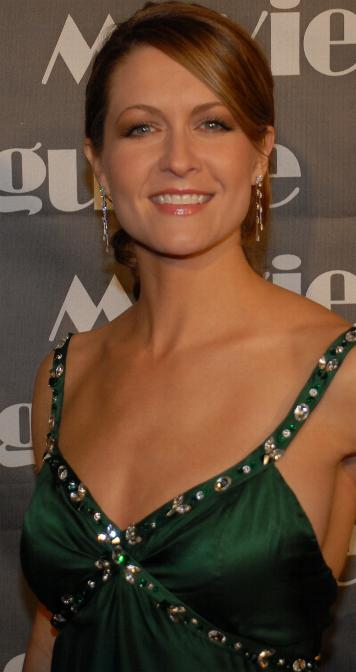
Jillian Murray (left) and Ali Hillis (right) are Liara's face model and voice actress respectively.

Unlike other alien characters made for the game, Liara's face did not have a specific design; her face was taken from the original concepts of the asari, who are conceived as "beautiful, blue aliens" to add a familiar science fiction element to the series. Instead of facepaint which is often used by the design team to diversify asari characters, Liara's facial design incorporates blue-colored freckles. The asari's human-like faces helped the designers in making the characters distinct; face and/or body scans of professional models have been used as the basis for their facial features. American actress Jillian Murray provided her likeness for Liara's final design.

Liara's default appearance in the first Mass Effect is a green medical uniform, while her outfit from the Mass Effect 2: Lair of the Shadow Broker DLC pack was retained as her default appearance for Mass Effect 3. The white jacket is a reminder of her background in science, while the more armor-like pieces serves a reminder to the player that the galaxy is at war, and that civilians are part of the war effort where they have to arm and defend themselves.

Side by side comparisons between Liara's original character model (left) in Mass Effect, and the remastered version (right) in Mass Effect Legendary Edition.

As part of BioWare's efforts to create a more realistic aesthetic when remastering the original trilogy for Mass Effect Legendary Edition, Liara's character model from the first Mass Effect underwent some changes: in Legendary Edition, the texturization of her face is better defined with the application of graphical tweaks and lighting adjustments. This is intended to accurately reflect the story canon of her personality, having transitioned from a "doe-eyed" character to a confident and powerful information broker over the course of the original trilogy. Legendary Edition environment and character director Kevin Meek explained in an interview that the team took precaution with their creative decisions for the remaster and tried not to alter how she fundamentally looks in the first game by augmenting her body style or outfit of choice, as they had to "live within the rails of what narratively was her art".

=== Portrayal ===
Liara T'Soni was Ali Hillis' first voice acting role for a video game. When she first began voicing Liara, she only had a still drawing of Liara to refer to; Hillis was unfamiliar with voicing video game characters nor did she expect much out of the character. To prepare for the role, particularly for a complicated character like Liara, she would try to "find an essence, a simplicity of a character". She credited voice director Ginny McSwain for guiding her through the entire process by explaining to her Liara's background, who she was and the different layers of her personality.

Hillis interpreted her core personality to be an inquisitive and observant scientist who is always learning everything that she could, and is deeply emotional, childlike, and reactionary in the way she goes about things. She noted that everything in Liara's life, especially in her relationships before she "started to evolve" after the first game, is akin to a coming-of-age discovery for the character. Hillis envisioned Liara to be so pure, that she lacked the capacity to be mean-spirited or self-serving in any way.

== Appearances ==
=== In video games ===
==== Mass Effect ====
Following the exposure of Benezia's involvement with the disgraced Spectre Saren Arterius and their search for an artifact known as the Conduit, Shepard is given a lead to search for Liara and discover what she knows. Liara pleads with Shepard for help when they encounter her in Therum, offering to explain her circumstances and means to be freed. If Shepard pursues other leads first and significantly delays rescuing Liara, she mistakes her rescuers for figments of her own imagination, and decides to humors her "hallucinations" by answering their questions. She only realizes Shepard's squad are real when they reappear to release her.

On her first debriefing aboard the Normandy, Liara shares her theory of cyclical extinction: the Protheans were just the latest in a long line of civilizations to reach a violent end after reaching their apex. Liara notes that there is remarkably little evidence of the Protheans' existence, and speculates that their final fate has been deliberately covered up. As Shepard obtains fragmented visions from various sources during the hunt for Saren and his agents, Liara offers her melding abilities to try and make sense of the data. She constantly exhausts herself after each encounter, prompting frequent suggestions to report to Dr. Chakwas, but collects herself together long enough to explain what she saw. Once Shepard obtains the Cipher, the Mu Relay's location, and the distress call from the Prothean Beacon on Virmire, Liara finally recognizes enough clues to deduce the lost planet of Ilos as the Conduit's true location.

==== Mass Effect 2 ====
Liara's role in the original trilogy is reduced in Mass Effect 2, set two years after the first game. Liara has become an information broker on Illium in direct rivalry to the Shadow Broker. She is initially presented with an apparently changed personality due to her experience working as a black market information dealer in the two years since Mass Effect; having improved her biotic abilities, she also uses threats and other intimidation tactics to extort information, mimicking Benezia's demeanor and speech tactics when confronting others. After speaking to her, the player may discover that her seemingly darker personality is nothing more than a façade. Liara explains that Shepard's body was recovered by the Shadow Broker, who was prepared to sell it to the Collectors during the events of Mass Effect: Redemption, but was thwarted by her and her drell associate Feron. Liara declines Shepard's offer to join the suicide mission to rescue human colonists in order to continue her vendetta against the Shadow Broker and save Feron, who was captured while she successfully escaped with Shepard's body.

Liara accompanies Shepard temporarily in the Mass Effect 2 DLC Lair of the Shadow Broker if the player decides to help her hunt down the Shadow Broker. Shepard gradually breaks her hardened shell after lecturing her about reckless behavior in battle, but at the same time she states that she won't stop "to enjoy the scenery" until she's done. After the Shadow Broker is killed, Liara takes the opportunity to usurp his now vacant role. She says she will use her position and resources to help assist Shepard's ongoing mission to fight the Reapers. It is also possible to resume the player character's romance arc with Liara at the end of "Lair of the Shadow Broker".

==== Mass Effect 3 ====
Liara returns in Mass Effect 3 as a permanent member of Shepard's squad. Liara becomes the Shadow Broker regardless of whether the player imports a Mass Effect 2 saved game where Lair of the Shadow Broker was completed; if not, she tells Shepard that she took on the Shadow Broker with dozens of hired mercenaries, but Feron died in the process. If Shepard assisted her in taking out the Shadow Broker, she mentions that during the time that Shepard was in Alliance custody, Cerberus managed to track down the Shadow Broker's ship. Liara and Feron loaded as much equipment as they could onto a shuttle as possible, then remotely sent the aging ship crashing into a pursuing Cerberus cruiser, resulting in the destruction of both ships. Liara notes that she has retained the crucial part of the Broker's operation, the galaxy-wide spy network. Liara's familiarity with Prothean artifacts as well as asari culture and history, along with the significant resources at her disposal as the Shadow Broker, positions the character in a pivotal role within Mass Effect 3's narrative, where she often provides additional dialogue for plot exposition purposes if she is included in the party during certain missions.

Following the events of Mass Effect 2: Arrival, Admiral Hackett commissioned for Liara's aid to find a solution and prepare the galaxy for the Reapers' imminent arrival. Through a process of elimination, mixed with desperation, she discovered plans for a "Prothean superweapon" on Mars. By this point, the Reaper invasion has reached Earth, and she is pursued by Cerberus forces. During the war, Liara records a collection of intel on the Reapers and her current cycle, as well as the complete history of the contemporary species of her time and their accumulated knowledge of how to fight the Reapers. She stores the information within Glyph, her VI drone assistant, and stashes it away as a time capsule. The time capsule represents a contingency plan if the allied races of her time are not able to defeat the Reapers in this cycle and are wiped out, ensuring the next cycle will have a better opportunity to prepare for the Reapers' arrival, and a complete set of plans to start out from.

If the Mass Effect 3: From Ashes DLC pack is installed and the Prothean endling Javik is recruited as a squad member, she is initially overjoyed to have one serving aboard the Normandy, but slowly becomes disillusioned; she admitted that she had previously imagined the Protheans as the "keepers of wisdom and enlightenment" of their era, only to find them to be "cold and ruthless warlords". Eventually, her relationship with Javik reaches a breaking point after the fall of Thessia; Liara confronts Javik at his quarters and vents her frustration at him for "not having the answers". If Shepard intervenes to defuse the situation instead of allowing Liara to walk away, the two will begin to respect and appreciate each other.

During the main narrative of the Mass Effect 3: Citadel DLC pack, Liara calls in a favor to find information on the gun found by Shepard after they are attacked by an unknown mercenary group during the crew's shore leave. She will later participate in the raid on the Citadel Archives with the rest of Shepard's crew to pursue the instigators behind the group's attack. The DLC also adds a number of character moments for the character, such as her piano playing, and her friendly rivalry with James Vega through debates and card games during the big party.

==== Mass Effect: Andromeda ====
Liara T'Soni makes a minor appearance in Mass Effect: Andromeda, in the form of voice messages sent to Alec Ryder in his quarters aboard the Hyperion. Pathfinder Ryder can unlock and listen to Liara's voice messages, which were originally sent in 2182, a year before her encounter with Shepard, where she discussed her research into the Protheans and their lost empire. Eventually, Ryder will unlock a message by Liara from 2186, sent to Alec while he was in stasis on the Hyperion traveling to Andromeda, informing him that the Reapers have arrived. She mentions the Crucible but warns Alec to expect the worst, and asks him and his children to not forget the people they left behind.

=== In other media ===
==== Mass Effect: Redemption ====
The narrative in Redemption begins in the aftermath of the destruction of the SSV Normandy as depicted during the opening gameplay sequence of Mass Effect 2. Liara T'Soni attempts to find and retrieve the dead body of Commander Shepard and give it to Cerberus so they could bring Shepard back to life. She soon discovers that the Shadow Broker, represented by his salarian agent Tazzik, has acquired Shepard's remains and wants to turn it over to the Collectors. Liara manages to acquire Shepard's body with Feron's help. Liara knew that Cerberus may use Shepard's body for their own purposes, but still gave them Shepard's body as she cares for Shepard.

==== Mass Effect: Paragon Lost ====
Liara appears as a minor character in the animated feature film Mass Effect: Paragon Lost. This marks the only instance where Ali Hillis did not reprise her role as the character.

==== Mass Effect: Homeworlds ====
Liara is the protagonist of the fourth issue of Mass Effect: Homeworlds, which takes place after the Lair of the Shadow Broker DLC. As the new Shadow Broker, Liara desperately searches for a way to stop the Reapers. Journeying to Thessia to examine the Prothean archives there, she is disappointed to learn how little they contain. A former colleague recommends investigating Kahje since its Prothean ruins are much more vast. Once there, Liara persuades a hanar official to allow her to visit a submerged Prothean site that had become a hanar shrine. A drell named Quoyle takes her to the shrine, but on arrival the shrine launches torpedoes at Quoyle's craft; a Cerberus Phantom had killed the shrine's staff and activated the defenses. When the craft is hit, Liara uses her biotics to keep it from flooding while Quoyle guides it to the dock.

At the shrine, Liara encounters and kills the Phantom, using her biotics to slam a piece of debris through the Phantom's skull. Quoyle is wounded, but not mortally and tells Liara to go on to the archives. There, Liara discovers a promising lead in the form of encryption keys for other Prothean archives, but is interrupted by the Illusive Man. He insists that the Phantom is not his doing, blaming the attack on a rogue faction within Cerberus and proposes that they form an alliance against the Reapers. Liara agrees that to pool her resources with Cerberus's against the Reapers might be a mutually beneficial move, but she insists that he upload his information first. When the Illusive Man remains silent, Liara opines that either he wants to keep the information he has to himself, or that he doesn't have any information in the first place.

As Liara goes to leave, the Illusive Man insinuates that she doesn't have what it takes to be the Shadow Broker, claiming that his black market contacts think the Broker has become soft, weak and vulnerable to usurpation, insisting she needs his help; Liara retorts that he is the one trying to make a deal, advises him to send an army the next time he tries to kill her and leaves. As she helps Quoyle to the shrine's shuttle bay, she informs Admiral Hackett of her possible lead and asks for access to a top-secret facility on Mars.

== Promotion and merchandise ==
Like Shepard's other squad members, merchandise was made of Liara T'Soni. A bishoujo figure of her was released by Kotobukiya in May 2012. BioWare initially released preview images of the figure in September 2011, and later reduced the surface area around the breasts from the initial design following fan feedback. Other notable merchandise include a Liara mimobot flash sold by BioWare's store, and a figure of Liara released by Gaming Heads in early 2015.

To commemorate the release of Mass Effect Legendary Edition in May 2021, Liara's likeness is used as part of a series of limited edition statues to be released in mid-2021.

== Cultural impact ==
=== Reception ===
"Liara is conflicted. By her mummy issues, by her lack of romantic experience, and by her inability to lie—but those doubts are offset by the sense of wonder and hope she brings to proceedings. As such she makes a fascinating alternate lens through which to view the Mass Effect universe. Unlike much of the cast, Liara is rarely sure about her answers (check out her doubts about the Krogan cure in the third game, for instance), which makes for a consistently interesting travel companion."

— PC Gamer, "The Mass Effect companions, ranked from worst to best"

Liara T'Soni has been well received by players and video game journalists since the inception of the Mass Effect franchise, and the potential romance with her has also been of some interest. GamesRadar's Jordan Baughman cited Liara's characterization in the first game as an example of BioWare's "The Awkward Hottie" character archetype, specifically a "naive beauty who doesn't truly understand how harsh the world/universe can be" and who "turns into an absolute mess when placed in social settings". In a 2007 article written for GameSetWatch, Chris Dahlen explained that while he found Mass Effect disappointing, particularly the lacklustre characterization of its non-playable characters, he noted that Liara was the "less obnoxious" of the available romance options and her explanations about the asari species to be well articulated. Pri Sanchay from Hardcore Gaming 101 noted that Liara's role as an alien love interest is similar to Star Control II's Talana, a member of the Syreen species which also inspire the concept behind the asari; the difference is that Mass Effect treats interspecies romance with "sincere complexity", whereas Star Control II lampoons the alien sex trope.

Following the release of Mass Effect 3, various media outlets have identified Liara as one of the best characters from the original Mass Effect trilogy in various character lists. Daniel Nye Griffiths from Forbes argued that Liara is the real hero of the Mass Effect series as she played an important role throughout the original trilogy with assisting Shepard's struggle against the Reapers and their indoctrinated servants, noting that the time capsule Liara has prepared may still play a pivotal role in preparing future Milky Way races for the Reapers' threat if the organic races of their cycle are ultimately extinguished. In a 2016 article, PC Gamer staff ranked Liara the fourth best companion of the Mass Effect series and lauded the character's "killer story arc", her role in "providing counterbalancing compassion to Shepard's necessary cynicism", and giving the Mass Effect series heart "without it having to be constantly bleeding".

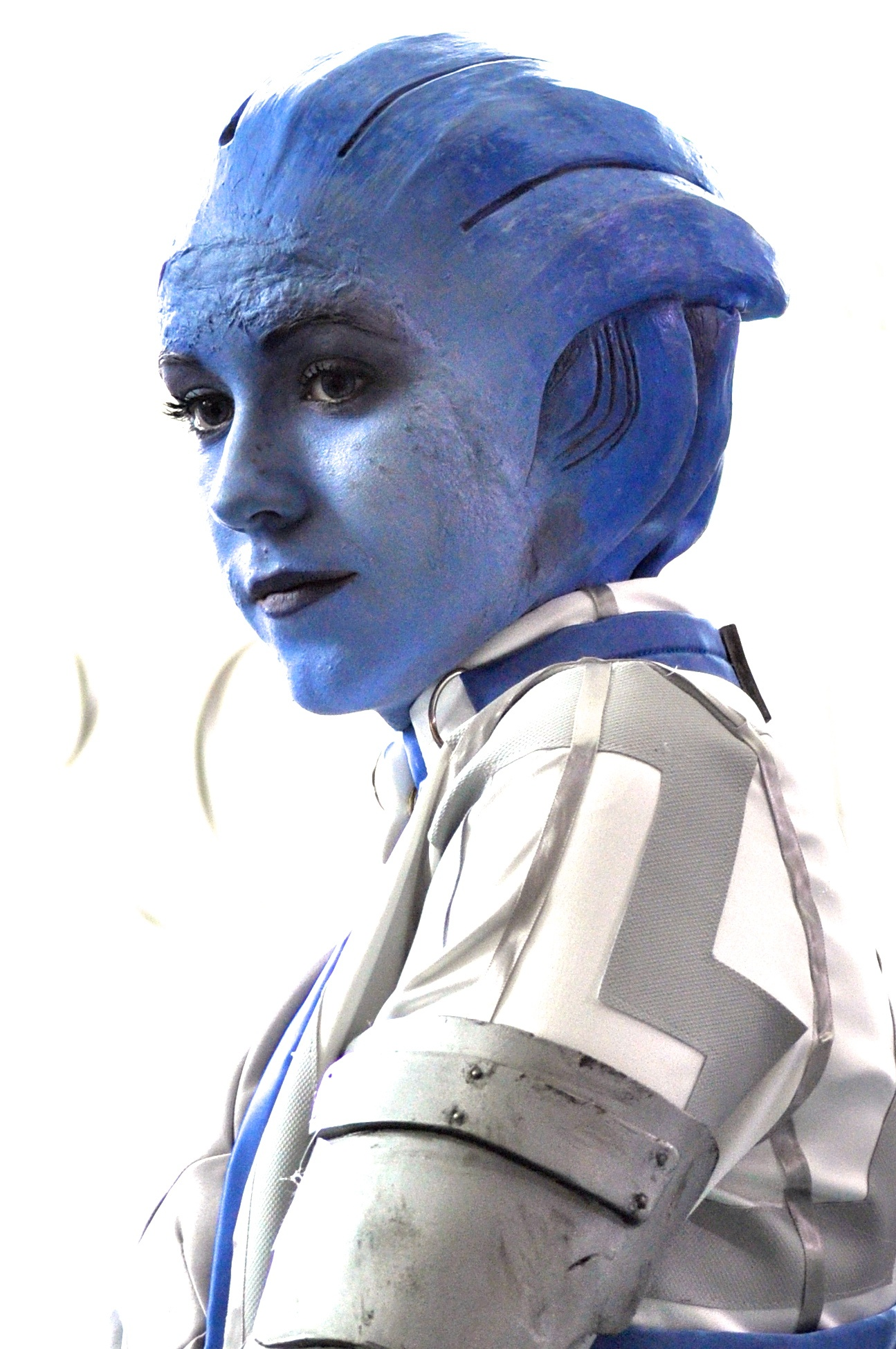
A fan cosplaying as Liara.

Liara remained a fan favorite after the conclusion of the Mass Effect trilogy, and is one of the more popular characters in the series, particularly for fan art and cosplay activities. A reader's poll published by IGN in December 2014 for their top ultimate RPG party choices placed Liara at #15 under the reserves section. Another reader's poll published by PC Gamer in 2015 reveal that Liara was overall the fourth most popular Mass Effect character, and the most popular love interest for Shepard. Player statistics published by Guinness World Records revealed that Liara T'Soni was the most popular Mass Effect 3 squad member with 24.1% of the votes, as well as the overall most popular romance option among respondents with 29% of the vote. Tim Clark from PC Gamer considered Liara to be his personal favorite Bioware companion, as did Aidan Simonds from Playstation Lifestyle. Clark commented that "it's testament to the skill of BioWare's writers that she isn't reduced to just being the drippy, peace-loving, science-y one. I mean, she's all those things, but she's also more complex", and claimed that the character motivated him "to be a better Shepard". Mike Fahey from Kotaku praised Liara's freckles as a design choice, saying it gives the character "a life I wouldn't normally expect from an alien creature in a brand-spanking new science fiction universe." Jess McDonell from GameSpot picked Liara as her ideal real-life date.

In a retrospective examination of Liara's story arc in the trilogy, Simmonds said Liara's well rounded characterization is a good example of a character who benefits from a consistent narrative through the original trilogy. Lee Hutchinson from Ars Technica reflected on the various romance options and subplots integrated throughout the trilogy, and concluded that BioWare designed Mass Effect 3 with Liara "as the canonical romance choice—you run into her first, and she's with you the longest, and she has tons of dialog and is one of the more complete bedroom scenes near the end". Stacey Henley from VG247 noted that the culmination of Liara's character arc sees her "doe-eyed, schoolgirl naivety hardened into something steelier" by the events of Mass Effect 3. Liana Ruppert from Game Informer felt that the metamorphosis of her personality throughout the trilogy was never visualized in any meaningful way other than a change in her default outfit as well as her voiced lines. Within that context, Ruppert felt that the graphical changes and improvements introduced by Legendary Edition finally reflects her complexity and gives the character "even more life than she had before".

=== Portrayal as a queer character ===
Liara T'Soni is seen by some sources as a notable example of the consistently positive portrayal of LGBT characters in the Mass Effect series, and by extension an important representation of LGBT characters in video games due to her potential romance with a female player character which is coded as lesbianism. The Advocate, Gay Community News and the gay social network app Hornet considered Liara to be one of the best or greatest queer video games characters of all time. Conversely, Grace Benfell scrutinized Liara's potential same-sex relationship with Shepard, "one that can be immediately exchanged for a normative straight relationship", and observed that it is the "only kind of queerness" recognized by the franchise's narrative when contrasting her story arc with that of another pureblood asari character, Morinth.

A cutscene from the original Mass Effect containing depictions of partial nudity and sexual activity between Liara and Shepard, particularly if the latter is female, was notable for attracting controversy. The game was initially banned in Singapore, which led to an outcry amongst the local and international gaming community. Censors in the country specifically blamed the lesbian encounter between a female alien (Liara) and a female Shepard as the main reason why the game was subjected to the ban. The ban was lifted after Mass Effect was issued with a M18 rating soon afterwards.
