= Steve Cortez =

- Mass Effect character
- Steve Cortez as he appears in Mass Effect 3
- First appearance: Mass Effect 3 (2012)
- Voiced by: Matthew Del Negro

Steve Cortez is a character from BioWare's Mass Effect franchise. He appears in the 2012 video game Mass Effect 3 as a crew member of the SSV Normandy SR-2 and pilot of the starship's auxiliary shuttlecraft vehicle, the UT-47A Kodiak. Cortez was designed as a potential love interest for the male version of the game's player character, Commander Shepard.

The staff writer responsible for Cortez, Dusty Everman, wanted to approach the subject matter of same-sex romantic relationships with an eye for respect and authenticity, as Mass Effect 3 marked the first instance BioWare staff have written full romances that are exclusively for same-sex characters. Everman was mindful of concerns raised by players where a relationship between Shepard and a non-player character in previous games may inexplicably shift from a friendship into a romance to their surprise. The approach he took in response was to frame the majority of the relationship to be about the progression of a friendship, and that romantic feelings only surface by the end of the arc once the character's backstory is shared with Shepard in greater detail.

Cortez's story arc in Mass Effect 3 drew a varied response from critics and players, and become part of a wider discussion about the media portrayal of LGBT characters, particularly with its themes of heartbreak and loss. Some commentators drew attention to his identity as a military serviceman who is an openly gay man and person of color, and the implications such characteristics would have from a real world perspective.

== Concept and design ==
Steve Cortez was written by Dusty Everman, who worked primarily as a level designer early in his career at BioWare. Prior to Mass Effect 3, Everman had the opportunity to write for several supporting characters onboard the Normandy in Mass Effect 2, including Yeoman Kelly Chambers who the player character Commander Shepard could have a "light, flirty romance" with. By contrast, his goal for a romance centered around Cortez was to write about a "meaningful human relationship that just happens to be between two men", and at the same time supporting the game's theme of total interstellar war and the consequent widespread loss of life.

Speaking about his writing work in a post uploaded to the BioWare blog, Everman conceded that he could not write from personal experience and that some players had concerns about a relationship with a non-player character unintentionally shifting from friendly to romantic to the player’s apparent surprise, which in his view seemed greater for same-sex romances. As a result, Everman wanted to keep Cortez grounded as a character, and designed Cortez's dialogue tree to allow players to get to know him regardless of the player character's presumed sexual orientation. Everman noted that Cortez's arc is about his shared journey with Shepard and the building friendship between both characters, which he hope would lead players to a genuine appreciation for him as an attractive romantic interest towards the end of the arc. Everman insisted that "not one word was written lightly", as he expected that his work on Cortez would be heavily scrutinized given the nature of the relationship.

Although Steve Cortez is presented as a person of color in Mass Effect 3, his initial character designs had a lighter skin color, which led to many of his scenes being dimly lit by design. Casey Hudson picked the character's final look, while artist Rion Swanson was responsible for Cortez's artwork. As the change occurred late in the game's development, there was not enough time to adjust the degree of lighting that would complement his final skin tone. Leo Lucien-Bay served as the cinematic designer for a dance scene at the Purgatory dance club which features Cortez, which he completed under intensive time constraints.

== Appearances ==
Lieutenant Steven "Steve" Cortez is introduced in Mass Effect 3 as a Systems Alliance commissioned officer who is assigned to the Normandy SR-2 for overseeing cargo bay modifications prior to the galaxy-wide Reaper invasion. He is responsible for maintaining the Normandy's armory alongside his close friend James Vega. Cortez is also the pilot of an auxiliary vehicle, the UT-47A Kodiak, and is responsible for transporting Commander Shepard's fire squad to and from the Normandy for field missions.

If the player chooses to engage with Cortez during mission downtime, Shepard discovers that he rarely takes time off from his duties and that he still grieves over the loss of his husband, Robert, to the Collectors, an antagonistic alien faction introduced in Mass Effect 2. Shepard may chooses to be supportive towards Cortez during their conversations: the latter eventually finds the strength to move on from his mourning in despair, and survives the crashing of his shuttle during the final assault on Earth towards the end of Mass Effect 3's story. Cortez will also develop feelings for a male Shepard, and both men will enter into a relationship provided the player decides to have Shepard reciprocate his affections.

== Reception and controversy ==
Shortly after the release of Mass Effect 3, a YouTube video which shows an intimate scene between Cortez and a male Commander Shepherd provoked a hostile reaction among certain players. Craig Takeuchi from the Georgia Straight highlighted instances of negative and homophobic comments against the game's same-sex relationship content, especially the scene between Shepard and Cortez, which were posted on several websites. Kevin VanOrd from GameSpot claimed that he was subjected to verbal abuse from a reader, who specifically referenced Cortez's perceived ethnicity as well as sexual orientation to insult VanOrd in response to the latter's review of Mass Effect 3. By April 2012, Jeff Brown, vice-president of corporate communications at EA, claimed that his company was inundated by "several thousand" letters and emails protesting the inclusion of LGBT content in the video games it publishes like Mass Effect 3.

Several commentators concluded that the backlash was primarily driven by disapproval over the unprecedented depiction of male homosexuality in the series. Andreas Blüml observed that lesbian or pseudo-lesbian options for female characters was in fact the norm throughout the trilogy, whereas the inclusion of same-sex options for male characters in Mass Effect 3 is the anomaly and started what the media termed a "gay controversy" in the United States. In a 2016 article about gay characters in mainstream video games published by Forbes, Paul Tassi scrutinized the notoriety surrounding the “Mass Effect Gay Sex Scene”, and concluded that it was merely shirtless cuddling between Shepard and Cortez upon reflection.

Cortez received an overall mixed critical reception. Samantha Blackmon from NYMG lauded Cortez's storyline as a good example of how queer characters in video games may serve a broader purpose beyond a simple affirmation of real-life people who identify as LGBTQ, providing depth not only to the main storyline of Mass Effect 3 but also to the story arcs of the game's other characters. Kenneth Shepard from Fanbyte opined that though Cortez's romance arc provides a good reason for players to be wary of a romantic relationship with a widower who is deeply grieving his recently deceased partner, it is still an overall solid effort built upon Mass Effect 3's dire themes, having benefitted from the game's stronger focus on personal and substantive romantic relationships compared to its predecessors. Alex Knapp, on the other hand, was uncomfortable with the notion of a romance story arc with Cortez because of how quickly a player-controlled Shepard could romance Cortez soon after convincing him to let go of his past and his grief, which struck him as "a little predatory" in tone. Nevertheless, Knapp expressed his enthusiasm about the quality of writing for Cortez and the significance of his identity as an openly gay male character in popular media. Matthew Byrd from Den of Geek noted his significance as the first male romantic partner exclusive to male Shepard characters, but gave the character's romance arc a middling rating due to what he perceived to be its lack of excitement, as well as Cortez's underdeveloped characterization.

=== Analysis ===
The International Journal of Computer Game Research published two articles in the year 2018, which critically analyzed Cortez's representation as a military professional who identifies as a queer person of color.

Theresa Krampe examined the ludic and narrative presentation of non-hegemonic masculinities in the Mass Effect trilogy from a queer game studies perspective, and discussed how the prominent position of a queer man of color like Cortez challenges the dominance of the "white, heterosexual, attractive, male videogame protagonist" and reclaim cultural space for marginalized subject positions. In her analysis, she identified Cortez as a character who is "visibly black", a quality that she asserted is "far from trivial when considering the invisibility of non-white characters in AAA-games". Kremp examined each potential branching story possibility for Cortez's relationship with Shepard, highlighting in particular the scenario where Shepard and Cortez form a romantic relationship: she found that although the tone of the character's shirtless scene with Shepard is more domestic as opposed to erotic, they still emphasized the "black body at the centre of attention, thus turning it into a visual spectacle". In this scenario, Kremp argued that Cortez' "otherness" as represented by his bare body realizes its subversive potential as it becomes irrevocably visible, resisting not only the "pressures of heteronormativity but also the naturalized link between LGBTQ and hegemonic whiteness".

Jordan Youngblood analyzed how LGBTQ-identifying characters like Cortez are integrated into a "larger systemic ludic process of thinking" about populations who are reduced into numbers and resources to be leveraged in the Mass Effect trilogy. To Youngblood, Cortez's presentation "fuse benign queerness to questions of race", given his dark brown skin tone, occasional bantering in Spanish with his crewmate, and story arc as an openly-gay man who recently lost his husband to war. He observed that Mass Effect 3 make it a point to characterize Cortez with an unthreatening personality, as a military serviceman who is eager to fight for the right to "sustain normative assumptions of LGBTQ life and family structure in the present day", and alluded to a quote from an Everman interview which he believed carried an implication that there is a "full assimilation of gays and lesbians into the nuclear family structure and domestic lifestyle" by the 22nd century. He further noted that Cortez, being an exclusive same-sex partner, is treated differently from Samantha Traynor, an exclusive same sex romance option for female player characters, when it comes to the prioritization of when and how their bodies will be exposed, because he is only seen sexually with a male Shepard once in a sequence that is far less explicit and brief when contrasted with similar scenes that feature Traynor.
