= Mass Effect: Paragon Lost =

- UK/Ireland DVD/Blu-ray Disc cover

Japanese name
- Kanji: マスエフェクト：パラゴン・ロスト
Transcriptions
- Revised Hepburn: Masuefekuto: Paragon rosuto
- Directed by: Atsushi Takeuchi
- Written by: Henry Gilroy
- Based on: Mass Effect 2 by BioWare
- Produced by: April Bennett; Justin Cook; Manami Fukawa
- Starring: Freddie Prinze Jr.; Monica Rial; Jad Saxton; Laura Bailey; Eric Vale; Vic Mignogna; Todd Haberkorn; Travis Willingham; Justin Cook
- Music by: Joshua Mosley; David Kates
- Production company: Production I.G
- Distributed by: Funimation
- Release dates: November 29, 2012 (Limited theatrical release); December 14, 2012 (Digital release)
- Running time: 84 minutes
- Countries: Japan; United States; Canada; South Korea
- Languages: English; Japanese

Mass Effect: Paragon Lost (Japanese: マスエフェクト：パラゴン・ロスト, Hepburn: Masuefekuto: Paragon rosuto) is a 2012 American-Japanese adult animated science fiction action film set in the Mass Effect science fiction universe during the events of Mass Effect 2.

== Plot ==
In 2183, the human colony of Fehl Prime, a major producer of pharmaceuticals for the Systems Alliance, comes under attack by a group of Blood Pack mercenaries led by the krogan Archuk. In response, the Alliance dispatches several teams of Marines to aid the beleaguered colonists. During the landing attempt, only one Marine unit, Delta Squad, survives the crash landing of their shuttle. Lieutenant James Vega assumes command of Delta Squad after Captain Toni is incapacitated. With the aid of squadmates Kamille, Nicky, Milque, Essex, and Mason, Vega successfully kills Archuk and captures his second-in-command, Brood. In the aftermath, Admiral Steven Hackett orders Delta Squad to protect Fehl Prime from future attacks.

In 2185, Fehl Prime has recovered and the Alliance has bolstered the colony's defenses with a heavy anti-ship cannon and military-grade kinetic barriers. While installing the defenses, Delta Squad discovers an unknown alien device emitting a signal. Treeya presents her findings to Liara T'Soni, only for the communications to get jammed when Liara speculates the device being Reaper tech. As the group returns to the colony, they spot an invading Collector ship.

The Collector ship deploys Seeker Swarms to incapacitate Fehl Prime's colonists, including Captain Toni. Unable to prevent the colonists' capture, Delta Squad attempts to disable the Collector ship with the colony's anti-ship cannon, but fail when the cannon is destroyed. As Delta Squad retreats to the secure underground labs beneath the colony, Kamille is snatched away by drones and Essex is paralyzed by Seekers while defending the labs' door.

While underground, Delta Squad learns that Messner is actually a Cerberus agent who had been trying access the labs. Delta Squad also discovers a possible antidote for the Seeker Swarms' paralyzing agent, as well as Brood, who had been kept in a tank as a test subject in the labs. Without warning, the door to the labs is then torn open by a Praetorian with Kamille's body incorporated into it. Mason is killed while attempting to save Kamille, and Delta Squad is forced to retreat with Brood. Brood leads Delta Squad to his hidden ship to repay his debt to Vega. As the group lifts off aboard Brood's ship, the Praetorian emerges and gives chase, killing Nicky before perishing. Vega orders a frontal assault on the Collector ship and successfully boards it. However, Messner kills Brood, leading to Delta Squad's capture.

Now in orbit, the Collector ship incinerates the remains of the colony to cover their tracks. Deep within the ship, Messner explains to Treeya that he was the one who planted the alien device in order to lure the Collectors and capture their technology for Cerberus's benefit. He takes Treeya with him to another part of the ship, leaving Vega, Essex, and Milque locked in pods. Unbeknownst to Messner or the Collectors, a drink Vega had given everyone earlier had been spiked with the Seeker Swarm antidote, and the three are able to escape and kill their guards. Vega and Essex pursue Messner and Treeya, while Milque secures transport for their escape.

Elsewhere, Messner shows Treeya a Prothean archive built into the Collector ship and has her access it. Treeya witnesses footage of the Protheans' last stand against the Reapers, their transformation into the Collectors, and the Collectors' construction of a human-shaped Reaper at their homeworld. Messner records this information on his bracelet, only to be double-crossed by the Collectors. When Messner tries to bargain with the Collectors, Treeya steals the bracelet before escaping in a containment pod.

Vega and Essex fight the Collectors, killing them and damaging the Collector ship's controls. Essex is impaled by the claw of the ship's pilot and uses his biotics to fling them both into a chasm, where they fall to their deaths. Messner fires on Vega, but Vega disarms and stabs him in the stomach, before spitefully leaving Messner to die in the ship's explosion. Vega demands Messner's intel on the Collectors and learns of Treeya's possession of it. Left between the choice of evacuating the colonists on a now-pilotless ship or saving Treeya and the Collector intel, Vega chooses the latter. As Treeya's pod is retrieved, the Collector ship crashes into Fehl Prime's surface and explodes, killing Captain Toni and the colonists, leaving Vega, Milque, and Treeya as the only survivors of the massacre.

On the Citadel, Vega is commended by David Anderson and Admiral Hackett, who inform him that the intel he saved was crucial, and that Commander Shepard was alive. They then give Vega a petition to join the N7 program. Some time later, the trio return to Fehl Prime to mourn the lives lost. Vega has a breakdown upon finding April's doll, blaming himself for all their deaths, eventually finding himself at a memorial set up by the Alliance. Vega remorsefully leaves April's dirtied badge and doll and his medal there and the survivors salute to their memory. Some time later, Vega is seen leading a squad into combat, vowing to continue fighting in the memories of April, Toni, and the colonists.

== Voice cast ==
- Freddie Prinze Jr. as Lieutenant James Vega
- Monica Rial as Treeya
- Vic Mignogna as Messner
- Todd Haberkorn as Milque
- Jesse James Grelle as Nicky
- Justin Cook as Brood
- Marc Swint as Mason
- Bruce Carey as Admiral Steven Hackett
- Jad Saxton as April
- Kara Edwards as Christine
- Jason Douglas as Archuk
- Patrick Seitz as Admiral David Anderson
- Eric Vale as Essex
- Laura Bailey as Kamille
- Travis Willingham as Captain Toni
- Jamie Marchi as Dr. Liara T'Soni

== Production ==
The film is produced by BioWare, FUNimation, T.O Entertainment and animated by Production I.G.

== Home media ==
The film was screened in select theaters on November 29, 2012. It was released for digital download on Xbox Live and PlayStation Network on December 14, 2012, and on DVD and Blu-ray on December 28, 2012.

== Soundtrack ==
Mass Effect: Paragon Lost Original Motion Picture Soundtrack

Soundtrack album by Joshua Mosley & David Kates
- Released: November 13, 2012
- Genre: Motion picture soundtrack
- Length: 1:09:28

The film's score was composed by Joshua R. Mosley and David Kates. Kates had previously worked on the soundtracks for Mass Effect and Mass Effect 2.

Mass Effect: Paragon Lost Original Motion Picture Soundtrack
No.	Title	Music	Length
1.	"Paragon Lost – Main Tile" (sic)	Joshua Mosley & David Kates	0:50
2.	"Alliance Marines"	Joshua Mosley & David Kates	2:18
3.	"Krogan Battle"	Joshua Mosley & David Kates	4:04
4.	"Execution"	Joshua Mosley & David Kates	0:51
5.	"Wreckage"	Joshua Mosley & David Kates	2:26
6.	"Vega's Tactical"	Joshua Mosley & David Kates	6:12
7.	"Hell of a Battle, Son"	Joshua Mosley & David Kates	1:20
8.	"Terminus"	Joshua Mosley & David Kates	2:04
9.	"April"	Joshua Mosley & David Kates	2:08
10.	"The Mass Effect"	Joshua Mosley & David Kates	3:02
11.	"Collectors"	Joshua Mosley & David Kates	2:00
12.	"Down the Sinkhole"	Joshua Mosley & David Kates	2:30
13.	"The Cannon"	Joshua Mosley & David Kates	3:23
14.	"Collectors Carnage"	Joshua Mosley & David Kates	2:55
15.	"A Spy Revealed"	Joshua Mosley & David Kates	1:30
16.	"Enter Brood"	Joshua Mosley & David Kates	1:14
17.	"Your Are James Vega" (sic)	Joshua Mosley & David Kates	1:10
18.	"We Got Company"	Joshua Mosley & David Kates	4:47
19.	"Nicky"	Joshua Mosley & David Kates	0:52
20.	"Lost Souls"	Joshua Mosley & David Kates	1:46
21.	"The Cure"	Joshua Mosley & David Kates	2:11
22.	"Ascension"	Joshua Mosley & David Kates	3:08
23.	"Collect This!"	Joshua Mosley & David Kates	2:38
24.	"Paragon Is Lost"	Joshua Mosley & David Kates	3:33
25.	"The Emergance of Vega" (sic)	Joshua Mosley & David Kates	6:25
26.	"A Leader Is Born"	Joshua Mosley & David Kates	0:47
27.	"Warning Signs"	The Anix	3:24
Total length:			1:09:28
