= Freddie Prinze Jr. =

American actor (born 1976)

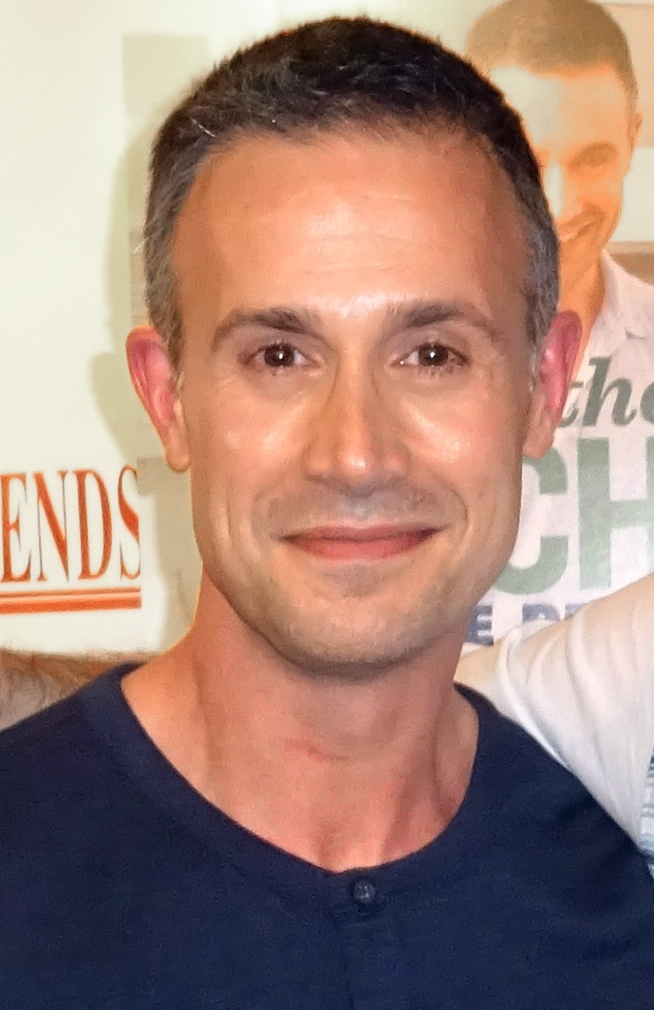
- Prinze in 2016
- Born: Freddie James Prinze Jr. March 8, 1976 (age 50); Los Angeles, California, U.S.
- Occupations: Actor; writer; producer
- Years active: 1995–present
- Spouse: Sarah Michelle Gellar (m. 2002)
- Children: 2
- Father: Freddie Prinze

Freddie James Prinze Jr. (born March 8, 1976) is an American actor. He has starred in films such as I Know What You Did Last Summer (1997) and its sequels I Still Know What You Did Last Summer (1998) and I Know What You Did Last Summer (2025), She's All That (1999), Down to You, Boys and Girls (both 2000), Summer Catch (2001), Scooby-Doo (2002), and Scooby-Doo 2: Monsters Unleashed (2004). Alongside recurring roles on Boston Legal (2004) and 24 (2010), Prinze starred on the self-titled ABC sitcom Freddie (2005–2006)—which he co-created and executive produced—and voiced Kanan Jarrus in the Disney XD series Star Wars Rebels (2014–2018) and the film Star Wars: The Rise of Skywalker (2019). Prinze also worked for WWE as a writer from 2007 to 2009 and then as a producer from 2010 to 2012. He is the only child of actor and comedian Freddie Prinze.

== Early life ==
Freddie James Prinze Jr. was born in Los Angeles on March 8, 1976, the only child of Katherine Elaine Prinze (née Cochran) and actor and stand-up comedian Freddie Prinze.

On January 29, 1977, Freddie Prinze died of a self-inflicted gunshot wound, after which Prinze Jr. relocated with his mother to Albuquerque, New Mexico. Prinze was raised Catholic. His paternal grandmother was from Puerto Rico and he is fluent in Spanish. Prinze had enjoyed acting in school productions as a child and participated in Albuquerque Children's Theatre, though he originally planned to become a civil engineer before getting roles on Family Matters and The Watcher. Soon after that, he saw Neil Patrick Harris at his high school getting kids excited about acting, and decided to become an actor. After graduating from La Cueva High School in 1994, Prinze moved to Los Angeles to audition for television roles.

== Career ==
=== Television and film ===
Prinze was cast in a guest role on the ABC TV series Family Matters in 1995. He then appeared in a few programs and made-for-TV movies, before making his motion picture debut in To Gillian on Her 37th Birthday in 1996. In subsequent years, Prinze's appearances in youth-oriented movies I Know What You Did Last Summer (1997) and its sequel I Still Know What You Did Last Summer (1998) made him known to teenage audiences. His first leading role was in the romantic comedy She's All That (1999), which grossed $63 million in the United States.

Subsequently, he had leading roles in Wing Commander (1999), Down to You (2000), Boys and Girls (2000), Head over Heels (2001), and Summer Catch (2001), most of which were disliked by critics and had moderate box office success.

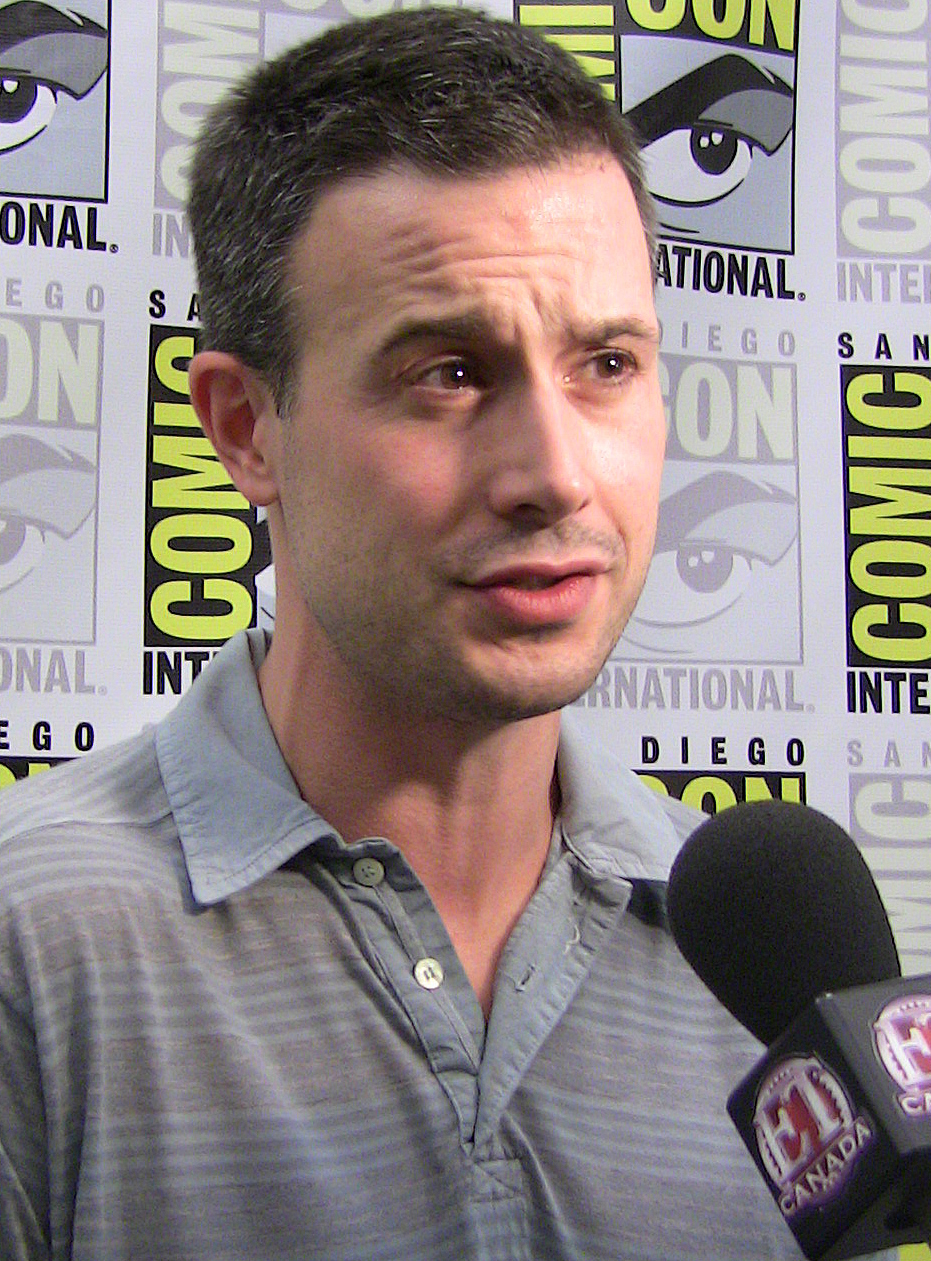
Prinze Jr. at the 2009 San Diego Comic-Con

He played Fred Jones in the 2002 live-action film version of the popular cartoon Scooby-Doo, and reprised the role in the 2004 sequel, Scooby-Doo 2: Monsters Unleashed, both alongside his wife Sarah Michelle Gellar and along with Matthew Lillard and Linda Cardellini. He guest starred on the popular NBC show Friends as a sensitive male nanny named Sandy on the series' 200th episode. He took the role of Sandy after Tom Hanks could not do it due to scheduling. He also appeared as Donny Crane, a character believed to be Denny Crane's son in the ABC legal drama-comedy Boston Legal. Prinze starred in his own television sitcom, titled Freddie. The sitcom is said to depict some actual events from his life, and was cancelled after one season in May 2006. He guest starred on George Lopez for a crossover with Freddie. In 2004, Prinze accepted a special award from TV Land on behalf of his late father. He thanked his father's former co-star Della Reese for her continued advice and support. In 2006, he lent his voice to the character of Pi in the animated film Shark Bait. Also in 2007, he lent his voice to the character of Rick in Happily N'Ever After along with his wife Gellar, Wallace Shawn, Andy Dick, George Carlin, and Sigourney Weaver. In 2008, he auditioned for Jigsaw in Punisher: War Zone, but was not given the part at the decision of Lionsgate Studios. He later was the voice of the titular character in the animated movie Delgo. In 2010, Prinze guest starred on Psych as Dennis, a grade school friend of Shawn Spencer and Burton Guster. In March 2019, Prinze was cast as Nancy Drew's father, Carson Drew, in The CW mystery pilot Nancy Drew, but was later replaced by Scott Wolf. He also voiced the future version of Tim and Jim Possible in the Kim Possible movie Kim Possible: A Sitch in Time.

In March 2009, it was announced that Prinze had signed on to star as Bradley, aka Ultimatum, in the ABC show No Heroics, an American remake of the British show of the same name. The show was not picked up, but Prinze was cast as a series regular for the eighth season of the television show 24; he played Cole Ortiz, a new CTU operative. In 2021, Prinze joined the reboot of Punky Brewster on Peacock, playing the title character's ex-husband.

=== Other work ===
Prinze and Chris Klein appeared in the 2002-03 West End production of Kenneth Lonergan's play This Is Our Youth, replacing original cast members Jake Gyllenhaal and Hayden Christensen.

He voiced a pilot in a Vatta's War: Trading in Danger graphic audio book. Prinze voiced different characters in BioWare video games: Lieutenant James Vega in Mass Effect 3 and The Iron Bull in Dragon Age: Inquisition. He returned to the role of James Vega again for the animated feature film Mass Effect: Paragon Lost, dubbed by FUNimation. From 2014 until 2018, he was the voice of Kanan Jarrus, one of the last surviving Jedi Knights, on the Disney XD series Star Wars Rebels. He reprised the role for the opening scene of the pilot episode of the Disney+ series The Bad Batch in May 2021. In March 2023, he launched a new podcast, That Was Pretty Scary, with co-host Jon Lee Brody.

=== Professional wrestling ===
==== Work with WWE (2008–2009, 2010–2012) ====
Prinze is a WWE fan and was seen on television in attendance at the March 2008 WrestleMania XXIV pay-per-view and its preceding Hall of Fame ceremony. He also made a cameo on an episode of The Dirt Sheet, an online program hosted by wrestlers John Morrison and The Miz. He had created an official profile on WWE's "Universe" blog community where he would regularly write his thoughts about the current goings-on in the world of the WWE. His relationship with the company was furthered when he was hired as a member of the creative staff to contribute to weekly television and pay-per-view programming for the SmackDown brand. It was reported on February 22, 2009, that Prinze and WWE had parted ways, but in January 2021, Prinze explained that he had actually chosen to leave the company at that time.

On August 17, 2009, Prinze appeared on Raw as a special guest host, where he was assaulted by then WWE Champion Randy Orton after refusing to bail Orton out of his tag team match with John Cena, who was due to challenge him in the upcoming SummerSlam. Prinze later returned to the program and got his payback during Orton's match with Cena against Big Show and Chris Jericho, by setting up a lumberjack match involving Mark Henry, Primo, Evan Bourne, Kofi Kingston, MVP, and Jamie Noble.

Prinze returned to WWE on October 1, 2010, in a role as a producer and director. On the November 1, 2010 episode of Monday Night Raw, Prinze made an on-screen appearance as Vince McMahon's doctor, a dream sequence scene that coincided with Linda McMahon's attempt to win a seat in the Senate for the state of Connecticut. Prinze left WWE for a second time due to a comment made by Stone Cold Steve Austin to a contestant while taping an episode of the fifth season of WWE Tough Enough.

==== Podcast (since 2021) ====
In November 2021, Prinze started his own podcast Wrestling With Freddie with cohost Jeff Dye.

=== Premier Streaming Network ===
In April 2023, Freddie Prinze Jr. joined the ownership team of Premier Streaming Network, a streaming platform focused on wrestling, sports, and entertainment content.

=== MyFandom Sports App ===
In June 2024, Freddie Prinze Jr. was announced as part of the ownership team behind MyFandom, an iOS app co-founded by brothers Fred and Josh Shernoff. MyFandom allows sports fans to contribute personal media to a collective archive of sporting events, creating a user-generated historical record while enabling individuals to curate their own attendance history.

== Personal life ==
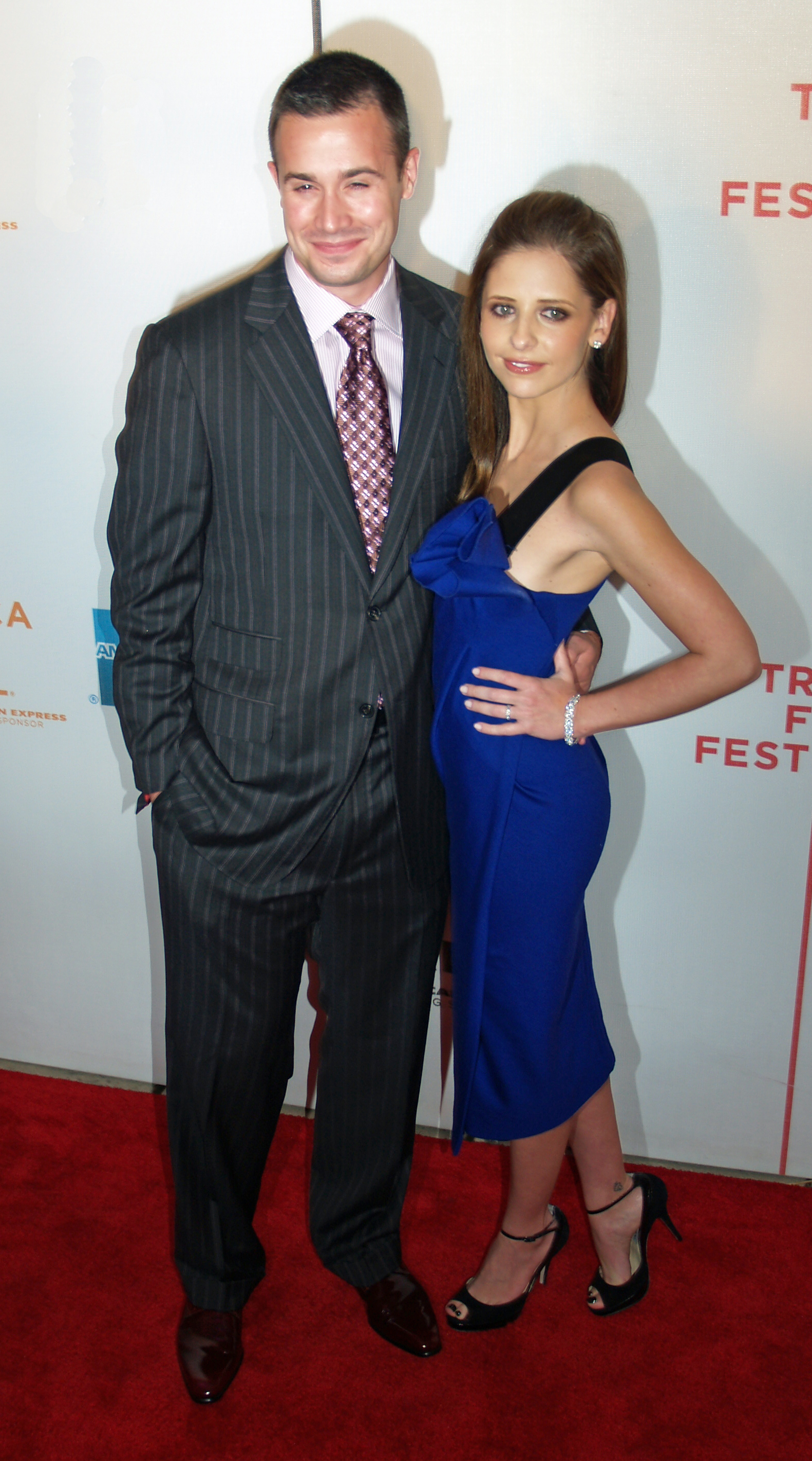
Prinze Jr. with his wife Sarah Michelle Gellar at the 2007 Tribeca Film Festival

Prinze dated actress Kimberly McCullough from 1996 until 1999. He married actress Sarah Michelle Gellar on September 1, 2002, in Puerto Vallarta, Jalisco, Mexico. The couple met several years before, while filming I Know What You Did Last Summer (1997), started dating in 2000 and were engaged in April 2001. They co-starred in Scooby-Doo (2002), Scooby-Doo 2: Monsters Unleashed (2004), Happily N'Ever After (2006), Star Wars Rebels (2014–2018), and the 2025 sequel to I Know What You Did Last Summer that bore the same title. Gellar made a non-speaking cameo in Prinze's film She's All That (1999). They have two children together.

Prinze is an avid practitioner of Brazilian jiu-jitsu and has reached the rank of purple belt in the sport, having been promoted under Jean Jacques Machado.

== Filmography ==
=== Film ===
Year	Title	Role	Notes	Ref.
1996	To Gillian on Her 37th Birthday	Joey Bost		
1997	The House of Yes	Anthony Pascal		
1997	Sparkler	Brad		
1997	I Know What You Did Last Summer	Ray Bronson		
1998	I Still Know What You Did Last Summer	Ray Bronson		
1999	She's All That	Zachary "Zack" Siler		
1999	Wing Commander	Lt. Christopher Blair		
2000	Down to You	Alfred "Al" Connelly		
2000	Boys and Girls	Ryan Walker		
2001	Head over Heels	Jim Winston/Bob Smoot		
2001	Summer Catch	Ryan Dunne		
2002	Scooby-Doo	Fred Jones		
2004	Scooby-Doo 2: Monsters Unleashed	Fred Jones		
2005	Shooting Gallery	Jericho Hudson	Also producer	
2006	Shark Bait	Pisces "Pi" (voice)		
2006	Happily N'Ever After	Rick (voice)		
2007	Brooklyn Rules	Michael Turner		
2007	New York City Serenade	Owen		
2008	Jack and Jill vs. the World	Jack		
2008	Delgo	Delgo (voice)		
2012	Mass Effect: Paragon Lost	Lt. James Vega (voice)		
2015	Misery Loves Comedy	Himself	Documentary	
2019	Star Wars: The Rise of Skywalker	Kanan Jarrus (voice)		
2019	Killer Skin	Masked Killer	Short film	
2022	Clerks III	Auditioner 15		
2022	Christmas with You	Miguel Torres		
2023	Glisten and the Merry Mission	Crumble Starsnaps (voice)		
2024	The Girl in the Pool	Thomas		
2025	I Know What You Did Last Summer	Ray Bronson		

=== Television ===
Year	Title	Role	Notes	Ref.
1995	Family Matters	Tough Guy	Episode: "The Gun"	
1995	The Watcher	Billy	Episode: "The Human Condition: The Blood of Our Children/Rita/The Comic"	
1996	ABC Afterschool Special	Jeff	Episode: "Too Soon for Jeff"	
1997	Detention: The Siege at Johnson High	Aaron Sullivan	Television film	
1998	Vig	Tony	Television film	
2000	Saturday Night Live	Himself	Host; Episode: "Freddie Prinze Jr./Macy Gray"	
2000	Brak Presents the Brak Show Starring Brak	Himself	Episode #1.1	
2002	Frasier	Mike (voice)	Episode: "Juvenilia"	
2002	Friends	Sandy	Episode: "The One with the Male Nanny"	
2003	Kim Possible: A Sitch In Time	Future Jim / Future Tim (voice)	Television film	
2004–2006	Boston Legal	Donny Crane	3 episodes	
2005–2006	Freddie	Freddie Moreno	Main role; 22 episodes Also co-creator and executive producer	
2006	George Lopez	Freddie Moreno	Episode: "George Gets Cross Over Freddie"	
2007	Atlanta	Eric	Television film	
2008–2009	WWE SmackDown	—N/a	Writer; 26 episodes	
2009	No Heroics	Bradley (aka Infinitum)	Unaired pilot	
2010	24	Cole Ortiz	24 episodes	
2010	Psych	Dennis	Episode: "Not Even Close... Encounters"	
2012	Happy Valley	Noah	Unaired pilot	
2005–2022	Robot Chicken	Fred Jones / Various (voice)	7 episodes	
2013	Witches of East End	Leo Wingate	2 episodes	
2013–2014	Bones	Danny Beck	2 episodes	
2014–2018	Star Wars Rebels	Kanan Jarrus (voice)	70 episodes	
2016	Bordertown	Tut (voice)	Episode: "The Engagement"	
2016	First Impressions	Himself	Host; 6 episodes	
2016–2017	Movie Trivia Schmoedown	Himself	Commentator; 4 episodes	
2019–2020	GEGG WARS	Pash / O'rak Adalani	6 episodes	
2021	Star Wars: The Bad Batch	Caleb Dume (voice)	Episode: "Aftermath"	
2021	Punky Brewster	Travis	10 episodes	
2022–2024	WWE Rivals	Himself	Host; 16 episodes	
2025	Robot Chicken: Self Discovery Special	Fred Jones (voice)	Television Special	

=== Video games ===
Year	Title	Voice role	Ref.
2012	Mass Effect 3	Lt. James Vega	
2014	Dragon Age: Inquisition	The Iron Bull	
2015	Disney Infinity 3.0	Kanan Jarrus	
2015	Star Wars Rebels: Recon Missions	Kanan Jarrus	
2021	Mass Effect Legendary Edition	Lt. James Vega	

=== Music videos ===
Year	Title	Artist(s)	Role	Notes	Ref.
1997	"Kid"	Green Apple Quick Step	Ray Bronson		
1999	"Kiss Me" (She's All That version)	Sixpence None the Richer	Himself / Zachary "Zack" Siler	Archival footage	
2004	"Don't Wanna Think About You"	Simple Plan	Fred Jones	Cameo	

=== Podcasts ===
Year	Title	Role	Notes	Ref.
2017–2021	Prinze and The Wolf	Himself	Co-Host with Josh Wolf	
2021–present	Wrestling with Freddie	Himself	Host, executive producer	
2023–present	That Was Pretty Scary	Himself	Host, executive producer	

== Awards and nominations ==
Year	Award	Category	Work	Result	Ref.
1996	Golden Globe Awards	Mr. Golden Globe (shared with Jaime Nicole Dudney as Miss Golden Globe)	—N/a	Won	
1998	ALMA Award	Outstanding Actor in a Feature Film	I Know What You Did Last Summer	Nominated	
1998	Young Artist Awards	Best Performance in a Feature Film – Supporting Young Actor	I Know What You Did Last Summer	Nominated	
1998	Young Artist Awards	Best Performance in a TV Movie or Feature Film – Young Ensemble (shared with the cast)	I Know What You Did Last Summer	Nominated	
1998	Blockbuster Entertainment Awards	Favorite Actor – Horror	I Know What You Did Last Summer	Nominated	
1999	Blockbuster Entertainment Awards	Favorite Supporting Actor – Horror	I Still Know What You Did Last Summer	Won	
1999	Teen Choice Awards	Choice Movie: Actor	She's All That	Won	
1999	ALMA Award	Outstanding Actor in a Feature Film in a Crossover Role	I Still Know What You Did Last Summer	Nominated	
1999	Teen Choice Awards	Sexiest Love Scene (shared with Rachael Leigh Cook)	She's All That	Won	
1999	MTV Movie Awards	Best On-Screen Duo (shared with Rachael Leigh Cook)	She's All That	Nominated	
1999	Teen Choice Awards	Choice Movie: Actor	Down to You	Won	
1999	Teen Choice Awards	Choice Chemistry (shared with Julia Stiles)	Down to You	Nominated	
1999	Bravo Otto	Best Actor	—N/a	Nominated	
2000	Bravo Otto	Best Actor	—N/a	Nominated	
2000	ALMA Award	Outstanding Actor in a Feature Film	She's All That	Nominated	
2000	Blockbuster Entertainment Awards	Favorite Actor – Comedy/Romance	She's All That	Nominated	
2000	Imagen Awards	Best Actor – Feature Film	She's All That	Nominated	
2000	Kids' Choice Awards	Favorite Movie Couple (shared with Rachael Leigh Cook)	She's All That	Won	
2001	Teen Choice Awards	Choice Male Hottie	—N/a	Nominated	
2002	Teen Choice Awards	Choice Movie: Comedy Actor	Scooby-Doo	Nominated	
2002	Teen Choice Awards	Choice Chemistry (shared with Sarah Michelle Gellar)	Scooby-Doo	Nominated	
2002	Golden Raspberry Awards	Worst Supporting Actor	Scooby-Doo	Nominated	
2013	Behind the Voice Actors Awards	Best Vocal Ensemble in a Video Game (People's Choice) (shared with the cast)	Mass Effect 3	Won	
2013	Behind the Voice Actors Awards	Best Vocal Ensemble in a Video Game (shared with the cast)	Mass Effect 3	Nominated	
2015	Behind the Voice Actors Awards	Best Vocal Ensemble in a Video Game (shared with the cast)	Dragon Age: Inquisition	Won	
2015	Behind the Voice Actors Awards	Best Vocal Ensemble in a New Television Series (shared with the cast)	Star Wars Rebels	Nominated	
2015	Golden Joystick Awards	Best Performer	Dragon Age: Inquisition	Nominated	
2018	Behind the Voice Actors Awards	Best Vocal Ensemble in a Television Series (shared with the cast)	Star Wars Rebels	Nominated	

== See also ==
- List of Puerto Ricans
