= James Vega =

Fictional character in the Mass Effect video game series

- Mass Effect character
- Concept art of James Vega published in the The Art of the Mass Effect Universe (2012)
- First appearance: Mass Effect: Conviction (2011)
- First game: Mass Effect 3 (2012)
- Voiced by: Freddie Prinze Jr.

In-universe information
- Origin: California, United North American States, Earth
- Class: Alliance Soldier
- Skill: Combat

James Vega is a fictional character in BioWare's Mass Effect media franchise, who is a party member (or "squadmate") in the third game of the series. Within the series, he is a human Systems Alliance Marine holding the rank of lieutenant, and first appears in Mass Effect: Conviction where he is assigned by Systems Alliance Admiral David Anderson to escort series protagonist Commander Shepard, who is en route to an Alliance defense committee hearing in Vancouver. After the Reapers invasion of Earth commences, James joins Shepard and the crew of the Normandy as they depart Earth to rally support from humanity's allies. The character has also appeared in other media, including the first issue of the comic mini-series Mass Effect: Homeworlds, and anime film Mass Effect: Paragon Lost. James Vega is voiced by American actor Freddie Prinze, Jr.

James Vega has received an overall mixed reception. Initial fan reaction to his reveal was noted to be divisive, while critical and fan reception towards the character following the release of Mass Effect 3 had improved.

== Creation and conception ==
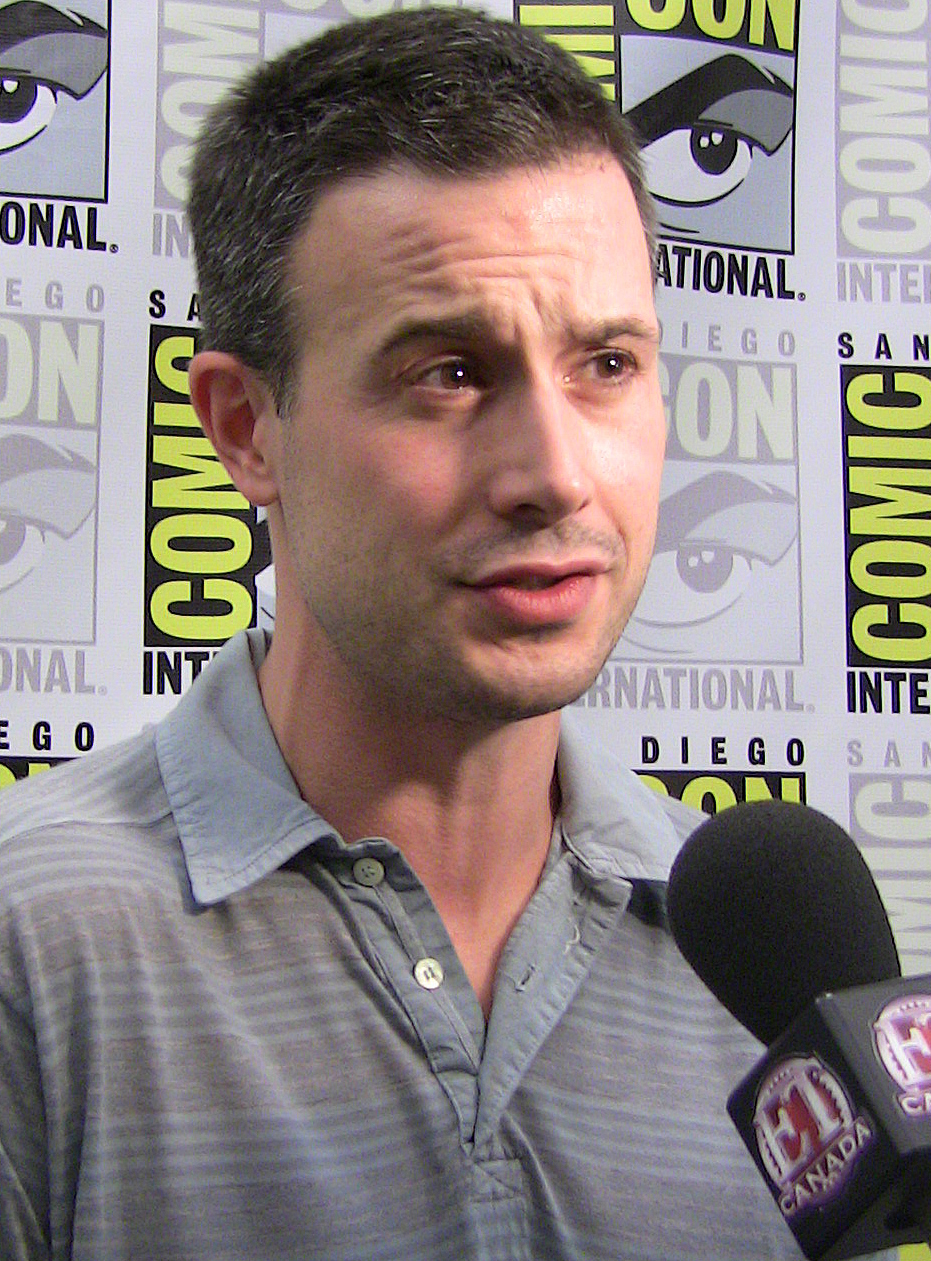
Freddie Prinze Jr. voices James Vega for all media

James Vega was first unveiled as "James Sanders" in Issue 217 of Game Informer, published in May 2011. The basic concept behind the character is a blue collar military officer who happens to be "a heavily muscled tank of a man"; his armor is given a lot of heft to imply that he is "an unstoppable force". His rugged look with tattoos, scars and a goatee help distinguish him from the clean-cut Alliance characters. He is meant to represent the perspective of a new player to the Mass Effect series. James is described as a capable soldier, though "unacclimated to the delicate and often deadly inner-workings of galactic politics". To celebrate his Twitter account reaching its 10,000th follower in July 2011, Executive Producer of the Mass Effect series Casey Hudson directed fans to the official Mass Effect 3 Twitter account where a promotional image of James, who by then was redesigned and renamed, had been uploaded and published. Hudson explained that the Sanders name was used while the character was still in the process of being designed by his team. Preston Watamaniuk, lead designer of the Mass Effect series, suggested that James is concepted as a "defensive soldier who focuses on survivability rather than fire power" in combat situations.

Freddie Prinze Jr. described James as a no-nonsense marine, and he derived some of his inspiration for the character from an actual army captain. He described how soldiers like James often have to put their feelings aside as a coping mechanism and deal with it after the fact, as they get bombarded with a lot of visual and physical information during intense life and death situations. Prinze said that there would be a few instances in the game where the player gets the opportunity to see how these kind of situations affect James, more so than other characters. He noted that BioWare's approach to creating a character driven game keeps players invested in wanting to know what their motivation is instead of how they would react to given a situation, and emphasized that each companion character is "active" as opposed to "reactive". Robyn Théberge, who was the associate product manager for the game's audio, visual effects and user interface teams, said some of the dialogue based on Prinze's delivery was adopted into the game, noting his enthusiasm and his competency at selling James' personality.

== Appearances ==
=== Mass Effect 3 ===
James Vega escorts Shepard before an Alliance defense committee during the opening sequence of Mass Effect 3, but the hearing is interrupted when the Reapers attack Earth. James is on board the Alliance-refitted SSV Normandy SR-2 when Shepard is picked up, though he is displeased with Shepard's insistence on leaving Earth in order to gather allies and resources from the other species. He is usually found in the shuttle bay where he maintains the armory with shuttle pilot Steve Cortez, with whom he develops a close friendship, and can occasionally be found in various parts of the Normandy interacting with other crew members. James also has a tendency of assigning nicknames to individuals he interacts with, claiming that some people just do not match their names so he gives them new ones that are easier for him to remember.

Shepard may, at the player's discretion, develop a rapport with James which may develop into a mentor-mentee relationship. For example, if Shepard visits James in the shuttle bay after returning to the Normandy from the Citadel for the first time, Shepard may accept a request to spar with him. James would then describe in detail about his decision to prioritize valuable intel instead of the victims abducted by the Collectors, but found out too late that his choice was rendered completely unnecessary since Shepard managed to eliminate the Collector threat without the intel James saved, which in his view meant that the colony was allowed to die for nothing. As an option, Shepard may advise him to let go of his death wish and move on from his guilt over the Fehl Prime mission, and stay focused on the mission ahead. In another instance, James approaches Shepard for advice about an offer from the Alliance leadership to undergo N7 training, and asks Shepard to be his supervisor for the program.

James appears in a recurring role in the plot of the Mass Effect 3 DLC Leviathan. In one instance, he helps Shepard restrain a victim who is possessed by an ancient, mysterious being known as Leviathan. His last appearance in the Mass Effect media franchise is in the Citadel DLC. If certain conditions are met, a female Shepard may persuade James to have a one night stand with her.

=== In other media ===
Jame's first series appearance is in Mass Effect Conviction, an 8-page mini-comic set after James' disastrous mission on Fehl Prime. While playing cards at bar on Omega station in the Terminus Systems, a broadcast regarding Commander Shepard's actions in Mass Effect 2: Arrival which led to the destruction of the Bahak System's mass relay, causing the deaths of over 300,000 batarian lives in the system. James reacts by tearing the screen off the wall and tells the bartender to pay for the damages with his winnings, but quickly gets into a fight with his batarian playmates who are enraged at Shepard's actions and take umbrage at James. James escapes from the bar and is later contacted by Admiral Anderson, who tells James to get over the incident on Fehl Prime, and reveals that he has assigned James to guard a brig and its sole prisoner, Commander Shepard.

James appears as the protagonist of Issue #1 of the comic mini-series Mass Effect: Homeworlds, set a decade before the events of Mass Effect 3 where Vega is revealed to be the surname of James' maternal relatives. James joins the Systems Alliance Marines at Camp Pendleton after being motivated by his uncle, Emilio Vega. Upon returning home, his father Joshua Sanders asks him to pick up a package in San Diego. After obtaining the package, which are revealed to be the drug "red sand", James is forced to evade the police and returns home to his father, who attempts to blackmail James with information about his involvement and manipulate him into giving up on his military career. Emilio later finds and comforts James, persuading him to enlist with the Alliance regardless of his father's empty threats.

James' time being stationed on the remote colony of Fehl Prime with Delta Squad, an Alliance special forces unit, is depicted in 2012's Mass Effect: Paragon Lost anime film. When the Collectors attack the colony to capture its population, James and his squad were determined to protect the local civilians, though most of his squad mates along with the resident population are killed. The leadership vacuum left by team Captain Toni after he falls in battle is filled in by James, who has to make a choice between either saving the colony or the intel the squad had recovered that could potentially be used to defeat the Collectors. James chooses to secure the intel, to his later regret as depicted in Conviction and Mass Effect 3.

There is an oblique reference found on a data terminal in Mass Effect: Andromeda, which mentions a human actor "Vega Bull Jr." and suggests he should be made an honorary Krogan; the allusion is to Prinze and his Bioware characters Vega and Iron Bull, both of whom are huge, Kroganesque men.

== Reception ==
Prior to the release of Mass Effect 3, media journalists have noticed a highly polarized response from fans to the character's appearance. Brenna Hillier from VG 247 commented that she preferred his look out of armor, but observed that "the TwitPic comment thread suggests fans aren’t digging the newest human team member". Robert Purchese agreed that James has met with a divided opinion, whom he noted as "not the most handsome bloke on the block, nor does he sound to be particularly exotic or exciting". Paul Ryan from GamesRadar said there is plenty of discussion among fans over his appearance, with comments such as "male eye candy" or "the next Jersey Shore cast member". Evan Narcisse from Kotaku noted that besides the Jersey Shore comments, some fans had taken to speculate as to whether James would be the same-sex romance option for a male Commander Shepard. Owen Good also from Kotaku felt that the final design of James unveiled by Hudson In July 2011 looked much better than his original reveal in the May 2011 issue of Game Informer. In response to the passionate yet divisive response, Casey Hudson suggested that characters within the ensemble casts of BioWare's games are "designed to be loved by some players but not all." Lead writer Mac Walters suggested that fans were seeing the character out of context, and noted that they do not normally tout or promote a character before the game comes out.

The character's reception with both critics and fans have improved upon the release of Mass Effect 3, and is overall mixed or average. According to player statistics released by BioWare for Mass Effect 3 in 2013, James Vega was the third most popular squad member, as well as the squad member with the highest survival rate. James has been subject to fan labor-driven activities, such as fan art. Wes Fenlon from PC Gamer said James is "just a normal human dude", though he did find the character to be likeable. Sal Basile from UGO.com praised his combat prowess and said that if the player "can get past his Jersey Shore looks, James could be a powerful ally. Just tell him to knock the "loco" crap off". Conversely, Samuel Roberts, also from PC Gamer, said James is overly grumpy and he does not recall enjoying his company much, "aside from beating him up in the shuttle bay of the Normandy". Lucas Sullivan does not care for the character, and called him as an example of the "Bench Warmer" archetype. James' appearance in the Citadel DLC was praised by Kirk Hamilton from Kotaku for the quality of his banter conversations, while Joe Juba from Game Informer criticized the pull-up minigame with James for taking a long time to complete without a satisfactory payoff.

James has received similarly mixed reviews for his appearances in other media. GameSpot staff criticized the developers as well as publisher Electronic Arts for their handling Mass Effect as a transmedia franchise, and complained about the difficulty of following James' story arc within the context of Mass Effect 3, as too much background information about the character is only available in other media forms, which leads to the game's opening unfolding in a "ham-fisted, blundering way". The first issue of Homeworlds, which fleshes out the character's backstory, received mediocre reviews. Benjamin Bailey from IGN assessed the issue as a "pretty generic story about James and his deadbeat dad who looks like a reject from Point Break", and was left unconvinced that there was more depth to James' character other being a "typical, tattooed, authority-hating, video game tough guy". Conversely, critics have noted in their reviews of Paragon Lost that its depiction of James Vega made the character more interesting. Having previously expressed ambivalence towards the character's appearance in Mass Effect 3, Bamboo Dong from Anime News Network described the decision to make James' past the central focus of the movie' plot to be surprising but effective. Pedro Cortes said he grew to like James by the end of Mass Effect 3 as he found him to be "amusing, charming and quite useful on the battlefield", and that he felt bad for the character after knowing what he went through during the events of Paragon Lost.

A number of sources have commented on Freddie Prinze Jr.'s casting as James Vega. Kyle Hilliard from Game Informer commented that while Prinze may not have been the first choice for most to play a "muscular military dude", he took note of his genuine passion and good understanding of the intellectual property. Heath Hooker from GameZone said he could not help but be reminded of Prinze's role in the Scooby-Doo live action adaptation, though he looked forward to Prinze's take of a soldier character. Following the game's release, Roberts praised Prinze's performance as James, even though he did not particularly like the character he plays. Prinze's performance as James in Paragon Lost has been positively received.
