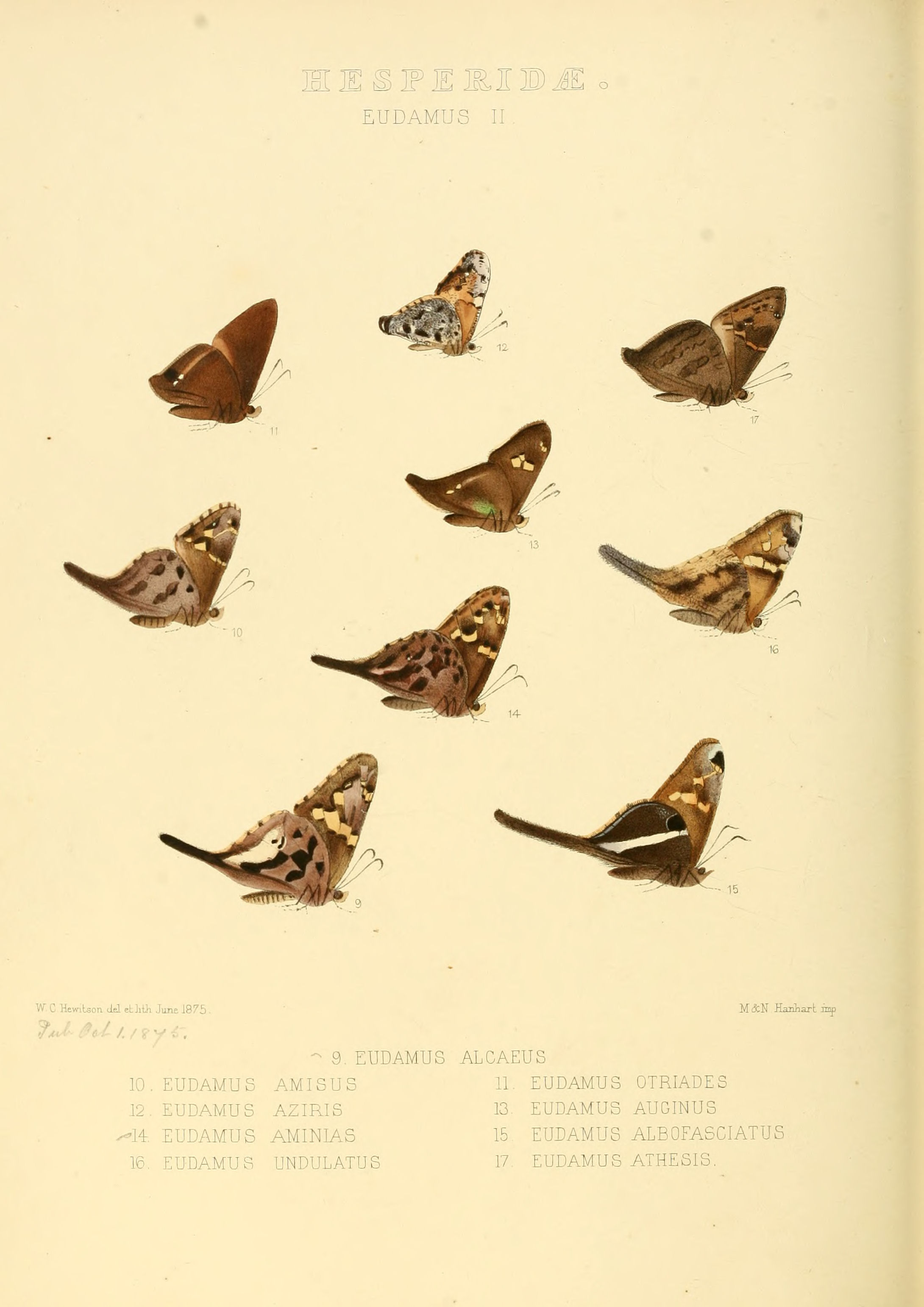
- Thessia athesis (Hewitson, 1867)Fig. 17.

Scientific classification
- Kingdom: Animalia
- Phylum: Arthropoda
- Class: Insecta
- Order: Lepidoptera
- Family: Hesperiidae
- Genus: Thessia; Steinhauser, 1989

= Thessia =

Genus of butterflies

Thessia is a genus in the family Hesperiidae (Eudaminae).

== Species ==
- Thessia athesis (Hewitson, 1867) Venezuela, Colombia, Panama
- Thessia jalapus (Plötz, 1881) Mexico, Belize
