= Drell =

Drell is a surname. Notable people with the surname include:

- Sidney Drell (1926–2016), American theoretical physicist
- Persis Drell, American particle physicist
- Dee D. Drell (born 1947), American judge
- Henri Drell (born 2000), Estonian basketball player

== Other uses ==
- Archie Bell & the Drells (active 1966–1980), an R&B vocal group
- The drell, an alien race from the fictional universe of Mass Effect
  - Thane Krios, a notable member of the drell race
