= List of Hulu exclusive international distribution programming =

These shows are programs that have premiered on different international networks where Hulu and the aforementioned content hub of Disney+ have exclusive distribution rights to stream them in alternate regions, although Hulu lists them as Hulu Originals.

The list includes exclusive content distributed by Hulu's sister service Star, which was replaced by Hulu in international markets (except Japan) on October 8, 2025. In Japan, the Hulu brand is owned by Nippon Television and is separate from Disney content.

== Current programming ==
=== Drama ===
Title	Genre	Original network/Region	Premiere	Seasons	Length	Exclusive region(s)	Status
High Potential (season 2)	Crime procedural	ABC/United States	October 8, 2025 (Note: These shows had their premieres on Star and became Hulu exclusives while their seasons were airing. The premiere reflects the date of their first episode on Hulu.)	1 season, 18 episodes	42–44 min	Selected territories	Renewed
9-1-1 (season 9)	Procedural drama	ABC/United States	October 10, 2025	1 season, 18 episodes	42–45 min	Selected territories	Season 10 ongoing
9-1-1: Nashville	Procedural drama	ABC/United States	October 10, 2025	1 season, 18 episodes	41–43 min	Selected territories	Seson 2 ongoing
Grey's Anatomy (season 22)	Medical drama	ABC/United States	October 10, 2025	1 season, 18 episodes	42–44 min	Selected territories	Season 23 ongoing
Tracker (season 3)	Action drama	CBS/United States	November 11, 2025 (Note: United Kingdom and Ireland); January 28, 2026 (Note: Australia and New Zealand)	1 season, 22 episodes	42–44 min	Selected territories	Season 4 ongoing
R.J. Decker	Crime drama	ABC/United States	March 3, 2026 (Note: All other territories); July 14, 2026	1 season, 9 episodes	42–45 min	Selected territories	Pending
Will Trent (season 4)	Crime drama	ABC/United States	March 18, 2026; June 3, 2026	1 season, 18 episodes	42–44 min	Selected territories	Renewed
Doc (season 2)	Medical drama	Fox/United States	April 22, 2026	1 season, 22 episodes	43–44 min	Brazil and Latin America	Season 3 ongoing
Criminal Minds (season 19)	Crime drama	Paramount+/United States	May 29, 2026 (Note: Southeast Asia)	1 season, 10 episodes	44–56 min	Selected territories	Renewed

=== Comedy ===
Title	Genre	Original network/Region	Premiere	Seasons	Length	Exclusive region(s)	Status
Shoresy	Sports comedy	Crave/Canada	May 27, 2022	5 seasons, 30 episodes	21–33 min	United States	Renewed
Am I Being Unreasonable?	Comedy thriller	BBC Three/United Kingdom	April 11, 2023	2 seasons, 12 episodes	28–29 min	United States	Renewed for final season
Such Brave Girls	Dark comedy	BBC Three/United Kingdom	December 15, 2023	2 seasons, 12 episodes	24–27 min	United States	Renewed
Shifting Gears (season 2)	Sitcom	ABC/United States	October 8, 2025; July 8, 2026	1 season, 13 episodes	22 min	Selected territories	Renewed
Abbott Elementary (season 5)	Mockumentary sitcom	ABC/United States	October 9, 2025; January 7, 2026	1 season, 22 episodes	21–22 min	Selected territories	Renewed
Scrubs	Medical sitcom	ABC/United States	February 26, 2026	1 season, 9 episodes	22 min	Selected territories	Season 2 ongoing

=== Animation ===
==== Adult animation ====
Title	Genre	Original network/Region	Premiere	Seasons	Runtime	Exclusive region(s)	Status
The Simpsons (season 37)	Sitcom	Fox/United States	October 13, 2025; October 22, 2025	1 season, 15 episodes	21 min	Selected territories	Renewed for seasons 38–40
Bob's Burgers (season 16)	Sitcom	Fox/United States	December 17, 2025	1 season, 15 episodes	21 min	Selected territories	Renewed for seasons 17–19
Family Guy (season 24)	Sitcom	Fox/United States	February 16, 2026; February 25, 2026	1 season, 17 episodes	21 min	Selected territories	Renewed for seasons 25–27
American Dad! (season 22)	Sitcom	Fox/United States (seasons 1–11); TBS/United States (seasons 12–21)	February 23, 2026; March 25, 2026; June 3, 2026	1 season, 13 episodes	21 min	Selected territories	Renewed for seasons 23–25

==== Anime ====
Title	Genre	Original network/Region	Premiere	Seasons	Length	Language	Exclusive region(s)	Status
Tokyo Revengers (season 2) (Note: Previously licensed by Crunchyroll (for the first season)) (Note: On Hulu and Disney+ (except Japan), both the Christmas Showdown (part 1) and the Tenjiku (part 2) arcs are listed together as season 2.)	Fantasy action drama	MBS, TV Tokyo, TVh/Japan (S2); MBS, TBS, CBC, BS-TBS/Japan (Animeism anime block; S3)	January 8, 2023	2 seasons, 39 episodes	24 min	Japanese	All markets (Note: Prior to October 8, 2025, the show was exclusively distributed internationally via Star on Disney+ outside the US.)	Season 3 ongoing
The Fable	Crime comedy thriller	NNS (Nippon TV)/Japan	April 7, 2024	1 season, 25 episodes	23 min	Japanese	All markets	Season 2 due to premiere on January 9, 2027
Mission: Yozakura Family	Spy thriller	JNN (TBS, MBS)/Japan	April 7, 2024	2 seasons, 42 episodes	23 min	Japanese	Selected territories	Season 2 ongoing
Medalist	Coming-of-age sports drama	ANN (TV Asahi)/Japan	January 5, 2025	2 seasons, 22 episodes	23 min	Japanese	All markets	Pending
Cat's Eye	Action crime drama	Disney+ (Star Hub)/Japan	September 26, 2025 (Note: United States); October 10, 2025	1 season, 12 episodes	23 min	Japanese	All markets	Pending
Wandance	Coming-of-age musical drama	ANN (TV Asahi), AT-X, BS Asahi/Japan	October 8, 2025	1 season, 10 episodes	23 min	Japanese	All markets	Pending
Bleach: Thousand-Year Blood War (season 4)	Supernatural action-adventure	TXN (TV Tokyo)/Japan	July 25, 2026	1 season, 12 episodes	24 min	Japanese	Selected territories	Season 4 ongoing

=== Reality ===
Title	Genre	Original network/Region	Premiere	Seasons	Length	Exclusive region(s)	Status
Million Dollar Nannies	Reality	Freeform/United States	June 18, 2026 (Note: Canada); June 24, 2026 (Note: Brazil) (Note: Latin America)	1 season, 8 episodes	40–57 min	Selected territories	Pending
Project Runway (season 22)	Fashion competition	Freeform/United States	July 10, 2026	1 season, 8 episodes	42–61 min	Selected territories	Pending
Dancing with the Stars: The Next Pro	Dance competition	ABC/United States	July 14, 2026	1 season, 7 episodes	43 min	Selected territories	Pending
House of Stassi	Reality	Freeform/United States	July 30, 2026; August 12, 2026	1 season, 8 episodes	42–46 min	Selected territories	Pending

=== Non-English language ===
==== Japanese ====
Title	Genre	Original network	Premiere	Seasons	Length	Exclusive region(s)	Status
The Flowers of Evil	Coming-of-age psychological drama	TXN (TV Tokyo)/Japan	April 9, 2026	1 season, 12 episodes	25 min	Selected territories	Pending
Travis Japan Summer Vacation!! in the USA	Travel docuseries	Disney+/Japan	May 1, 2026	1 season, 10 episodes	38–60 min	United States	Pending
King & Prince: Our Meet-Up in LA	Travel docuseries	Disney+/Japan	June 17, 2026	1 season, 9 episodes	24–25 min	United States	Pending
The One Shot	Comedy reality competition	Disney+ (Star Hub)/Japan	August 12, 2026	1 season, 8 episodes	48–55 min	Selected territories	Pending
Red Light Elegy	Romantic comedy	TXN (TV Tokyo)/Japan	October 8, 2026	1 season, 10 episodes	25 min	Selected territories	Season 1 ongoing

==== Korean ====
Title	Genre	Original network	Premiere	Seasons	Length	Exclusive region(s)	Status
Flex X Cop	Crime drama	SBS TV/South Korea	January 26, 2024	2 seasons, 30 episodes	57–70 min	Selected territories	Pending
The Judge from Hell	Dark fantasy legal thriller	SBS TV/South Korea	September 25, 2024	1 season, 14 episodes	60–74 min	Selected territories	Renewed
I Am Boxer	Sports/Variety show	tvN/South Korea	November 21, 2025; November 24, 2025	1 season, 9 episodes	73–91 min	Selected territories	Renewed
The Perfect Lie	Psychological thriller	MBC/South Korea	October 30, 2026	12 episodes	64–66 min	Selected territories	Miniseries ongoing

==== Other ====
Title	Genre	Original network	Premiere	Seasons	Length	Language	Exclusive region(s)	Status
Merry Berry Love	Romantic comedy	Nippon TV/Japan	October 7, 2026	1 season, 10 episodes	45–47 min	Japanese; Korean	All markets	Season 1 ongoing

== Upcoming programming ==
=== Drama ===
Title	Genre	Original network/Region	Premiere	Seasons	Length	Exclusive region(s)	Status
The Day of the Jackal (season 2)	Political thriller	Peacock/United States; Sky Atlantic/United Kingdom	TBA	TBA	49–56 min	Brazil and Latin America	Post-production

=== Non-English language ===
Title	Genre	Original network/Region	Premiere	Seasons	Runtime	Language	Exclusive region(s)	Status
Night Tales Club	Horror anthology	Disney+ (Star Hub)/Japan	January 2027	1 season, 6 episodes	TBA	Japanese	All markets	Pending
Death Stranding Isolations	Science fiction adventure anime	Disney+ (Star Hub)/Japan	2027	TBA	TBA	Japanese	All markets	Pending

== Ended programming ==
=== Drama ===
Title	Genre	Original network	Premiere	Seasons	Length	Exclusive region(s)	Notes
National Treasure	Drama	Channel 4/United Kingdom	March 1, 2017	4 episodes	47–48 min	United States	(Note: Miniseries)
National Treasure: Kiri	Drama	Channel 4/United Kingdom	April 4, 2018	4 episodes	46–47 min	United States	
Find Me in Paris	Teen drama	ZDF/France & Germany	July 20, 2018	3 seasons, 78 episodes	24–27 min	United States	
Safe Harbour	Drama	SBS/Australia	August 24, 2018	1 season, 4 episodes	49–57 min	United States	
The Clearing	Psychological thriller	Disney+ (Star Hub)/Australia	May 24, 2023	8 episodes	45–52 min	United States (Note: Prior to October 8, 2025, the show was a Star Original on Disney+ outside the US.)	
Faraway Downs	Historical drama	Disney+ (Star Hub)/Australia	November 26, 2023	6 episodes	24–49 min	United States	
The Artful Dodger	Period heist drama	Disney+ (Star Hub)/Australia	November 29, 2023	1 season, 8 episodes	41–49 min	United States	(Note: Any future episodes will be released as Hulu Originals.)
Culprits	Heist thriller/Dark comedy	Disney+ (Star Hub)/United Kingdom	December 8, 2023	1 season, 8 episodes	48–57 min	United States	
Shardlake	Historical drama	Disney+ (Star Hub)/United Kingdom	May 1, 2024	1 season, 4 episodes	45–54 min	United States	
The Killing Kind	Crime thriller	Paramount+/United Kingdom	May 14, 2024	6 episodes	45–49 min	United States	
Last Days of the Space Age	Historical drama	Disney+ (Star Hub)/Australia	October 2, 2024	8 episodes	32–46 min	United States	
Rivals	Historical drama	Disney+ (Star Hub)/United Kingdom	October 18, 2024	1 season, 8 episodes	48–61 min	United States	
A Thousand Blows	Historical sports drama	Disney+ (Star Hub)/United Kingdom	February 21, 2025	1 season, 6 episodes	47–55 min	United States	
Suspect: The Shooting of Jean Charles de Menezes	True crime drama	Disney+ (Star Hub)/United Kingdom	April 30, 2025	4 episodes	41–59 min	United States	
Godfather of Harlem (season 4)	Crime drama	MGM+ (Note: Epix for the first two seasons)/United States	April 13, 2026	1 season, 10 episodes	48–60 min	Brazil and Latin America	

=== Comedy ===
Title	Genre	Original network	Premiere	Seasons	Length	Exclusive region(s)	Notes
Moone Boy	Comedy	Sky One/United Kingdom	July 10, 2013	3 seasons, 18 episodes	21–28 min	United States	
Letterkenny	Comedy	Crave/Canada	July 13, 2018	12 seasons, 81 episodes	19–30 min	United States	
Wedding Season	Romantic comedy thriller	Disney+ (Star Hub)	September 8, 2022	1 season, 8 episodes	30–41 min	United States	
Extraordinary	Superhero comedy	Disney+ (Star Hub)/United Kingdom	January 25, 2023	2 seasons, 16 episodes	27–32 min	United States	
The Lowdown	Crime comedy drama	FX/United States	October 8, 2025; November 26, 2025	1 season, 8 episodes	40–59 min	All markets except Canada	(Note: Additional seasons premiered concurrently on FX and Hulu worldwide.)
English Teacher (season 2)	Sitcom	FX/United States	December 3, 2025	1 season, 10 episodes	21–24 min	Brazil and Latin America	

=== Animation ===
==== Adult animation ====
Title	Genre	Original network	Premiere	Seasons	Length	Language	Exclusive region(s)	Notes
Littlekenny	Adult animation shorts	Crave/Canada	December 27, 2019	1 season, 6 episodes	2–3 min	English	United States	

==== Anime ====
Title	Genre	Original network	Premiere	Seasons	Length	Language	Exclusive region(s)	Notes
Black Rock Shooter: Dawn Fall	Action science fantasy	Tokyo MX, BS11, KBS Kyoto, SUN/Japan	October 19, 2022	12 episodes	23 min	Japanese	United States	
The Tatami Time Machine Blues	Mystery/Romantic comedy	Disney+ (Star Hub)/Japan	November 9, 2022	6 episodes	17–32 min	Japanese	United States	
Summer Time Rendering	Supernatural mystery	Tokyo MX, BS11, Kansai TV/Japan	January 11, 2023	25 episodes	23–25 min	Japanese	United States	
Tengoku Daimakyo (a.k.a. Heavenly Delusion)	Science fiction mystery adventure	Tokyo MX, BS11/Japan	April 1, 2023	1 season, 13 episodes	23 min	Japanese	United States	
Synduality: Noir	Science fiction action-adventure	TXN (TV Tokyo), BS Nittele/Japan	July 10, 2023	1 season, 23 episodes	24 min	Japanese	United States	
Phoenix: Eden17	Science fiction fantasy drama	Disney+ (Star Hub)/Japan	September 13, 2023	4 episodes	18–29 min	Japanese	United States	
Undead Unluck	Supernatural action-adventure comedy	JNN (TBS, MBS)/Japan	October 6, 2023	1 season, 24 episodes	24 min	Japanese	United States	
Ishura	Fantasy action-adventure	Tokyo MX, BS Nittele, KBS Kyoto, SUN/Japan	January 3, 2024	2 seasons, 24 episodes	23 min	Japanese	United States	
Sand Land: The Series	Science fiction adventure comedy	Disney+ (Star Hub)/Japan	March 20, 2024	1 season, 13 episodes	24 min	Japanese	United States	
Code Geass: Rozé of the Recapture	Mecha military/Science fantasy	Disney+ (Star Hub)/Japan	June 21, 2024	12 episodes	24 min	Japanese	United States	
Bullet/Bullet	Fantasy action	Disney+ (Star Hub)/Japan	July 16, 2025	12 episodes	25 min	Japanese	United States	
Murai in Love	Romantic comedy	Tokyo MX, BS Nittele, BBC Biwako/Japan	September 4, 2024	1 season, 12 episodes	23 min	Japanese	United States	
Go! Go! Loser Ranger!	Tokusatsu black comedy	JNN (TBS), BS11, AT-X/Japan	April 7, 2024	2 seasons, 24 episodes	23 min	Japanese	All markets	

=== Unscripted ===
==== Docuseries ====
Title	Subject	Original network	Premiere	Seasons	Length	Exclusive region(s)	Notes
Fearless: The Inside Story of the AFLW	Sports	Disney+/Australia	August 24, 2022	6 episodes	45–52 min	United States	(Note: These shows were once available as Hulu Originals, but have been since removed from the service.)
Coleen Rooney: The Real Wagatha Story	Scandal	Disney+ (Star Hub)/United Kingdom	October 18, 2023	3 episodes	45–49 min	United States	
Brawn: The Impossible Formula 1 Story	Sports	Disney+ (Star Hub)/United Kingdom	November 15, 2023	4 episodes	57–61 min	United States	
Camden	Music	Disney+ (Star Hub)/United Kingdom	May 29, 2024	4 episodes	43–52 min	United States	
In Vogue: The 1990s	Fashion/Publishing	Disney+ (Star Hub)/United Kingdom	September 13, 2024	6 episodes	43–50 min	United States	
Sneaker Wars: Adidas v Puma	Fashion industry	Disney+ (Star Hub)/United Kingdom	September 24, 2025	3 episodes	41–42 min	United States	
Scam Goddess	True crime	Freeform/United States	October 15, 2025	1 season, 6 episodes	42 min	Selected territories	
Dirty Talk: When Daytime Talk Shows Ruled TV	Television industry	ABC/United States	February 25, 2026	3 episodes	42 min	Latin America	

=== Non-English language ===
==== Dutch ====
Title	Genre	Original network	Premiere	Seasons	Length	Exclusive region(s)	Notes
That One Word – Feyenoord	Sports docuseries	Disney+ (Star Hub)/Netherlands	September 1, 2021	1 season, 9 episodes	51–66 min	United States	
Nemesis	Crime thriller	Disney+ (Star Hub)/Netherlands	October 16, 2024	8 episodes	40–55 min	United States	

==== French ====
Title	Genre	Original network	Premiere	Seasons	Length	Exclusive region(s)	Notes
Oussekine	Drama	Disney+ (Star Hub)/France	May 25, 2022	4 episodes	53–63 min	United States	
Irresistible	Romantic comedy	Disney+ (Star Hub)/France	September 20, 2023	6 episodes	25–24 min	United States	
Everything Is Fine	Comedy drama	Disney+ (Star Hub)/France	February 28, 2023	8 episodes	52 min	United States	
Becoming Karl Lagerfeld	Biopic	Disney+ (Star Hub)/France	June 7, 2024	6 episodes	38–49 min	United States	
The Disappearance of Kimmy Diore	Drama thriller	Disney+ (Star Hub)/France	October 23, 2024	6 episodes	33–46 min	United States	
Bref (season 2)	Comedy	Disney+ (Star Hub)/France	March 26, 2025	1 season, 6 episodes	31–40 min	United States	

==== German ====
Title	Genre	Original network	Premiere	Seasons	Length	Exclusive region(s)	Notes
Sam: A Saxon	Biographical drama	Disney+ (Star Hub)/Germany	April 26, 2023	7 episodes	43–61 min	United States	
Farm Rebellion	Agriculture/Environmentalism docuseries	Disney+ (Star Hub)/Germany	June 14, 2023	6 episodes	46–51 min	United States	
The Interpreter of Silence	Historical drama	Disney+ (Star Hub)/Germany	November 15, 2023	5 episodes	56–63 min	United States	
Pauline	Supernatural coming-of-age drama	Disney+ (Star Hub)/Germany	May 22, 2024	6 episodes	37–43 min	United States	
Call My Agent Berlin	Comedy drama	Disney+ (Star Hub)/Germany	September 12, 2025	1 season, 10 episodes	39–47 min	United States	

==== Indonesian ====
Title	Genre	Original network	Premiere	Seasons	Length	Exclusive region(s)	Notes
Virgin: The Series	Teen drama	Disney+ Hotstar/Indonesia	March 1, 2023	10 episodes	46–57 min	United States	
Wedding Agreement: The Series	Romantic drama	Disney+ Hotstar/Indonesia	March 15, 2023	2 seasons, 20 episodes	40–69 min	United States	
Susah Sinyal: The Series	Comedy drama	Disney+ Hotstar/Indonesia	April 5, 2023	12 episodes	36–45 min	United States	
Blood Curse	Horror drama	Disney+ Hotstar/Indonesia	June 7, 2023	9 episodes	41–49 min	United States	
Keluarga Cemara: The Series	Coming-of-age drama	Disney+ Hotstar/Indonesia	August 9, 2023	8 episodes	43–47 min	United States	

==== Italian ====
Title	Genre	Original network	Premiere	Seasons	Length	Exclusive region(s)	Notes
The Ignorant Angels	Romantic drama	Disney+ (Star Hub)/Italy	May 11, 2022	8 episodes	41–60 min	United States	
Boris (season 4)	Comedy	Disney+ (Star Hub)/Italy	October 26, 2022	1 season, 8 episodes	29–36 min	United States	
The Good Mothers	Crime drama	Disney+ (Star Hub)/Italy	April 5, 2023	6 episodes	56–60 min	United States	
The Lions of Sicily	Historical drama	Disney+ (Star Hub)/Italy	October 25, 2023	8 episodes	52–58 min	United States	
Raffa	Biography docuseries	Disney+ (Star Hub)/Italy	December 27, 2023	3 episodes	57–62 min	United States	

==== Japanese ====
Title	Genre	Original network	Premiere	Seasons	Length	Exclusive region(s)	Notes
Tomorrow, I'll Be Someone's Girlfriend	Romantic drama	JNN (MBS/TBS)/Japan	December 13, 2022	2 seasons, 21 episodes	24 min	United States	
Because We Forget Everything	Mystery comedy drama	Disney+ (Star Hub)/Japan	December 14, 2022	10 episodes	26–37 min	United States	
Gannibal	Horror thriller	Disney+ (Star Hub)/Japan	December 28, 2022	2 seasons, 15 episodes	33–59 min	United States	
Lost Man Found	Comedy drama	NHK BS Premium; Disney+ (Star Hub)/Japan	January 25, 2023	10 episodes	48 min	United States	
A Town Without Seasons	Light drama	Disney+ (Star Hub)/Japan	August 9, 2023	10 episodes	25–28 min	United States	
My Home Hero	Crime drama	JNN (MBS/TBS)/Japan	October 25, 2023	10 episodes	23–24 min	United States	
Dragons of Wonderhatch	Anime/Live-action hybrid	Disney+ (Star Hub)/Japan	December 20, 2023	8 episodes	33–46 min	United States	
House of the Owl	Political drama	Disney+ (Star Hub)/Japan	April 24, 2024	10 episodes	34–50 min	United States	
Land of Tanabata	Science fiction mystery drama	Disney+ (Star Hub)/Japan	July 4, 2024	10 episodes	44–61 min	United States	

==== Korean ====
Title	Genre	Original network	Premiere	Seasons	Length	Exclusive region(s)	Notes
Outrun by Running Man	Variety show	Disney+ (Star Hub)/South Korea	March 22, 2022	1 season, 14 episodes	32–55 min	United States	
The Zone: Survival Mission	Reality game show	Disney+ (Star Hub)/South Korea	September 8, 2022	3 seasons, 24 episodes	54–73 min	United States	
May It Please the Court	Legal drama	Disney+ (Star Hub)/South Korea	September 21, 2022	12 episodes	57–79 min	United States	
Big Mouth	Fantasy crime drama	MBC/South Korea	September 27, 2022	16 episodes	62–73 min	United States	
Grid	Science fiction crime thriller	Disney+ (Star Hub)/South Korea	October 12, 2022	10 episodes	53–63 min	United States	
Rookie Cops	Coming of age comedy drama	Disney+ (Star Hub)/South Korea	October 12, 2022	16 episodes	53–63 min	United States	
Pink Lie	Dating show	Disney+ (Star Hub)/South Korea	October 26, 2022	1 season, 12 episodes	72–115 min	United States	
Shadow Detective	Crime drama	Disney+ (Star Hub)/South Korea	October 26, 2022	2 seasons, 16 episodes	49–62 min	United States	
Revenge of Others	Coming of age crime drama	Disney+ (Star Hub)/South Korea	November 9, 2022	12 episodes	58–63 min	United States	
Kiss Sixth Sense	Romantic fantasy drama	Disney+ (Star Hub)/South Korea	November 30, 2022	12 episodes	62–73 min	United States	
Connect	Fantasy crime thriller	Disney+ (Star Hub)/South Korea	December 7, 2022	6 episodes	36–46 min	United States	
Big Bet	Crime drama	Disney+ (Star Hub)/South Korea	December 21, 2022	2 seasons, 16 episodes	49–58 min	United States	
Super Junior: The Last Man Standing	Music docuseries	Disney+ (Star Hub)/South Korea	January 18, 2023	2 episodes	49–50 min	United States	
Call It Love	Romantic drama	Disney+ (Star Hub)/South Korea	February 22, 2023	16 episodes	71–73 min	United States	
One Dollar Lawyer	Legal comedy drama	SBS TV/South Korea	March 1, 2023	16 episodes	58–74 min	United States	
Pandora: Beneath the Paradise	Revenge drama	tvN/South Korea	April 12, 2023	16 episodes	62–66 min	United States	
The First Responders	Medical drama	SBS TV/South Korea	April 12, 2023	2 seasons, 24 episodes	59–70 min	United States	
RACE	Workplace drama	Disney+ (Star Hub)/South Korea	May 10, 2023	12 episodes	53–63 min	United States	
Crazy Love	Romantic dark comedy	KBS2/South Korea	May 24, 2023	16 episodes	62–69 min	United States	
Family: The Unbreakable Bond	Spy comedy drama	tvN/South Korea	May 24, 2023	12 episodes	66–79 min	United States	
LINK: Eat, Love, Kill	Romantic fantasy comedy	tvN/South Korea	May 24, 2023	16 episodes	60–72 min	United States	
Full Count	Sports docuseries	Disney+ (Star Hub)/South Korea	June 14, 2023	10 episodes	41–66 min	United States	
Moving	Science fiction action thriller	Disney+ (Star Hub)/South Korea	August 9, 2023	1 season, 20 episodes	38–58 min	United States	
Adamas	Fantasy crime drama	tvN/South Korea	August 30, 2023	16 episodes	65–78 min	United States	
NCT 127: The Lost Boys	Music docuseries	Disney+ (Star Hub)/South Korea	August 30, 2023	4 episodes	34–38 min	United States	
Han River Police	Action comedy	Disney+ (Star Hub)/South Korea	September 13, 2023	6 episodes	47–53 min	United States	
The Worst of Evil	Crime drama	Disney+ (Star Hub)/South Korea	September 27, 2023	12 episodes	52–69 min	United States	
Arthdal Chronicles: The Sword of Aramoon (season 2)	Historical fantasy	tvN/South Korea	November 1, 2023	1 season, 12 episodes	72–78 min	United States	
The Fiery Priest (season 2)	Crime drama	SBS TV/South Korea	November 8, 2024	1 season, 12 episodes	65–88 min	United States	
Vigilante	Action thriller	Disney+ (Star Hub)/South Korea	November 8, 2023	8 episodes	42–54 min	United States	
Maestra: Strings of Truth	Music melodrama	tvN/South Korea	December 9, 2023	16 episodes	45–55 min	United States	
A Shop for Killers	Action drama	Disney+ (Star Hub)/South Korea	January 17, 2024	1 season, 8 episodes	44–62 min	United States	
Tell Me That You Love Me	Romantic drama	Genie TV (ENA)/South Korea	January 24, 2024	16 episodes	60–66 min	United States	
The Impossible Heir	Revenge drama	Disney+ (Star Hub)/South Korea	February 28, 2024	12 episodes	51–65 min	United States	
Blood Free	Mystery thriller	Disney+ (Star Hub)/South Korea	April 10, 2024	10 episodes	46–50 min	United States	
Wonderful World	Mystery revenge drama	MBC TV/South Korea	April 24, 2024	14 episodes	63–73 min	United States	
Crash	Crime comedy	Genie TV (ENA)/South Korea	May 13, 2024	1 season, 12 episodes	60–63 min	Selected territories	(Note: Moved to Rakuten Viki for all other territories from season 2 onward.)
Uncle Samsik	Historical drama	Disney+ (Star Hub)/South Korea	May 15, 2024	16 episodes	44–46 min	United States	
Chief Detective 1958	Period crime action	MBC TV/South Korea	May 22, 2024	10 episodes	65–74 min	United States	
My Name Is Gabriel	Reality show	JTBC/South Korea	June 21, 2024	1 season, 8 episodes	97–118 min	United States	
Red Swan	Revenge drama	Disney+ (Star Hub)/South Korea	July 3, 2024	10 episodes	49–57 min	United States	
No Way Out: The Roulette	Mystery thriller	U+ Mobile TV/South Korea	August 7, 2024	8 episodes	54–61 min	United States	
The Tyrant	Action thriller	Disney+ (Star Hub)/South Korea	August 14, 2024	4 episodes	37–51 min	United States	
Seoul Busters	Crime comedy	Disney+ (Star Hub)/South Korea	September 11, 2024	20 episodes	41–58 min	United States	
Jeongnyeon: The Star Is Born	Coming-of-age period drama	tvN/South Korea	October 12, 2024	16 episodes	61–75 min	United States	
Gangnam B-Side	Crime thriller	Disney+ (Star Hub)/South Korea	November 6, 2024	8 episodes	42–49 min	United States	
Light Shop	Mystery drama	Disney+ (Star Hub)/South Korea	December 4, 2024	8 episodes	39–43 min	United States	
Unmasked	Office humor action thriller	Disney+ (Star Hub)/South Korea	January 15, 2025	12 episodes	65–56 min	United States	
Buried Hearts	Revenge drama	SBS TV/South Korea	February 26, 2025	16 episodes	61–75 min	United States	
Hyper Knife	Medical thriller	Disney+ (Star Hub)/South Korea	March 19, 2025	8 episodes	58–67 min	United States	
Nine Puzzles	Mystery crime thriller	Disney+ (Star Hub)/South Korea	May 21, 2025	11 episodes	50–63 min	United States	
Our Movie	Melodrama	SBS TV/South Korea	June 13, 2025	12 episodes	66–72 min	United States	
Low Life	Period drama	Disney+ (Star Hub)/South Korea	July 16, 2025	11 episodes	54–56 min	United States	
The Nice Guy	Romantic drama	JTBC/South Korea	July 18, 2025	14 episodes	60–62 min	United States	
Twelve	Fantasy action superhero	KBS2/South Korea	August 27, 2025	8 episodes	49–51 min	United States	
Tempest	Political thriller	Disney+ (Star Hub)/South Korea	September 10, 2025	9 episodes	45–76 min	United States	
The Murky Stream	Historical drama	Disney+ (Star Hub)/South Korea	September 26, 2025	9 episodes	47–60 min	United States	(Note: Episodes after October 8, 2025 were released as Hulu Originals.)
Would You Marry Me?	Romantic comedy	SBS TV/South Korea	October 10, 2025	12 episodes	64–72 min	Selected territories	
In Your Radiant Season	Romance drama	MBC TV/South Korea	February 20, 2026	12 episodes	64–71 min	Selected territories	
Perfect Crown	Romantic comedy	MBC TV/South Korea	April 10, 2026	12 episodes	72–73 min	Selected territories	
The Husband	Romantic crime thriller	KBS2/South Korea	July 4, 2026; July 9, 2026 (Note: United States)	12 episodes	60–61 min	Selected territories	
Doctor on the Edge	Romantic light medical drama	ENA/South Korea	June 1, 2026	12 episodes	60–65 min	Selected territories	
Between Steps	Coming-of-age romantic melodrama	ENA/South Korea	October 5, 2026	12 episodes	62–73 min	Selected territories	

==== Mandarin ====
Title	Genre	Original network	Premiere	Seasons	Length	Exclusive region(s)	Notes
Women in Taipei	Romantic melodrama	Disney+ (Star Hub)/Taiwan	September 21, 2022	11 episodes	43–53 min	United States	
Taiwan Crime Stories	Psychological crime thriller	Disney+ (Star Hub)/Taiwan	February 1, 2023	1 season, 12 episodes	44–61 min	United States	

==== Portuguese ====
Title	Genre	Original network	Premiere	Seasons	Length	Exclusive region(s)	Notes
Insanity	Drama	Star+/Brazil	March 14, 2022	1 season, 8 episodes	31–39 min	United States	
O Rei da TV	Biographical drama	Star+/Brazil	October 19, 2022	2 seasons, 16 episodes	34–62 min	United States	
Santo Maldito	Thriller drama	Star+/Brazil	February 8, 2023	1 season, 8 episodes	32–42 min	United States	
Dois Tempos	Comedy drama	Star+/Brazil	May 10, 2023	1 season, 8 episodes	32–39 min	United States	
Impuros (seasons 3–5)	Crime drama	Star+/Brazil (seasons 3–4); Disney+ (Star Hub)/Brazil (season 5)	May 10, 2023	3 seasons, 30 episodes	38–56 min	United States	
A Superfantástica História do Balão	Music docuseries	Star+/Brazil	July 12, 2023	3 episodes	40–59 min	United States	
Compro Likes	Comedy	Star+/Brazil	September 22, 2023	1 season, 5 episodes	28–32 min	United States	
How to Be a Carioca	Comedy	Star+/Brazil	October 18, 2023	6 episodes	28–30 min	United States	
Killer Vacation	Drama thriller	Star+/Brazil	November 8, 2023	1 season, 8 episodes	34–41 min	United States	
A História Delas	Drama	Star+/Brazil	December 6, 2023	1 season, 8 episodes	45–55 min	United States	
Whatever, Whenever	Comedy drama	Star+/Brazil	March 27, 2024	1 season, 6 episodes	29–36 min	United States	
Benefits with Friends	Romantic comedy	Disney+ (Star Hub)/Brazil	February 12, 2025	1 season, 10 episodes	39–40 min	United States	
Maria: The Outlaw Legend	Historical drama	Disney+ (Star Hub)/Brazil	April 4, 2025	1 season, 6 episodes	32–45 min	United States	
Team Players	Comedy drama	Disney+ (Star Hub)/Brazil	July 9, 2025	1 season, 8 episodes	31–39 min	United States	
Capoeiras	Historical crime drama	Disney+ (Star Hub)/Brazil	August 29, 2025	1 season, 6 episodes	34–43 min	United States	

==== Spanish ====
Title	Genre	Original network	Premiere	Seasons	Length	Exclusive region(s)	Notes
It Was Not My Fault: Mexico	Drama	Star+/Mexico	September 17, 2021	1 season, 10 episodes	38–46 min	United States	
Santa Evita	Historical drama	Star+/Argentina	July 26, 2022	7 episodes	39–47 min	United States	
Alternative Therapy	Comedy	Star+/Argentina	March 14, 2022	2 seasons, 17 episodes	31–44 min	United States	
El galán. La TV cambió, él no	Black comedy	Star+/Mexico	June 8, 2022	1 season, 12 episodes	23–38 min	United States	
El repatriado	Drama	Star+/Mexico	September 27, 2022	1 season, 10 episodes	32–44 min	United States	
Limbo	Drama	Star+/Argentina	September 28, 2022	1 season, 10 episodes	32–42 min	United States	
Hache. Lo que no se nombra	News magazine	Star+/Argentina	October 19, 2022	1 season, 7 episodes	25–35 min	United States	
El encargado	Comedy drama	Star+/Argentina (seasons 1–2); Disney+ (Star Hub)/Argentina (season 3)	October 26, 2022	3 seasons, 25 episodes	28–32 min	United States	
Robo mundial	Comedy drama	Star+/Argentina	November 9, 2022	1 season, 6 episodes	25–33 min	United States	
La última	Drama	Disney+ (Star Hub)/Spain	December 2, 2022	5 episodes	47–58 min	United States	
El heredero: La dinastía del freestyle	Reality competition	Star+/Mexico	January 20, 2023	1 season, 20 episodes	32–42 min	United States	
El comandante Fort	Biographical docuseries	Star+/Argentina	January 25, 2023	4 episodes	34–61 min	United States	
Horario estelar	Thriller	Star+/Mexico	February 15, 2023	1 season, 10 episodes	33–44 min	United States	
El grito de las mariposas	Historical drama	Star+/Argentina	March 8, 2023	13 episodes	38–56 min	United States	
Ringo. Gloria y muerte	Biopic	Star+/Argentina	March 24, 2023	7 episodes	30–50 min	United States	
Máscara contra caballero	Comedy	Star+/Mexico	April 19, 2023	1 season, 8 episodes	22–26 min	United States	
Planners	Comedy drama	Star+/Argentina	May 5, 2023	2 seasons, 13 episodes	30–41 min	United States	
La chica invisible	Drama thriller	Disney+ (Star Hub)/Spain	May 16, 2023	8 episodes	31–42 min	United States	
Los protectores	Sports comedy drama	Star+/Argentina	June 25, 2023	2 seasons, 15 episodes	31–45 min	United States	
548 Days: Abducted Online	True crime docuseries	Disney+ (Star Hub)/Spain	June 30, 2023	3 episodes	52–62 min	United States	
El Mantequilla: Maestro de la estafa	True crime drama	Star+/Mexico	September 13, 2023	8 episodes	24–38 min	United States	
Nada	Comedy	Star+/Argentina	October 11, 2023	1 season, 5 episodes	28–25 min	United States	
I'm Your Fan (season 3)	Comedy	Star+/Mexico	November 15, 2023	1 season, 8 episodes	28–30 min	United States	
Coppola, The Agent	Biopic	Star+/Argentina	March 15, 2024	6 episodes	33–45 min	United States	
UFO Factory	Science fiction comedy	Star+/Mexico	April 3, 2024	1 season, 10 episodes	21–27 min	United States	
See You in Another Life	Crime thriller	Disney+ (Star Hub)/Spain	April 17, 2024	6 episodes	32–44 min	United States	
Past Lies	Drama thriller	Disney+ (Star Hub)/Spain	May 10, 2024	6 episodes	49–51 min	United States	
Lucrecia: A Murder in Madrid	True crime docuseries	Disney+ (Star Hub)/Spain	June 27, 2024	4 episodes	32–36 min	United States	
The Chavez	Reality	Disney+ (Star Hub)/Mexico	September 11, 2024	1 season, 6 episodes	28–38 min	United States	
Pedro el escamoso: más escamoso que nunca	Telenovela	Caracol Televisión/Colombia; Disney+ (Star Hub)/Colombia	September 19, 2024	1 season, 23 episodes	44–51 min	United States	
Mama Cake	Comedy	Disney+ (Star Hub)/Mexico	September 25, 2024	1 season, 10 episodes	27–33 min	United States	
Pancho Villa: The Centaur of the North	Period drama	Star+/Mexico	October 14, 2024	10 episodes	38–50 min	United States	
Return to Las Sabinas	Telenovela	Disney+ (Star Hub)/Spain	October 15, 2024	70 episodes	38–55 min	United States	
The Best Heart Attack of My Life	Comedy drama	Disney+ (Star Hub)/Argentina	January 24, 2025	6 episodes	28–38 min	United States	
Between Walls	Romantic comedy	Disney+ (Star Hub)/Mexico	February 12, 2025	1 season, 10 episodes	30–32 min	United States	
Spartans: A True Story	Sports drama	Disney+ (Star Hub)/Argentina	February 19, 2025	1 season, 8 episodes	30–44 min	United States	
Shared Custody	Comedy drama	Disney+ (Star Hub)/Spain	February 28, 2025	8 episodes	28–36 min	United States	
Kun by Agüero	Sports docuseries	Disney+ (Star Hub)/Argentina	May 7, 2025	4 episodes	42–49 min	United States	
Suspicious Minds	Action comedy	Disney+ (Star Hub)/Spain	July 10, 2025	6 episodes	44–47 min	United States	
Breakdown	Crime drama	Disney+ (Star Hub)/Argentina & Mexico	August 15, 2025	1 season, 6 episodes	41–48 min	United States	

==== Turkish ====
Title	Genre	Original network	Premiere	Seasons	Length	Exclusive region(s)	Notes
Ben Gri	Crime thriller	Disney+ (Star Hub)/Turkey	November 16, 2022	1 season 8 episodes	30–41 min	United States	
Between the World and Us	Romantic drama	Disney+ (Star Hub)/Turkey	December 28, 2022	1 season, 8 episodes	49–57 min	United States	
Kaçis: Runaway	Action thriller	Disney+ (Star Hub)/Turkey	January 4, 2023	1 seasons, 8 episodes	39–51 min	United States	
The Actress	Crime thriller	Disney+ (Star Hub)/Turkey	May 31, 2023	1 season, 8 episodes	42–43 min	United States	
Search	Crime thriller	Disney+ (Star Hub)/Turkey	June 14, 2023	1 season, 6 episodes	48–62 min	United States	
Reminder	Romantic comedy	Disney+ (Star Hub)/Turkey	September 3, 2025	8 episodes	39–54 min	United States	

==== Other ====
Title	Genre	Original network	Premiere	Seasons	Length	Language	Exclusive region(s)	Notes
Whiskey on the Rocks	Satire	Disney+ (Star Hub)/Sweden; SVT1/Sweden	January 22, 2025	6 episodes	29–30 min	Swedish	United States	
The Breslau Murders	Historical crime drama	Disney+ (Star Hub)/Poland	September 12, 2025	1 season, 8 episodes	42–49 min	Polish	Selected territories	

== Specials ==
Title	Genre	Original network	Premiere	Runtime	Language
The Pope: Answers	Interview	Disney+ (Star Hub)	April 5, 2023	1 h 22 min	Spanish
PSY Summer Swag 2022	Concert	Disney+ (Star Hub)	May 3, 2023	1 h 26 min	Korean

== Films ==
=== Feature films ===
Title	Genre	Original network	Premiere	Runtime	Language
A Place to Fight For	Romantic thriller	Disney+ (Star Hub)	July 7, 2023	1 h 34 min	French
WHO	Psychological thriller	Theatrical release	May 30, 2026	2 h 10 min	French

=== Documentaries ===
Title	Subject	Original network	Premiere	Runtime	Language
Finding Michael	Search and rescue/Biographical	Disney+ (Star Hub)	March 15, 2023	1 h 40 min	English
Hideo Kojima: Connecting Worlds	Biographical	Disney+ (Star Hub)	February 23, 2024	59 min	Japanese

== Hotstar ==
Disney announced that the streaming service Hotstar would no longer be available in the United States in late 2022 and would integrate into Hulu instead.
