= List of Star+ original programming =

Star+ (stylised as ST★R+) was a video-on-demand service from The Walt Disney Company launched in Latin America on August 31, 2021. Star+ also produced original local content which was exclusively released on the platform. It was announced that all Star+ content would be integrated into the Star hub on Disney+ starting June 26, 2024, while the standalone app Star+ was discontinued on July 24, 2024.

== Original programming ==
=== Star+ Originals ===
==== Drama ====
Title	Genre	Premiere	Seasons	Runtime	Language	Status
Not My Fault: Mexico	Drama	September 17, 2021	1 season, 10 episodes	38–47 min	Spanish	Miniseries
Insanity	Horror/Psychological thriller	December 3, 2021 (Note: Brazil); January 26, 2022 (Note: Rest of Latin America)	1 season, 8 episodes	32–38 min	Portuguese	Ended
Santa Evita	Historical drama	July 26, 2022	7 episodes	36–47 min	Spanish	Miniseries
Não Foi Minha Culpa	Drama	August 10, 2022	1 season, 10 episodes	35–51 min	Portuguese	Miniseries
No fue mi culpa: Colombia	Drama	August 10, 2022	1 season, 10 episodes	38–47 min	Spanish	Miniseries
El repatriado	Drama	September 21, 2022	1 season, 10 episodes	33–45 min	Spanish	Ended (Note: These shows were once available as Star+ Originals, but have been since removed from the service.)
Limbo	Drama	September 28, 2022	1 season, 10 episodes	32–42 min	Spanish	Ended
O Rei da TV	Biographical drama	October 19, 2022	2 seasons, 16 episodes	34–62 min	Portuguese	Ended (Note: Star+ service was migrated to Disney+ before additional seasons could premiere on the service.)
Checo	Sports drama	November 4, 2022	4 episodes	25 min	Spanish	Miniseries
Santo Maldito	Thriller drama	February 8, 2023	1 season, 8 episodes	32–42 min	Portuguese	Ended
Horario estelar	Thriller	February 15, 2023	1 season, 10 episodes	33–44 min	Spanish	Ended
El grito de las mariposas	Historical drama	March 8, 2023	13 episodes	38–56 min	Spanish	Miniseries
Ringo. Gloria y muerte	Biopic	March 24, 2023	7 episodes	30–50 min	Spanish	Miniseries
Diciembre 2001	Drama	June 7, 2023	1 season, 6 episodes	60 min	Spanish	Ended
Pancho Villa: El Centauro del Norte	Period drama	July 19, 2023	1 season, 10 episodes	30 min	Spanish	Ended
El Mantequilla: Maestro de la estafa	True crime drama	September 13, 2023	8 episodes	24–38 min	Spanish	Miniseries
Últimas Férias	Drama thriller	November 8, 2023	1 season, 8 episodes	34–41 min	Portuguese	Ended
A História Delas	Drama	December 6, 2023	1 season, 8 episodes	45–55 min	Portuguese	Ended
Hay algo en el bosque	Supernatural horror	February 7, 2024	1 season, 8 episodes	TBA	Spanish	Ended
Coppola, el representante	Biopic	March 15, 2024	6 episodes	33–45 min	Spanish	Miniseries

==== Comedy ====
Title	Genre	Premiere	Seasons	Runtime	Language	Status
Terapia alternativa	Comedy	September 24, 2021	2 seasons, 17 episodes	31–44 min	Spanish	Ended
Los protectores	Comedy drama	March 9, 2022	2 seasons, 15 episodes	31–45 min	Spanish	Ended
El galán. La TV cambió, él no	Black comedy	June 8, 2022	1 season, 12 episodes	23–38 min	Spanish	Ended
El encargado	Comedy drama	October 26, 2022	2 seasons, 18 episodes	28–32 min	Spanish	Ended
Robo mundial	Comedy drama	November 9, 2022	1 season, 6 episodes	24–31 min	Spanish	Ended
Máscara contra caballero	Comedy	April 19, 2023	1 season, 8 episodes	22–26 min	Spanish	Ended
Planners	Comedy drama	May 5, 2023	2 seasons, 13 episodes	30–41 min	Spanish	Ended
Dois Tempos	Comedy drama	May 10, 2023	1 season, 8 episodes	32–39 min	Portuguese	Ended
Compro Likes	Comedy	September 22, 2023	1 season, 5 episodes	28–32 min	Portuguese	Ended
Nada	Comedy	October 11, 2023	1 season, 5 episodes	28–25 min	Spanish	Ended
How to Be a Carioca	Comedy	October 18, 2023	1 season, 6 episodes	28–30 min	Portuguese	Ended
Soy tu fan: La fiesta continúa	Comedy	November 15, 2023	1 season, 8 episodes	28–30 min	Spanish	Ended
Desejos S.A	Comedy drama	March 27, 2024	1 season, 6 episodes	29–36 min	Portuguese	Ended
Fabricantes de ovnis	Science fiction comedy	April 3, 2024	1 season, 10 episodes	21–27 min	Spanish	Ended

==== Unscripted ====
===== Docuseries =====
Title	Genre	Premiere	Seasons	Runtime	Language	Status
Más allá de Diego	Sports	November 19, 2021	3 episodes	39–40 min	Spanish	Miniseries
Lo que no sabías del humor argentino	Humor	May 25, 2022	1 season, 6 episodes	TBA	Spanish	Ended
Lo que no sabías del humor mexicano	Humor	May 25, 2022	1 season, 6 episodes	TBA	Spanish	Ended
O Que Você Não Sabia Sobre o Humor Brasileiro	Humor	May 25, 2022	1 season, 6 episodes	TBA	Portuguese	Ended
Hache. Lo que no se nombra	News magazine	October 19, 2022	1 season, 7 episodes	25–35 min	Spanish	Ended
El juego sagrado	Sports	November 18, 2022	1 season, 8 episodes	51 min	Spanish	Ended
Peace Peace Now Now	Politics	November 23, 2022	4 episodes	TBA	Spanish	Miniseries
El Comandante Fort	Biography	January 25, 2023	4 episodes	34–61 min	Spanish	Miniseries
A Superfantástica História do Balão	Music	July 12, 2023	3 episodes	40–59 min	Portuguese	Miniseries
Releyendo Mafalda	Animation docuseries	September 27, 2023	4 episodes	TBA	Spanish	Miniseries
BePlaying: La voz detrás del sonido	Music	October 20, 2023	6 episodes	TBA	English; Spanish	Miniseries

===== Reality =====
Title	Genre	Premiere	Seasons	Runtime	Language	Status
El heredero: La dinastía del freestyle	Reality competition	January 20, 2023	1 season, 20 episodes	32–42 min	Spanish	Ended

===== Variety =====
Title	Genre	Premiere	Seasons	Runtime	Language	Status
Especiales Star+: En primera persona	Talk show	November 29, 2021	1 season, 6 episodes	60 min	Spanish	Ended

==== Co-productions ====
Title	Genre	Partner/country	Premiere	Seasons	Runtime	Language	Status
Bellas artes	Dark comedy	Movistar Plus+/Spain	April 11, 2024; May 1, 2024	1 season, 6 episodes	30 min	Spanish	Ended

==== Continuations ====
Title	Genre	Prev. network	Premiere	Seasons	Runtime	Language	Status
Impuros (seasons 3–4)	Crime drama	Fox Premium	August 31, 2021	2 seasons, 20 episodes	38–56 min	Portuguese	Ended
Bios, vidas que marcaron la tuya (season 3)	Music docuseries	National Geographic	August 31, 2021	1 season, 7 episodes	47 min	Spanish	Ended

== Exclusive international distribution ==
=== Exclusive programming ===
==== Drama ====
===== English =====
Title	Genre	Original network	Premiere	Seasons	Runtime	Status
American Horror Story (seasons 10–12)	Horror anthology	FX	August 31, 2021	3 seasons, 29 episodes	43–45 min	Ended
Big Sky	Crime thriller	ABC	August 31, 2021	3 seasons, 47 episodes	42–44 min	Ended
Black Narcissus	Drama	FX; BBC One	August 31, 2021	3 episodes	57–60 min	Miniseries
Feud	Biographical drama anthology	FX	August 31, 2021	2 seasons, 16 episodes	45–63 min	Ended
Filthy Rich	Soap opera	FOX	August 31, 2021	1 season, 10 episodes	41–44 min	Ended
Genius (seasons 3–4)	Biographical drama anthology	National Geographic	August 31, 2021	2 seasons, 16 episodes	44–57 min	Ended
Grey's Anatomy	Medical drama	ABC	August 31, 2021	19 seasons, 420 episodes	42–44 min	Ended
Helstrom	Superhero/Dark fantasy	Hulu	August 31, 2021	1 season, 10 episodes	44–55 min	Ended
The Hot Zone	Drama anthology	National Geographic	August 31, 2021	2 seasons, 12 episodes	44–47 min	Ended
Love, Victor	Hulu	Romantic teen drama	August 31, 2021	3 seasons, 30 episodes	24–31 min	Ended
Mayans M.C.	Crime drama	FX	August 31, 2021	5 seasons, 50 episodes	46–70 min	Ended
Next	Science fiction crime drama	FOX	August 31, 2021	1 season, 10 episodes	43–46 min	Ended
A Teacher	Drama	FX on Hulu	August 31, 2021	10 episodes	21–29 min	Miniseries
The Walking Dead (season 11)	Zombie apocalypse/Horror	AMC	August 31, 2021	1 season, 24 episodes	42–67 min	Ended
Y: The Last Man	Post-apocalyptic science fiction	FX on Hulu	September 13, 2021	1 season, 10 episodes	47–54 min	Ended
American Horror Stories	Horror anthology	FX on Hulu	October 20, 2021	3 seasons, 19 episodes	38–49 min	Ended
Chucky	Horror	Syfy; USA Network	October 27, 2021	3 seasons, 24 episodes	41–54 min	Ended
Dopesick	Drama	Hulu	November 12, 2021	8 episodes	57–63 min	Miniseries
Law & Order: Organized Crime	Crime drama	NBC (seasons 1–4)	November 24, 2021	4 seasons, 65 episodes	40–49 min	Ended
Motherland: Fort Salem	Supernatural drama	Freeform	December 22, 2021	3 seasons, 30 episodes	41–51 min	Ended
The Premise	Anthology	FX on Hulu	January 12, 2022	1 season, 5 episodes	28−33 min	Ended
Pam & Tommy	Biographical drama	Hulu	February 2, 2022	8 episodes	43–51 min	Miniseries
The Dropout	Drama	Hulu	March 3, 2022	8 episodes	45–55 min	Miniseries
Our Kind of People	Drama	Fox	April 6, 2022	1 season, 12 episodes	44 min	Ended
Under the Banner of Heaven	Crime drama	FX on Hulu	April 28, 2022	7 episodes	63–88 min	Miniseries
Wu-Tang: An American Saga	Drama	Hulu	May 5, 2022	3 seasons, 30 episodes	41–58 min	Ended
Queens	Musical drama	ABC	June 1, 2022	1 season, 13 episodes	41–44 min	Ended
American Crime Story	True crime anthology drama	FX	June 22, 2022	3 seasons, 29 episodes	41–66 min	Ended
Mike	Biographical drama	Hulu	August 25, 2022	8 episodes	21–33 min	Miniseries
Pistol	Biographical drama	FX on Hulu	August 31, 2022	6 episodes	45–56 min	Miniseries
Conversations with Friends	Drama	BBC Three; Hulu	September 21, 2022	1 season, 12 episodes	25–31 min	Miniseries
Reasonable Doubt	Legal drama	Hulu	September 27, 2022	1 season, 9 episodes	46–55 min	Ended
The Old Man	Action thriller	FX	September 28, 2022	1 season, 7 episodes	60–64 min	Ended
Tell Me Lies	Romantic drama	Hulu	September 28, 2022	1 season, 10 episodes	45–53 min	Ended
Welcome to Chippendales	Biographical drama	Hulu	November 22, 2022	8 episodes	35–46 min	Miniseries
The Handmaid's Tale	Dystopian drama	Hulu	December 14, 2022	5 seasons, 56 episodes	44–64 min	Ended
The Patient	Psychological thriller	FX on Hulu	December 21, 2022	10 episodes	21–46 min	Miniseries
Women of the Movement	Historical drama	ABC	January 25, 2023	6 episodes	44–67 min	Miniseries
Fleishman Is in Trouble	Drama	FX on Hulu	February 22, 2023	8 episodes	47–52 min	Miniseries
Kindred	Science fiction drama	FX on Hulu	March 29, 2023	1 season, 8 episodes	36–54 min	Ended
Tiny Beautiful Things	Drama	Hulu	April 7, 2023	8 episodes	26–32 min	Miniseries
A Small Light	Biographical drama	National Geographic	May 2, 2023	8 episodes	40–53 min	Miniseries
The Watchful Eye	Mystery thriller	Freeform	May 10, 2023	1 season, 10 episodes	41–45 min	Ended
Alaska Daily	Drama	ABC	May 17, 2023	1 season, 10 episodes	42–44 min	Ended
The Clearing	Psychological thriller	Disney+ (Star Hub)	May 24, 2023	8 episodes	45–52 min	Miniseries
Saint X	Psychological drama	Hulu	June 7, 2023	8 episodes	42–53 min	Miniseries
Class of '09	Crime drama	FX on Hulu	June 21, 2023	1 season, 8 episodes	37–48 min	Miniseries
Great Expectations	Period drama	BBC; FX on Hulu	June 28, 2023	6 episodes	56–58 min	Miniseries
Will Trent	Legal drama	ABC	July 26, 2023	1 season, 13 episodes	42–44 min	Ended
Justified: City Primeval	Neo-Western crime drama	FX	September 13, 2023	8 episodes	43–52 min.	Miniseries
Black Cake	Historical drama	Hulu	November 8, 2023	1 season, 8 episodes	54–61 min	Ended
A Murder at the End of the World	Murder mystery	FX on Hulu	November 14, 2023	7 episodes	42–72 min	Miniseries
Faraway Downs	Historical drama	Disney+ (Star Hub)	November 26, 2023	6 episodes	24–49 min	Miniseries
The Artful Dodger	Period heist drama	Disney+ (Star Hub)	November 29, 2023	1 season, 8 episodes	41–49 min	Ended
Culprits	Heist thriller/Dark comedy	Disney+ (Star Hub)	November 29, 2023	1 season, 8 episodes	48–57 min	Ended
Death and Other Details	Murder mystery	Hulu	January 16, 2024	1 season, 10 episodes	40–52 min	Ended
Shōgun	Historical drama	FX on Hulu	February 27, 2024	1 season, 10 episodes	53–70 min	Ended
The Veil	Spy thriller	FX on Hulu	April 30, 2024	6 episodes	38–46 min	Miniseries
Shardlake	Historical mystery	Disney+ (Star Hub)	May 1, 2024	1 season, 4 episodes	45–54 min	Ended
Clipped	Sports drama	FX on Hulu	June 4, 2024	6 episodes	44–49 min	Miniseries
Queenie	Drama	Channel 4; Hulu	June 7, 2024	1 season, 8 episodes	25–26 min	Miniseries

===== French =====
Title	Genre	Original network	Premiere	Seasons	Runtime	Status
Oussekine	Drama	Disney+ (Star Hub)	May 11, 2022	4 episodes	55–65 min	Miniseries
Becoming Karl Lagerfeld	Biopic	Disney+ (Star Hub)	June 7, 2024	6 episodes	38–49 min	Miniseries

===== Indonesian =====
Title	Genre	Original network	Premiere	Seasons	Runtime	Status
Virgin: The Series	Teen drama	Disney+ Hotstar	March 1, 2023	10 episodes	46–57 min	Miniseries
Wedding Agreement: The Series	Romantic drama	Disney+ Hotstar	March 15, 2023	1 season, 10 episodes	40–69 min	Ended
What We Lose to Love	Romantic fantasy drama	Disney+ Hotstar	April 19, 2023	12 episodes	28–34 min	Miniseries
Blood Curse	Horror drama	Disney+ Hotstar	June 7, 2023	10 episodes	41–49 min	Miniseries

===== Japanese =====
Title	Genre	Original network	Premiere	Seasons	Runtime	Status
Because We Forget Everything	Mystery drama	Disney+ (Star Hub)	December 14, 2022	10 episodes	26–37 min	Miniseries
Gannibal	Horror thriller	Disney+ (Star Hub)	December 28, 2022	1 season, 7 episodes	33–49 min	Ended
Atom's Last Shot	Video game industry drama	TBS	April 12, 2023	9 episodes	45–69 min	Miniseries
Dragons of Wonderhatch	Anime/Live-action hybrid	Disney+ (Star Hub)	December 20, 2023	8 episodes	33–46 min	Miniseries
House of the Owl	Political drama	Disney+ (Star Hub)	April 24, 2024	10 episodes	34–50 min	Miniseries

===== Korean =====
Title	Genre	Original network	Premiere	Seasons	Runtime	Status
May It Please the Court	Legal drama	Disney+ (Star Hub)	September 21, 2022	12 episodes	64–66 min	Miniseries
Soundtrack #1	Musical romantic drama	Disney+ (Star Hub)	October 21, 2022	4 episodes	40–55 min	Miniseries
Shadow Detective	Drama	Disney+ (Star Hub)	October 26, 2022	2 seasons, 16 episodes	54–61 min	Ended
Kiss Sixth Sense	Romantic fantasy drama	Disney+ (Star Hub)	December 2, 2022	12 episodes	62–73 min	Miniseries
Connect	Fantasy crime thriller	Disney+ (Star Hub)	December 7, 2022	6 episodes	36–46 min	Miniseries
Big Bet	Drama	Disney+ (Star Hub)	December 21, 2022	2 seasons, 16 episodes	49–58 min	Ended
Call It Love	Romantic drama	Disney+ (Star Hub)	February 22, 2023	16 episodes	71–73 min	Miniseries
The First Responders	Medical drama	SBS TV	April 12, 2023	1 season, 12 episodes	59–70 min	Ended
Pandora: Beneath the Paradise	Revenge drama	tvN	April 12, 2023	16 episodes	62–66 min	Miniseries
Doctor Lawyer	Medical-legal drama	MBC	April 19, 2023	16 episodes	63–64 min	Miniseries
RACE	Workplace drama	Disney+ (Star Hub)	May 10, 2023	12 episodes	53–63 min	Miniseries
LINK: Eat, Love, Kill	Romantic fantasy drama	tvN	May 24, 2023	16 episodes	60–72 min	Miniseries
The Golden Spoon	Fantasy drama	MBC	July 12, 2023	16 episodes	68–80 min	Miniseries
Moving	Action thriller	Disney+ (Star Hub)	August 9, 2023	20 episodes	38–58 min	Miniseries
Adamas	Fantasy crime drama	tvN	August 30, 2023	16 episodes	65–78 min	Miniseries
The Worst of Evil	Crime drama	Disney+ (Star Hub)	September 27, 2023	12 episodes	52–69 min	Miniseries
Vigilante	Action thriller	Disney+ (Star Hub)	November 8, 2023	8 episodes	42–54 min	Miniseries
Soundtrack #2	Musical romantic drama	Disney+ (Star Hub)	December 6, 2023	6 episodes	41–46 min	Miniseries
A Shop for Killers	Action drama	Disney+ (Star Hub)	January 17, 2024	8 episodes	44–62 min	Miniseries
The Impossible Heir	Revenge drama	Disney+ (Star Hub)	February 28, 2024	12 episodes	51–65 min	Miniseries
Blood Free	Thriller	Disney+ (Star Hub)	April 10, 2024	10 episodes	46–50 min	Miniseries
Uncle Samsik	Historical drama	Disney+ (Star Hub)	May 15, 2024	16 episodes	44–46 min	Miniseries

===== Spanish =====
Title	Genre	Original network	Premiere	Seasons	Runtime	Status
La última	Drama	Disney+ (Star Hub)	December 2, 2022	5 episodes	47–58 min	Miniseries
La chica invisible	Drama thriller	Disney+ (Star Hub	March 22, 2023	8 episodes	31–42 min	Miniseries
Cristóbal Balenciaga	Biopic	Disney+ (Star Hub)	January 19, 2024	6 episodes	50 min	Miniseries
Nos vemos en otra vida	Crime thriller	Disney+ (Star Hub)	March 6, 2024	6 episodes	32–44 min	Miniseries
Las largas sombras	Drama thriller	Disney+ (Star Hub)	May 10, 2024	1 season, 6 episodes	49–51 min	Ended

===== Turkish =====
Title	Genre	Original network	Premiere	Seasons	Runtime	Status
Ben Gri	Crime thriller	Disney+ (Star Hub)	November 16, 2022	1 season 8 episodes	30–41 min	Ended
Between the World and Us	Romantic drama	Disney+ (Star Hub)	December 14, 2022	1 season, 8 episodes	49–57 min	Ended
Kaçis: Runaway	Action thriller	Disney+ (Star Hub)	January 4, 2023	1 seasons, 8 episodes	39–51 min	Ended
Aktris	Crime thriller	Disney+ (Star Hub)	May 31, 2023	1 season, 8 episodes	42–43 min	Ended
Arayış	Crime thriller	Disney+ (Star Hub)	June 14, 2023	1 season, 6 episodes	48–62 min	Ended

===== Other =====
Title	Genre	Original network	Premiere	Seasons	Runtime	Language	Status
Small and Mighty	Legal comedy drama	Bilibili; Disney+ (Star Hub)	January 4, 2023	26 episodes	37–43 min	Mandarin	Miniseries
The Good Mothers	Crime drama	Disney+ (Star Hub)	April 5, 2023	6 episodes	56–60 min	Italian	Miniseries
Sam: A Saxon	Biographical drama	Disney+ (Star Hub)	April 26, 2023	7 episodes	43–61 min	German	Miniseries

==== Comedy ====
===== English =====
Title	Genre	Original network	Premiere	Seasons	Runtime	Status
Breeders	Comedy	FX; Sky Comedy	August 31, 2021	3 seasons, 30 episodes	21–31 min	Ended
Dave	Comedy	FXX	August 31, 2021	3 seasons, 30 episodes	24–34 min	Ended
Dollface	Comedy	Hulu	August 31, 2021	2 seasons, 20 episodes	22–32 min	Ended
Love in the Time of Corona	Romantic comedy	Freeform	August 31, 2021	4 episodes	27–35 min	Miniseries
Only Murders in the Building	Crime comedy	Hulu	August 31, 2021	3 seasons, 30 episodes	26–35 min	Ended
The Wonder Years	Coming-of-age comedy	ABC	August 31, 2021	2 seasons, 32 episodes	21–22 min	Ended
What We Do in the Shadows	Horror mockumentary	FX	October 27, 2021	5 seasons, 50 episodes	22–30 min	Ended
Rebel	Legal comedy drama	ABC	November 10, 2021	2 seasons, 12 episodes	41–44 min	Ended
Reservation Dogs	Teen comedy drama	FX on Hulu	November 24, 2021	3 seasons, 28 episodes	24–34 min	Ended
It's Always Sunny in Philadelphia	Sitcom	FX (seasons 1–8); FXX (seasons 9–15)	January 12, 2022	16 seasons, 170 episodes	18–43 min	Ended
How I Met Your Father	Sitcom	Hulu	March 9, 2022	2 seasons, 20 episodes	22–25 min	Ended
Life & Beth	Comedy	Hulu	March 18, 2022	2 seasons, 20 episodes	24–32 min	Ended
Single Drunk Female	Comedy	Freeform	June 8, 2022	2 seasons, 20 episodes	20–25 min	Ended
The Big Leap	Musical comedy drama	FOX	April 6, 2022	1 season, 11 episodes	40–45 min	Ended
The Orville (season 3)	Science fiction comedy drama	Fox (seasons 1–2); Hulu (season 3)	June 2, 2022	1 season, 10 episodes	60–88 min	Ended
Abbott Elementary	Mockumentary sitcom	ABC	August 10, 2022	2 seasons, 35 episodes	21–22 min	Ended
Wedding Season	Comedy thriller	Disney+ (Star Hub)	September 8, 2022	1 season, 8 episodes	30–41 min	Ended
The Bear	Comedy drama	FX on Hulu	October 12, 2022	2 seasons, 18 episodes	20–66 min	Ended
Reboot	Sitcom	Hulu	November 2, 2022	1 season, 8 episodes	22–33 min	Ended
This Fool	Comedy	Hulu	November 9, 2022	2 seasons, 20 episodes	22–31 min	Ended
Maggie	Comedy	Hulu	November 23, 2022	1 season, 13 episodes	22–24 min	Ended
Future Man	Science fiction	Hulu	December 7, 2022	3 seasons, 34 episodes	27–35 min	Ended
Extraordinary	Superhero comedy	Disney+ (Star Hub)	January 25, 2023	2 seasons, 16 episodes	27–32 min	Ended
History of the World, Part II	Sketch comedy	Hulu	March 6, 2023	8 episodes	21–30 min	Miniseries
Up Here	Musical romantic comedy	Hulu	March 24, 2023	1 season, 8 episodes	24–31 min	Ended
Unprisoned	Comedy	Hulu	March 29, 2023	1 season, 8 episodes	25–31 min	Ended
Not Dead Yet	Comedy	ABC	May 24, 2023	1 season, 13 episodes	20–22 min	Ended
The Full Monty	Comedy drama	Disney+ (Star Hub); FX on Hulu	June 14, 2023	8 episodes	38–54 min	Miniseries
The Other Black Girl	Dark comedy psychological thriller	Hulu	September 13, 2023	1 season, 10 episodes	25–32 min	Ended

===== French =====
Title	Genre	Original network	Premiere	Seasons	Runtime	Status
Les Amateurs	Action comedy	Disney+ (Star Hub)	October 19, 2022	2 seasons, 10 episodes	30 min	Ended
Everything Is Fine	Comedy drama	Disney+ (Star Hub)	February 28, 2023	8 episodes	52 min	Miniseries

===== Korean =====
Title	Genre	Original network	Premiere	Seasons	Runtime	Status
Rookie Cops	Coming-of-age police procedural comedy drama	Disney+ (Star Hub)	October 12, 2022	16 episodes	53–63 min	Miniseries
Crazy Love	Romantic comedy	KBS2	May 24, 2023	16 episodes	62–69 min	Miniseries
Han River Police	Action comedy	Disney+ (Star Hub)	September 13, 2023	6 episodes	47–53 min	Miniseries

===== Other =====
Title	Genre	Original network	Premiere	Seasons	Runtime	Language	Status
Besos al aire	Romantic comedy	Disney+ (Star Hub)	August 31, 2021	2 episodes	77–79 min	Spanish	Miniseries
Boris	Comedy	Fox International Channels Italy (seasons 1–3); Disney+ (Star Hub) (season 4)	October 26, 2022	4 seasons, 50 episodes	25–35 min	Italian	Ended
Susah Sinyal: The Series	Comedy drama	Disney+ Hotstar	April 5, 2023	12 episodes	36–45 min	Indonesian	Miniseries

==== Adult animation ====
Title	Genre	Original network	Premiere	Seasons	Runtime	Language	Status
Bob's Burgers	Sitcom	Fox	August 31, 2021	13 seasons, 260 episodes	21 min	English	Ended
Duncanville	Sitcom	Fox	August 31, 2021	3 seasons, 39 episodes	21 min	English	Ended
Family Guy	Sitcom	Fox	August 31, 2021	21 seasons, 409 episodes	21 min	English	Ended
The Simpsons	Sitcom	Fox	August 31, 2021	34 seasons, 750 episodes	21 min	English	Ended
Solar Opposites	Science fiction sitcom	Hulu	September 29, 2021	4 seasons, 41 episodes	22 min	English	Ended
The Great North	Sitcom	Fox	October 13, 2021	3 seasons, 55 episodes	22 min	English	Ended
Crossing Swords	Dark fantasy comedy	Hulu	October 27, 2021	2 seasons, 20 episodes	22 min	English	Ended
M.O.D.O.K.	Superhero science fiction comedy	Hulu	November 3, 2021	1 season, 10 episodes	English	22 min	Ended
Hit-Monkey	Superhero science fiction comedy	Hulu	January 26, 2022	1 season, 10 episodes	22–27 min	English	Ended
Bless the Harts	Sitcom	Fox	May 18, 2022	2 seasons, 34 episodes	22 min	English	Ended
HouseBroken	Sitcom	Fox	September 21, 2022	2 seasons, 30 episodes	21 min	English	Ended
Koala Man	Superhero comedy	Hulu	January 9, 2023	1 season, 8 episodes	23–24 min	English	Ended
Little Demon	Sitcom	FXX	February 8, 2023	1 season, 10 episodes	22–26 min	English	Ended
Praise Petey	Comedy	Freeform	October 4, 2023	1 season, 10 episodes	20–21 min	English	Ended

==== Anime ====
Title	Genre	Original network	Premiere	Seasons	Runtime	Language	Status
Black Rock Shooter: Dawn Fall	Action science fantasy	Tokyo MX, BS11, KBS Kyoto, SUN, TV Aichi	October 19, 2022	12 episodes	24 min	Japanese	Miniseries
The Tatami Time Machine Blues	Mystery/Romantic comedy	Disney+ (Star Hub)	November 9, 2022	6 episodes	17–32 min	Japanese	Miniseries
Tokyo Revengers (season 2) (Note: Both the Christmas Showdown and Tenjiku arcs are listed together as season 2 on the Star+ service.)	Fantasy action drama	MBS, TV Tokyo, AT-X	January 8, 2023	1 season, 26 episodes	24 min	Japanese	Ended
Summer Time Rendering	Supernatural suspense mystery	Tokyo MX, BS11, Kansai TV, KBC	January 11, 2022	25 episodes	24 min	Japanese	Miniseries
Bleach: Thousand-Year Blood War	Supernatural action-adventure	TV Tokyo	February 22, 2023	2 parts, 26 episodes	24 min	Japanese	Ended
Synduality: Noir	Science fiction action-adventure	TXN (TV Tokyo)	July 10, 2023	1 season, 14 episodes	24 min	Japanese	Ended
Phoenix: Eden17	Science fiction fantasy drama	Disney+ (Star Hub)	September 13, 2023	4 episodes	18–29 min	Japanese	Miniseries
Undead Unluck	Supernatural action-adventure comedy	JNN (TBS, MBS)	December 13, 2023	1 season, 24 episodes	24 min	Japanese	Ended
Ishura	Fantasy action-adventure	Tokyo MX, BS11, KBS Kyoto, SUN	January 3, 2024	1 season, 12 episodes	23 min	Japanese	Ended
Sand Land	Science fiction adventure comedy	Disney+ (Star Hub)	March 20, 2024	1 season, 13 episodes	24 min	Japanese	Ended
The Fable	Crime thriller	NNS (Nippon TV)	April 7, 2024	1 season, 25 episodes	23 min	Japanese	Ended
Go! Go! Loser Ranger!	Tokusatsu black comedy	JNN (TBS), BS11, AT-X	April 7, 2024	1 season, 12 episodes	23 min	Japanese	Ended
Mission: Yozakura Family	Spy thriller	JNN (TBS, MBS)	May 1, 2024	1 season, 27 episodes	23 min	Japanese	Ended

==== Unscripted ====
===== Docuseries =====
Title	Subject	Original network	Premiere	Seasons	Runtime	Language	Status
Hip Hop Uncovered	Hip hop	FX	August 31, 2021	6 episodes	53–60 min	English	Miniseries
A Wilderness of Error	True crime	FX	August 31, 2021	5 episodes	53–60 min	English	Miniseries
That One Word – Feyenoord	Sports	Disney+ (Star Hub)	September 1, 2021	1 season, 9 episodes	56–61 min	Dutch	Ended
McCartney 3,2,1	Music	Hulu	September 22, 2021	6 episodes	27–31 min	English	Miniseries
Pride	LGBT rights	FX	October 27, 2021	6 episodes	41–46 min	English	Miniseries
Man in the Arena: Tom Brady	Sports	ESPN+	November 16, 2021	1 season, 10 episodes	46–58 min	English	Miniseries
Wild Crime	True crime	Hulu	August 3, 2022	2 seasons, 8 episodes	39–41 min	English	Ended
Fearless: The Inside Story of the AFLW	Sports	Disney+	August 24, 2022	6 episodes	45–52 min	English	Miniseries
The Curse of Von Dutch: A Brand to Die For	True crime	Hulu	September 21, 2022	3 episodes	57–58 min	English	Miniseries
Save Our Squad with David Beckham	Sports	Disney+	November 9, 2022	4 episodes	43–47 min	English	Miniseries
Keep This Between Us	True crime	Freeform	November 16, 2022	4 episodes	43–44 min	English	Miniseries
Legacy: The True Story of the LA Lakers	Sports	Hulu	December 7, 2022	10 episodes	47–66 min	English	Miniseries
Lucky!	Sports	DAZN; Discovery+	December 27, 2022	1 season, 8 episodes	60 min	English	Ended
How I Caught My Killer	True crime	Hulu	January 12, 2023	9 episodes	42–50 min	English	Miniseries
The Come Up	Culture	Freeform	January 18, 2023	8 episodes	20 min	English	Miniseries
Welcome to Wrexham	Sports	FX	January 18, 2023	2 seasons, 33 episodes	20–47 min	English	Ended
Killing County	True crime	Hulu	February 3, 2023	3 episodes	46–47 min	English	Miniseries
Planet Sex with Cara Delevingne	Human sexuality	BBC Three; Hulu	February 14, 2023	1 season, 6 episodes	41–45 min	English	Ended
The Hair Tales	Beauty/Culture	OWN; Hulu	February 15, 2023	1 season, 6 episodes	41 min	English	Ended
Still Missing Morgan	True crime	Hulu	March 1, 2023	4 episodes	50–59 min	English	Miniseries
The Deep End	Biography/Spirituality	Freeform	March 1, 2023	42–43 min	4 episodes	English	Miniseries
Grails: When Sneakers Change the Game	Business	Hulu	March 8, 2023	6 episodes	22–28 min	English	Miniseries
Web of Death	True crime	Hulu	March 15, 2023	6 episodes	45–60 min	English	Miniseries
Where Is Private Dulaney?	True crime	Hulu	March 15, 2023	3 episodes	46–52 min	English	Miniseries
Death in the Dorms	True crime	Hulu	March 22, 2023	6 episodes	55–56 min	English	Miniseries
Pretty Baby: Brooke Shields	Biography	Hulu	April 3, 2023	2 episodes	68–70 min	English	Miniseries
The Lesson Is Murder	True crime	Hulu	April 5, 2023	3 episodes	53–54 min	English	Miniseries
RapCaviar Presents	Music	Hulu	April 12, 2023	6 episodes	41–43 min	English	Miniseries
The 1619 Project	History	Hulu	April 26, 2023	6 episodes	55–61 min	English	Miniseries
Lambert contre Lambert: au nom de Vincent	Patient rights	Disney+ (Star Hub)	May 10, 2023	4 episodes	38–46 min	French	Miniseries
Victoria's Secret: Angels and Demons	Investigative journalism	Hulu	May 17, 2023	3 episodes	55–58 min	English	Miniseries
Algiers, America	Sports	Hulu	May 24, 2023	5 episodes	53–59 min	English	Miniseries
Searching for Soul Food	Travel/Food	Hulu	June 2, 2023	8 episodes	22–27 min	English	Miniseries
Farm Rebellion	Agriculture/Environmentalism	Disney+ (Star Hub)	June 14, 2023	6 episodes	46–51 min	German	Miniseries
Full Count	Sports	Disney+ (Star Hub)	June 14, 2023	10 episodes	41–66 min	Korean	Miniseries
548 días: Captada por una secta	True crime	Disney+ (Star Hub)	June 30, 2023	3 episodes	52–62 min	Spanish	Miniseries
The Ashley Madison Affair	True crime	Hulu	July 7, 2023	3 episodes	42–43 min	English	Miniseries
The Secrets of Hillsong	Investigative journalism	FX	July 12, 2023	4 episodes	62–64 min	English	Miniseries
The Age of Influence	Social media/True crime	Hulu	July 26, 2023	6 episodes	49–65 min	English	Miniseries
Dear Mama	Biography	FX on Hulu	August 16, 2023	5 episodes	49–65 min	English	Miniseries
Demons & Saviors	True crime	Hulu	August 23, 2023	3 episodes	41–47 min	English	Miniseries
Betrayal: The Perfect Husband	True crime	Hulu	September 13, 2023	3 episodes	41–45 min	English	Miniseries
Never Let Him Go	True crime	Hulu	October 4, 2023	4 episodes	51–60 min	English	Miniseries
The Conversations Project	African-American culture	Hulu	October 11, 2023	1 season, 6 episodes	30–33 min	English	Ended
Brawn: The Impossible Formula 1 Story	Sports	Disney+ (Star Hub)	November 15, 2023	4 episodes	57–61 min	English	Miniseries
Drive with Swizz Beatz	Cars	Hulu	November 15, 2023	6 episodes	32–36 min	English	Miniseries
Superhot: The Spicy World of Pepper People	Food	Hulu	January 22, 2024	10 episodes	31–38 min	English	Miniseries
Me Hereafter	True crime	Hulu	February 29, 2024	1 season, 4 episodes	53–58 min	English	Ended
Wild Crime: Blood Mountain	True crime	Hulu	April 24, 2024	4 episodes	47–50 min	English	Miniseries
Thank You, Goodnight: The Bon Jovi Story	Music	Hulu	April 26, 2024	4 episodes	60–94 min	English	Miniseries
Cult Massacre: One Day in Jonestown	True Crime	Hulu	June 17, 2024	3 episodes	45 min	English	Miniseries

===== Reality =====
Title	Genre	Original network	Premiere	Seasons	Runtime	Language	Status
The D'Amelio Show	Reality	Hulu	September 15, 2021	3 seasons, 28 episodes	23–47 min	English	Ended
The Kardashians	Reality	Hulu	April 14, 2022	5 seasons, 50 episodes	39–56 min	English	Ended
The Zone: Survival Mission	Reality competition	Disney+ (Star Hub)	September 8, 2022	2 seasons, 16 episodes	54–62 min	Korean	Ended
Best in Dough	Cooking competition	Hulu	September 19, 2022	1 season, 10 episodes	33–34 min	English	Ended
Pink Lie	Dating show	Disney+ (Star Hub)	October 5, 2022	1 season, 12 episodes	72–115 min	Korean	Ended
Chefs vs. Wild	Cooking competition	Hulu	February 8, 2023	1 season, 8 episodes	39–41 min	English	Ended
Back in the Groove	Dating competition	Hulu	February 22, 2023	1 season, 8 episodes	45–57 min	English	Ended
Love Trip: Paris	Dating show	Freeform	April 19, 2023	1 season, 8 episodes	41–42 min	English	Ended
Secrets & Sisterhood: The Sozahdahs	Reality	Hulu	June 7, 2023	1 season, 10 episodes	36–44 min	English	Ended
Secret Chef	Cooking competition	Hulu	June 29, 2023	1 season, 10 episodes	40–46 min	English	Ended
Drag Me to Dinner	Cooking competition	Hulu	July 26, 2023	1 season, 10 episodes	35–43 min	English	Ended
The Prank Panel	Reality panel show	ABC	September 27, 2023	1 season, 10 episodes	43 min	English	Ended
Living for the Dead	Reality	Hulu	October 18, 2023	1 season, 8 episodes	45–49 min	English	Ended
Love in Fairhope	Reality	Hulu	October 25, 2023	1 season, 9 episodes	20–30 min	English	Ended
Love & WWE: Bianca & Montez	Reality	Hulu	February 2, 2024	1 season, 8 episodes	26–29 min	English	Ended
Vanderpump Villa	Reality	Hulu	April 1, 2024	1 season, 11 episodes	42–50 min	English	Ended
Chrissy & Dave Dine Out	Reality	Freeform	April 3, 2024	1 season, 5 episodes	42 min.	English	Ended
High Hopes	Reality	Hulu	April 20, 2024	1 season, 6 episodes	29–38 min	English	Ended

===== Variety =====
Title	Genre	Original network	Premiere	Seasons	Runtime	Language	Status
The Choe Show	Talk show	FX	November 17, 2021	1 season, 4 episodes	22–30 min	English	Ended

==== Continuations ====
Title	Genre	Original network	Premiere	Seasons	Runtime	Language	Status
Futurama (season 8)	Science fiction animated sitcom	Fox (seasons 1–4); Comedy Central (seasons 5–7); Hulu (season 8)	July 24, 2023	1 season, 10 episodes	26 min	English	Ended

=== Exclusive films ===
Title	Genre	Release date	Runtime
Vacation Friends	Comedy	August 31, 2021	1 hour, 45 min
Nomadland	Drama	August 31, 2021	1 hour, 48 min
Summer of Soul	Music	November 19, 2021	1 hour, 57 min
No Exit	Suspense thriller	February 25, 2022	1 hour, 57 min
Fresh	Comedy thriller	March 4, 2022	1 hour, 14 min
Crush	Romantic comedy	April 29, 2022	1 hour, 32 min
The Valet	Romantic comedy	May 20, 2022	2 hours, 3 min
Fire Island	Romantic comedy	June 3, 2022	1 hour, 45 min
The Princess	Fantasy action-thriller	July 22, 2022	1 hour, 34 min
Not Okay	Comedy	July 29, 2022	1 hour, 43 min
Prey	Science fiction horror	August 5, 2022	1 hour, 39 min
Grimcutty	Horror	October 10, 2022	1 hour, 41 min
Rosaline	Romantic comedy	October 14, 2022	1 hour, 37 min
Matriarch	Horror	November 11, 2022	1 hour, 25 min
Darby and the Dead	Supernatural teen comedy	January 27, 2023	1 hour, 40 min
Boston Strangler	Thriller	March 17, 2023	1 hour, 53 min
Bruiser	Drama	February 24, 2023	1 hour, 37 min
Rye Lane	Romantic comedy	March 31, 2023	1 hour, 22 min
Quasi	Comedy	April 20, 2023	1 hour, 39 min
Vacation Friends 2	Comedy	August 25, 2023	1 hour, 45 min
No One Will Save You	Science fiction thriller	September 22, 2023	1 hour, 33 min
Quiz Lady	Comedy	November 3, 2023	1 hour, 40 min
Suncoast	Coming-of-age drama	February 9, 2024	1 h 49 min
The Greatest Hits	Romance	April 12, 2024	1 h 52 min
Spermworld	Investigative documentary	April 12, 2024	1 h 23 min
Prom Dates	Coming-of-age comedy	May 3, 2024	1 h 25 min
