= Insanity (TV series) =

Brazilian television series

- Portuguese: Insânia
- Genre: Psychological thriller; Horror
- Created by: Lucas Vivo García Lagos
- Composer: Apollo Nove
- Country of origin: Brazil
- Original language: Portuguese
- No. of seasons: 1
- No. of episodes: 8

Production
- Executive producers: Leonardo Aranguibel; Fernando Barbosa; Mariana Pérez; Wellington Pingo; Mariano J Varela
- Producers: Simoni de Mendonça; Roberto Vivo; Lucas Vivo García Lagos
- Production locations: Paraná; Curitiba; Lapa; Uruguay
- Cinematography: Kaue Zilli
- Editors: Saulo Simao; Arthur Brito; Rodrigo Menecucci
- Running time: 30–38 minutes
- Production companies: Intro Pictures; Star Original Productions

Original release
- Network: Star+
- Release: December 3, 2021

Insanity (Portuguese: Insânia) is a Brazilian horror psychological thriller television series, produced by Intro Pictures and Star Original Productions for The Walt Disney Company. In Brazil, the series premiered as an original series on December 3, 2021 In Brazil and January 26, 2022 In Latin America on Star+. In the UK and other selected territories, the series released as an original on January 26, 2022 on Star via Disney+. In India and Southeast Asia, the series released under Select Picks on Disney+ Hotstar on January 26, 2022.

== Plot ==
Young forensics investigator Paula Costa suffers a nervous breakdown after a personal tragedy and is admitted to a mysterious psychiatric clinic. She is pushed to the limits of her sanity as she investigates the real reason and conspiracy behind her admission to the clinic.

== Cast ==
=== Main ===
- Carol Castro as Paula Costa
- Eucir de Souza as Dr. César Schultz
- Ravel Cabral as Maximiliano Marques Ribeiro
- Rafael Losso as Rafael Gustavo Mello
- Rafaela Mandelli as Camila Garcia
- Samuel de Assis as Lucas Oliveira

=== Recurring ===
- Bella Camero as Lúcia Costa
- Thomás Aquino as Jerônimo
- Pedro Inouê as Chico
- Lourinelson Vladimir as Barcellos
- Fabio Marcoff as Cônsul Almeida
- Leonardo Goulart as Seixas
- Rosana Stavis as Neusa Maurer

== Episodes ==
No. overall	No. in season	Title	Directed by	Written by	Original release date
1	1	"Episode 1" "Episódio 1"	Lucas Vivo García Lagos & Gustavo Bonafé	Lucas Vivo García Lagos & Marcelo Slavich	December 3, 2021
Gripped with despair after a family tragedy, forensics investigator Paula Costa suffers a mental breakdown that results in her admittance to a psychiatric hospital headed by Dr. César Schultz. Meanwhile, Paula’s partner from the force tries to help her, and another patient with controversial dietary habits is also admitted.
2	2	"Episode 2" "Episódio 2"	Lucas Vivo García Lagos & Gustavo Bonafé	Lucas Vivo García Lagos & Marcelo Slavich	December 3, 2021
Dr. César Schultz tries to soothe Paula’s concerns about her admission at the hospital, but a charismatic patient instigates the officer’s distrust about what goes on there. Meanwhile, distraught with news about his daughter, Lúcia’s father makes an unexpected visit to the hospital seeking answers, and Camila uncovers a clue.
3	3	"Episode 3" "Episódio 3"	Lucas Vivo García Lagos & Gustavo Bonafé	Lucas Vivo García Lagos & Marcelo Slavich	December 3, 2021
Disavowed by her former allies, Paula continues her search for answers into the mysteries that surround Dr. Schultz’s hospital — even as it pushes her to face her most terrifying fears. Meanwhile, Marques and Barcellos take the investigation to another level in an unusual alliance, and Rafael and Camila find valuable information about Lúcia's case.
4	4	"Episode 4" "Episódio 4"	Lucas Vivo García Lagos & Gustavo Bonafé	Lucas Vivo García Lagos & Marcelo Slavich	December 3, 2021
Paula is visited by a surprising figure in a frightening dream, leaving her even more unbalanced in her struggle to distinguish reality from fantasy. Overwhelmed with his suspicions, Marques decides to go to the hospital and confront the first person he sees. Meanwhile, an encounter with a mysterious person at the Nevoa Branca cemetery brings Rafael to change the course of his investigation.
5	5	"Episode 5" "Episódio 5"	Lucas Vivo García Lagos & Gustavo Bonafé	Lucas Vivo García Lagos & Marcelo Slavich	December 3, 2021
Putting aside her unease about the doctor’s ulterior motives, Paula agrees to allow Dr. Schultz to analyze her dreams. Marques — increasingly convinced that something strange is going on — returns to the hospital, but a new presence tries to steer him away. Meanwhile, Rafael loses sight of the danger that his investigation has brought into his life.
6	6	"Episode 6" "Episódio 6"	Lucas Vivo García Lagos & Gustavo Bonafé	Lucas Vivo García Lagos & Marcelo Slavich	December 3, 2021
Lucas makes a startling revelation to Paula, but her dreams don’t paint good news for her or her allies. Marques is forced to revisit past traumas and take drastic measures to continue his investigation. Meanwhile, Rafael settles accounts with the only person who knows what happened to his daughter.
7	7	"Episode 7" "Episódio 7"	Lucas Vivo García Lagos & Gustavo Bonafé	Lucas Vivo García Lagos & Marcelo Slavich	December 3, 2021
Paula must fight her better instincts when Lucas brings her to the meeting she’s been waiting for her entire life. Unaware that he would be visited at his own home, Schultz and Marques go head-to-head in a confrontation that ends in tragedy.
8	8	"Episode 8" "Episódio 8"	Lucas Vivo García Lagos & Gustavo Bonafé	Lucas Vivo García Lagos & Marcelo Slavich	December 3, 2021
Paula is confronted with her innermost fears on a terrifying walk alongside Lucas, who visits her perfect world in what may be a one-way trip. Trapped physically and mentally, the investigator only has Camila to turn to.
