= The Big Leap =

American comedy-drama television series

- Genre: Comedy drama
- Created by: Liz Heldens
- Based on: Big Ballet
- Starring: Scott Foley; Simone Recasner; Ser'Darius Blain; Jon Rudnitsky; Raymond Cham Jr.; Mallory Jansen; Kevin Daniels; Anna Grace Barlow; Adam Kaplan; Piper Perabo; Teri Polo
- Composer: Joe Wong
- Country of origin: United States
- Original language: English
- No. of seasons: 1
- No. of episodes: 11

Production
- Executive producers: Liz Heldens; Jason Winer; Sue Naegle; Garry A. Brown; Peter Dale; Jon Radler; Matt Ward
- Producers: Scott Foley; Franki Butler; Christopher Scott
- Camera setup: Single-camera
- Running time: 44–45 minutes
- Production companies: Naegle Ink; Small Dog Picture Company; Selfish Mermaid; Fox Entertainment; 20th Television

Original release
- Network: Fox
- Release: September 20 – December 6, 2021

The Big Leap is an American musical comedy drama television series created by Liz Heldens, based on the British reality miniseries Big Ballet, which aired on Fox during the 2021–22 television season. In March 2022, the series was canceled after one season.

== Premise ==
The Big Leap is a drama which revolved around a group of diverse, down-on-their-luck characters attempting to change their lives by participating in a potentially life-ruining reality dance show competition.

== Cast ==
=== Main ===
- Scott Foley as Nick Blackburn
- Simone Recasner as Gabby Lewis
- Ser'Darius Blain as Reggie Sadler
- Jon Rudnitsky as Mike Devries
- Raymond Cham Jr. as Justin Reyes
- Mallory Jansen as Monica Suillvan
- Kevin Daniels as Wayne Fontaine
- Anna Grace Barlow as Brittney Lovewell
- Adam Kaplan as Simon Lovewell
- Piper Perabo as Paula Clark
- Teri Polo as Julia Perkins

=== Recurring ===
- Tom Lennon as Zach Peterman
- Robert Wisdom as Earl Reyes
- Fabrice Calmels as Claude
- Brett Tucker as Linus
- Rachel A. Kim as Miriam

== Episodes ==
No.	Title	Directed by	Written by	Original release date	Prod. code	U.S viewers (millions)
1	"I Want You Back"	Jason Winer	Teleplay by : Liz Heldens	September 20, 2021 (Note: "I Want You Back" and "Classic Tragic Love Triangle" were released on September 14, 2021, on fox.com, Hulu, and on-demand.)	1DGR01	1.47
2	"Classic Tragic Love Triangle"	Jason Winer	Liz Heldens	September 27, 2021	1DGR02	1.46
3	"The White Swan Lives!"	Gail Mancuso	Matt Ward	October 4, 2021	1DGR03	1.30
4	"Nothing But Money Shots"	Rachel Raimist	Sarah Tapscott	October 11, 2021	1DGR04	1.25
5	"We Were Just Babies"	Charles Randolph-Wright	Britta Lundin	October 18, 2021	1DGR05	1.19
6	"I Should Have Gone To Motown"	Erin O'Malley	Dennis Saldua	October 25, 2021	1DGR06	1.04
7	"Revenge Plot"	Kimmy Gatewood	Franki Butler	November 1, 2021	1DGR07	1.26
8	"Big Dumb Life"	Garry A. Brown	Adam Pulver & Jamie Savarese	November 8, 2021	1DGR08	1.11
9	"What Prevents Us?"	Jude Weng	Jessica Lee Williamson	November 15, 2021	1DGR09	1.35
10	"Swan Song"	Gail Mancuso	Dennis Saldua & Matt Ward	November 29, 2021	1DGR10	1.27
11	"We Make Our Own Light"	Jason Winer	Liz Heldens & Britta Lundin	December 6, 2021	1DGR11	1.23

== Production ==
=== Development ===
On January 28, 2020, Fox gave the project a pilot order, the first for the network's 2020–21 television season, with Fox Entertainment and 20th Television set as co-production partners and was written by Liz Heldens. The series ultimately skipped the step to the 2021–22 television season due to the COVID-19 pandemic, with Fox giving a series greenlight on April 28, 2021. Heldens was set as showrunner with Jason Winer announced as director and executive producer of the pilot. On May 17, 2021, during Fox's Upfront presentation, it was confirmed that the series was scheduled to premiere as a fall season entry during the 2021–22 television season.

=== Casting ===
In February 2020, Teri Polo, Matt Lucas, Ser'Darius Blain and Raymond Cham Jr. were cast in main roles for the pilot. In March 2020, Scott Foley was cast in the main role for this pilot including Simone Recasner and Jon Rudnitsky also joined the cast. On July 17, 2020, it was announced that Laura Benanti has been cast in the pilot. However, both Lucas and Benanti later exited the project. In December 2020, Piper Perabo was cast to replace Benanti in the lead role, with Mallory Jansen and Kevin Daniels joining the series in a main role. After the series was picked up in May 2021, Anna Grace Barlow joined the series. In July 2021, Adam Kaplan, Tom Lennon, and Robert Wisdom joined the cast in recurring roles. In October 2021, Brett Tucker joined the cast in a recurring role.

=== Filming ===
Production of the pilot episode commenced on December 2, 2020. On December 18, 2020, production was temporarily suspended due to positive COVID-19 test results, from the crew members. The pilot was filmed in Chicago, Illinois, and at the Rialto Theatre in downtown Joliet.

== Release ==
The series premiered on Fox on September 20, 2021 and concluded on December 6, 2021. In Canada, the series airs on CTV2. The series premiered on Disney+ via the streaming hub Star as an original series in selected countries. In Latin America, the series premiered as a Star+ original.

On March 4, 2022, multiple media outlets reported that Fox had canceled The Big Leap after a single season; despite critical acclaim, it had been the network's lowest rated series in the 2021–22 season.

Due to unknown reasons, the show was removed from all Disney streaming platforms on October 3, 2022, alongside other original Star shows.

== Reception ==
=== Critical response ===
On Rotten Tomatoes, the series holds an approval rating of 100% with an average rating of 8.50/10, based on 16 critic reviews. The website's critics consensus states, "The Big Leap's joyous celebration of life and love isn't remotely subtle, but with moves like this and charm to spare, why play coy?" On Metacritic, it has a weighted average score of 73 out of 100, based on 11 critics, indicating "generally favorable reviews".

=== Ratings ===
Viewership and ratings per episode of The Big Leap
No.	Title	Air date	Rating (18–49)	Viewers (millions)	DVR (18–49)	DVR viewers (millions)	Total (18–49)	Total viewers (millions)
1	"I Want You Back"	September 20, 2021	0.3	1.47	0.1	0.67	0.4	2.14 (Note: Live+7 ratings were unavailable, so Live+3 ratings have been used instead.)
2	"Classic Tragic Love Triangle"	September 27, 2021	0.3	1.46	0.1	0.54	0.3	1.99
3	"The White Swan Lives!"	October 4, 2021	0.2	1.30	0.1	0.58	0.3	1.88
4	"Nothing but Money Shots"	October 11, 2021	0.3	1.25	0.1	0.71	0.4	1.95
5	"We Were Just Babies"	October 18, 2021	0.2	1.19	0.1	0.71	0.3	1.90
6	"I Should Have Gone to Motown"	October 25, 2021	0.2	1.04	0.1	0.59	0.3	1.63
7	"Revenge Plot"	November 1, 2021	0.3	1.26	0.1	0.63	0.4	1.90
8	"Big Dumb Life"	November 8, 2021	0.2	1.11	0.1	0.66	0.3	1.77
9	"What Prevents Us?"	November 15, 2021	0.2	1.35	0.1	0.71	0.4	2.06
10	"Swan Song"	November 29, 2021	0.3	1.27	0.1	0.71	0.4	1.97
11	"We Make Our Own Light"	December 6, 2021	0.3	1.23	0.1	0.63	0.4	1.85
