= Not My Fault: Mexico =

- Spanish: No fue mi culpa: México
- Genre: Drama
- Created by: Alicia Flores; Ana María Parra; Emilia Salde
- Written by: Emilia Salde; Dariela Pérez; Alicia Flores; Ana María Parra Vázquez
- Directed by: Ana Lorena Pérez Ríos; Lucía Gaja; Julia Rivero Tames
- Composers: Esperanza de Velasco; Josefa de Velasco
- Country of origin: Mexico
- Original language: Spanish
- No. of seasons: 1
- No. of episodes: 10

Production
- Cinematography: Claudia BecerrilBulos; Ximena Amann; Luis Ávila
- Editors: Flor Efrón; Adriana Martínez; Lena Fajardo; Elva Guzmán
- Running time: 38–47 minutes
- Production companies: BTF Media; Star Original Productions

Original release
- Network: Star+
- Release: September 17, 2021

Not My Fault: Mexico (Spanish: No fue mi culpa: México) is a Mexican drama television series produced by BTF Media and Star Original Productions for The Walt Disney Company. The series is part of the three-part Not My Fault anthology series dealing with the issues of violence against women and femicide, which includes two other series, one each from Colombia and one from Brazil. In Mexico, the series premiered as an original series on September 17, 2021, on Star+.

== Plot ==
The anthology series Not My Fault deals with the topics of violence against women and femicide. In addition to storylines that span the entire series, each individual episode also tells its own story that explores both of these broad themes. These stories are based on real experiences that women of different ages, backgrounds and social classes have had and are still experiencing.

Nurse Mariana's life takes a tragic turn when her little sister, Liliana, who she cared for after the death of her parents, disappears without a trace. Some time later, Liliana's body is found and Mariana embarks on a tireless search to find out who killed Liliana and what happened to her during the years of her disappearance. In her search for the truth, Mariana discovers that Liliana is just another digit in a startling statistic from a country that is failing to curb brutal violence against women. Her pain encourages Mariana to help other women and to honor the life Liliana was taken from. As time goes on, Mariana gets to know more and more people who have been through terrible things and are struggling with anger, sadness, shame and fear. Mariana and others make it their goal to fight for justice through protests and other actions and to draw attention to the problems and provide information.

== Cast ==
- Paulina Gaitán as Mariana Zúñiga Lara
- Giovanna Utrilla as Liliana "Lili" Zúñiga Lara
- Damián Alcázar as Pedro
- Raúl Méndez as Santos
- Gonzalo Vega Jr. as Erick
- Vicky Araico as Beatriz García Pérez
- Rebeca Manríquez as Adela
- Paloma Alvamar as Rosa Sánchez Tetla
- Regina Alcalá as Ingrid
- Leidi Gutiérrez as Daniela „Dani“ Mendoza García
- Esmeralda Pimentel as Cecilia „Ceci“
- Lisa Owen as Gloria
- Andrea Chaparro as Rosaura
- Luz María Zetina as Sofía
- Yatzini Aparicio as Andrea
- Pía Watson as Flor
- Alejandro de la Madrid as Adán

== Episodes ==
No. overall	No. in season	Title	Directed by	Written by	Original release date
1	1	"Mariana"	Unknown	Unknown	September 17, 2021
Mariana is a nurse and has been taking care of her younger sister Liliana since the death of her parents. But her quiet, tranquil life is struck by tragedy when one day Liliana disappears without a trace. Desperate to find the truth, Mariana embarks on a journey that will change her life.
2	2	"Rosa"	Unknown	Unknown	September 17, 2021
After an unexpected reunion with her godson, Adela, a modest, hard-working woman, suspects that something has happened to Rosa, the mother of Jésika and Bryan. Adela suspects that her godson may have killed her and reports him.
3	3	"Ingrid"	Unknown	Unknown	September 17, 2021
Family is all we have, and we believe they will always be there for us. But after being abused by her cousins, Ingrid finds out that she can't count on the support of her family, who would rather sweep the whole thing under the rug.
4	4	"Daniela"	Unknown	Unknown	September 17, 2021
A woman in love knows no fear. With her indomitable and youthful spirit, Daniela is blind to the dangers around her, while her caring mother Beatriz tries to protect her. Daniela makes a decision regarding Lili – unaware of the consequences that will follow.
5	5	"Cecilia"	Unknown	Unknown	September 17, 2021
Cecilia now lives in Mexico City. But she is constantly haunted by a shadow of her past from Monterrey. It is a man who, driven by delusional love, cannot let her go and has fallen into a pathological obsession. A nosy neighbor with an unhealthy fixation on appearances observes the whole thing without realizing the danger Cecilia is in.
6	6	"Rosaura"	Unknown	Unknown	September 17, 2021
Gloria had to raise her son Adán alone after his father abandoned them. After a lonely and bitter childhood, Adán eventually grows up to be a violent and depraved man who preys on women. After falling victim to Adán, Rosaura, a young student, is left with the painful trauma of what she experienced.
7	7	"Sofía"	Unknown	Unknown	September 17, 2021
Sofía's face graces front pages across the country, but behind the facade of her seemingly perfect life, she struggles to end a toxic relationship. As an abuse victim, Sofía struggles to find the courage to break out of her familiar life.
8	8	"Andrea"	Unknown	Unknown	September 17, 2021
After Andrea's alleged suicide on a college campus, Julia decides to take a closer look. In doing so, she comes across a story filled with violence that moves her to bring the truth to light in order to get justice for Andrea.
9	9	"Flor"	Unknown	Unknown	September 17, 2021
Out of desperation, Flor leaves secret messages in her son's homework, hoping that his teacher, Marta, will help her escape her violent husband, who abuses and imprisons her.
10	10	"Liliana"	Unknown	Unknown	September 17, 2021
Liliana is kidnapped on the night she was going to tell Mariana and Eric about her pregnancy and taken to a brothel. There, her survival depends on keeping the drug dealer "El Rafa" happy long enough to plan her escape.

== See also ==
- Femicides in Ciudad Juárez
