= Original Sin – The Seven Sins =

2021 short film by Amy Tinkham

- Promotional release poster
- Directed by: Amy Tinkham
- Written by: Amy Tinkham
- Produced by: Amy Tinkham; Giles Martin; Allison Calleri; Selena Moshell
- Cinematography: Scotty Nguyen; Wyatt Stromer
- Edited by: Scotty Nguyen; Wyatt Stromer
- Music by: INXS
- Distributed by: Veeps
- Release date: July 16, 2021
- Running time: 27 minutes
- Country: United States
- Language: English

Original Sin – The Seven Sins is a 2021 short film directed by Amy Tinkham and inspired by Dante Alighieri's Inferno. The film stars Autumn Miller and Trevor Jackson and is intertwined with the music of INXS. The film was only available for 48 hours from 16 July on the Veeps platform.

== Background and release ==
The film is a project spearheaded by INXS mentor and manager Christopher Murphy. Murphy told Amy Tinkham to "take the catalogue and make a show out of it, and let the music tell you what to do" and for Amy Tinkham, "Devil Inside" was the starting point.

The film is an adaption of Italian writer Dante Alighieri's 14th century poem Inferno and the spiritual journey via the seven sins of purgatory — pride, envy, wrath, sloth, greed, gluttony and lust. It is seen through the eyes of broken-hearted Jane who starts her quest while isolated during last year's pandemic, to reach hope and identity.

Tinkham said many of the scenes were shot in one take, added the project was meant to be a live show, and one day it will be "with all the acting and dancing, but on a bigger scale".

Tinkham said "This has been a labor of love in every way that one can call something a labor of love, because I have done something I think that is really special and it is also in a way my thank you and my love letter to Chris Murphy and to INXS." Murphy died on 16 January 2021, aged 66.

== Cast ==
- Autumn Miller as Jane
- Trevor Jackson as Boy X
- Fabrice Calmels as The Angel
- Wyatt Stromer as The Ex-boyfriend

== Soundtrack ==
Original Sin – The Seven Sins

Soundtrack album by various artists
- Released: 16 July 2021

=== Track listing ===
No.	Title	Writer(s)	Length
1.	"Drum Opera" (performed by Jon Farriss)	Jon Farriss	3:11
2.	"Let it Ride" (performed by INXS)	Andrew Farriss; Michael Hutchence	3:45
3.	"Kill the Pain" (performed by Ida Redig)	Farriss; Hutchence	3:01
4.	"Never Tear Us Apart" (performed by Global Network & Sophia Amato)	Farriss; Hutchence	3:52
5.	"Mediate" (performed by Tricky & INXS)	Farriss; Hutchence	4:10
6.	"Suicide Blonde" (performed by George Alice)	Farriss; Hutchence	2:31
7.	"Mystify" (performed by Loane & INXS)	Farriss; Hutchence	5:52
8.	"What You Need" (performed by Wyatt Stromer & Eric Stromer)	Farriss; Hutchence	2:16
9.	"Spill the Wine" (performed by Michael Hutchence)	Charles Miller; Howard E. Scott; B.B. Dickerson; Lonnie Jordan; Harold Ray Brown; Thomas "Papa Dee" Allen; Lee Oskar; Eric Burdon	3:37
10.	"Taste It" (performed by Ida Redig)	Farriss; Hutchence	4:40
11.	"Don't Change" (performed by Vimala & Aden Jaron)		2:56
12.	"Need You Tonight" (performed by Trevor Jackson & Wyatt Stromer)	Farriss; Hutchence	2:13
13.	"New Sensation" (performed by Alterboy)	Farriss; Hutchence	3:32
