= Big Ballet =

Documentary about ballet dancers

- Genre: Documentary
- Directed by: Kirsty Cunningham; Anna Llewellyn
- Narrated by: Olivia Colman
- Composer: Mat Davidson
- Country of origin: United Kingdom
- Original language: English
- No. of series: 1
- No. of episodes: 3

Production
- Executive producers: Peter Dale; Emma Loach
- Editor: Steven Barclay
- Running time: 60 mins
- Production company: Rare Day

Original release
- Network: Channel 4
- Release: 6 February – 20 February 2014

Big Ballet is a 2014 British documentary program that follows Wayne Sleep and prima ballerina Monica Loughman as they help a troupe of amateur plus-size dancers realize their dream of dancing Swan Lake. The three-episode series, produced by Rare Day and broadcast on Channel 4, premiered on February 6, 2014.

The dancers, referred to in the show as "fat" or "real women", range from UK size 12 to 24 – significantly larger than the norm in classical ballet. Eighteen dancers were selected from a pool of more than 500 applicants to participate in the series.

== Cast ==
Big Ballet features Matthew Bourne, Derek Deane, Patricia Doyle, David Plumpton, Tamara Rojo, David Nixon and the English National Ballet.

== Set ==
It was predominantly filmed at the Northern Ballet; its final performance was staged at St George's Hall, Bradford in front of 1,500 people.

== Episodes ==
No.	Title	Original release date	Viewers (millions) (Note: From BARB)
1	Episode 1	6 February 2014	1.1
Over 200 auditionees are whittled down to 18 men and women to form the Big Ballet troupe. Can Wayne and Monica harness the dancers' passion, teach classical ballet and put on a performance the likes of which no one has ever seen before?
2	Episode 2	13 February 2014	1.1
Wayne and Monica audition the dancers for the parts in Swan Lake and the pressure is on to see who is cast as the lead White Swan and her evil counterpart the Black Swan. Having whittled down hundreds of auditionees to form their unique ballet company, Wayne and Monica – and the dancers – realise the size of the task ahead of them. Monica is a stickler for pure ballet discipline and training. She's set on turning the amateurs into an impressive dance troupe, but with just five months until the curtain goes up, the pressure is on.
3	Episode 3	20 February 2014	1.2
The Big Ballet dancers have just five weeks to perfect their own 25-minute version of Swan Lake. But this is not a full-time ballet troupe – classes on evenings and weekends must fit around work and home lives. The pressure on the dancers begins to mount, as the physicality of the task ahead and the enormity of what they have taken on begin to take their toll. Monica and Wayne feel the pressure too; as well as getting the dancers ballet-ready, they have to design a performance of Swan Lake that will confound the critics. The set, the costumes and the music all have to be spectacular. Wayne and Monica have drilled the dancers in basic ballet technique and cast all the roles. After months of training, injury setbacks and nerves, with less than five weeks to go before the dancers perform their supersize Swan Lake in front of an audience of 1500 – including the great and the good of the ballet establishment – can they realise their dream of dancing on stage?

== Adaptation ==
In 2021, an American series based on Big Ballet premiered on Fox called The Big Leap, which ran for one season. The show adapted the premise of Big Ballet into a fictional comedy-drama.
