= Fabrice Calmels =

French ballet dancer

Fabrice Calmels (born 18 September 1980) is a French ballet dancer and model who performed as a lead dancer with the Joffrey Ballet in Chicago, Illinois.

== Early life and education ==
Born and raised in Colombes, France, Fabrice Calmels began ballet training at three years old. At age 11, Calmels entered the Paris Opera Ballet School. During his seven years there, Fabrice worked with dance masters such as Serge Golovine, Gilbert Mayer, Max Bozzoni, John Neumeier, Jirí Kylián, Violette Verdy, and performed at the Palais Garnier theatre. It was during his last years of schooling that Calmels went through significant growth spurts to his current height of six feet six inches tall (199cm). He ultimately did not join the Paris Opera Ballet as his stature did not blend with the ensemble. Therefore, upon graduation from the Paris Opera School with a degree in Anatomy and the history of dance, Calmels moved to the United States to pursue his dance career.

In the United States Calmels furthered his training by joining The Rock School, and danced with the Pennsylvania Ballet and also the Balanchine style at The School of American Ballet. Later, he joined Boston Ballet, under the direction of Anna-Marie Holmes, where he learned the Russian technique with ballet masters Tatiana Terekhova and Sergei Berezhnoi.

Fabrice has an older brother: Oliver and a younger sister Élodie Calmels who is the international communication Director for Iberdrola.

== Career ==
In 2001, due to difficulties regaining his visa, Fabrice took advantage of a year back at home in Paris, France to perfect his pas de deux skills performing the acrobatic pas de deux for the famed Lido de Paris.

In 2002, Calmels established himself in Chicago with the Joffrey Ballet, under the direction of company co-founder Gerald Arpino.

In 2004, Calmels became a lead dancer at the Joffrey Ballet, markedly through his Principal role as Apollo. He was also coached by Sir Anthony Dowell for the title role of Oberon in Frederick Ashton's A Midsummer Night’s Dream.

In 2009, he performed the title role in the Joffrey Ballet's premiere of Lar Lubovitch's Othello, which he reprised in 2013. Calmels performed the Othello pas de deux for the 2016 Benois de la Danse Gala at the Bolshoi Theatre in Moscow, Russia.

In 2014 and 2016, Calmels was a guest judge on the Fox television show So You Think You Can Dance. In September 2014, Calmels established and set a Guinness World Record for Tallest Ballet Dancer in the World with an official height of 199.73 centimetres (6 feet 6.63 inches).

In 2015, Calmels was featured in the “Into the Galaxy” multi-media campaign for Samsung Electronics. Calmels appeared alongside supermodel Karlie Kloss in the Versace 2016 Fall/Winter campaign shot by famed photographer Bruce Weber.

In 2016, Calmels signed on to be represented by IMG Models.

In 2021, Calmels appeared as "Claude" in the Fox television show The Big Leap.

In his spare time, Calmels focuses on developing and producing his own multi-media dance based productions and is a member of the board of directors for the DizzyFeet Foundation.

== Filmography ==
=== Film ===
| Year | Title | Role | Notes |
|---|---|---|---|
| 2001 | Etoiles: Dancers of the Paris Opera Ballet | —N/a | |
| 2008 | The Dark Knight | Bodyguard | Uncredited |
| 2011 | Transformers: Dark of the Moon | Tourist | Uncredited |
| 2012 | Joffrey: Mavericks of American Dance | —N/a | |
| 2021 | Original Sin – The Seven Sins | The Angel | Short |

=== Television ===
| Year | Title | Role | Notes |
|---|---|---|---|
| 2018 | Empire | Dance Director | Episode: "False Face" |
| 2021–present | The Big Leap | Claude | 3 episodes |
