= Repatriated (TV series) =

Mexican Drama-Series

- Spanish: El repatriado
- Genre: Drama
- Written by: Héctor Valdés; Mauricio Somuano; Alejandra Urdiain
- Directed by: Felipe Martínez; Nuno Gomes
- Country of origin: Mexico
- Original language: Spanish
- No. of seasons: 1
- No. of episodes: 10

Production
- Producer: Mariano Carranco
- Production locations: Mexico City; United States
- Running time: 33–45 minutes
- Production company: BTF Media

Original release
- Network: Star+
- Release: September 21, 2022

Repatriated (Spanish: El repatriado) is a Mexican drama television series, which is produced by BTF Media for the Walt Disney Company. In Latin America, the ten-part first season of the series was released on September 21, 2022 on Star+.

== Plot ==
Leonel grows up in the United States believing that Roberto is his birth father. Although he is not sure of his origins and does not speak Spanish, he constantly has nightmares about the Mexico – United States border and a woman Leonel cannot remember. Leonel does not question anything, however, because he has been leading a happy life so far. In addition to the good relationship with his parents, he not only has a wonderful girlfriend and close friends, but also a more than promising future as a boxer. What he does not know is that this is about to be radically changed by a betrayal. One day, faced with an important battle, Leonel is classified as an illegal immigrant and as a result arrested and deported to Matamoros, Mexico, without the opportunity to prove his US citizenship. Fate now leads Leonel to a picturesque neighborhood in Mexico City, where he faces many new challenges. Leonel not only has to learn a new language, get used to the Mexican culture and break down prejudices, but also ensure his survival, get to know his roots, implement his ideas and uncover old secrets. At the same time, Leonel tries to make new friends and possibly the true love, without his big dream of being a professional boxer and his urge to return to the country where he had previously seen his home and where his old life was waiting for him to lose sight.

== Cast ==
- Ricardo Abarca as Leonel Reina
- Paco Rueda as El Gordo
- Dagoberto Gama as Don Chucho
- Valeria Burgos as Miss Meche
- Coco Máxima as Yadi
- Armando Hernández as Trejo
- Sonya Smith as April
- Esteban Caicedo as Kevin
- Erick Cañete as Iker
- Ian Sebastián as Martín
- Chappell Bunch as Grace
- Raquel Robles as Mary, la hondureña
- Estrella Solís as Guadalupe Contreras
