= That One Word – Feyenoord =

Sports television documentary series released on Disney+

- Genre: Documentary
- Narrated by: Winne
- Original language: Dutch
- No. of seasons: 1
- No. of episodes: 9

Production
- Cinematography: Tom Bakker
- Editors: Berend Boneschansker; Gijs Onvlee
- Running time: 56–67 minutes
- Production company: Lusus Media

Original release
- Network: Disney+
- Release: September 1, 2021

That One Word – Feyenoord (Dutch: Dat Ene Woord – Feyenoord) is a sports documentary series released on Disney+.

== Production ==
In February 2021, Feyenoord and The Walt Disney Company announced the production of a Disney+ series which would see the company producing a documentary about Feyenoord during the 2020–21 season. The series will consist of 8 episodes. In May 2021 Feyenoord announced that the series would be titled Dat ene woord – Feyenoord and would be available from August 27, 2021. It was later announced that the series would be getting a ninth episode, with the release of the first episode being pushed back to September 1.

In October 2021, Lusus Media confirmed that it was in discussions with Feyenoord and Disney about a possible second season of the series, with the first season being deemed a success. If given the go ahead the second season would be following Feyenoord during its 2022–23 season with episodes airing in 2023.

== Episodes ==
Series	Episodes	Originally released
1	9	1 September 2021
2	TBA	2023

=== Season 1 (2021) ===
No.	Title	Original release date
1	"Hoop"	September 1, 2021
After the 2019–20 Eredivisie season is stopped due to the COVID-19 pandemic, interrupting Feyenoord's great form, a new season starts with great hope among players, staff and supporters for a great upcoming. However, after a lack of new signings to strengthen the team and a draw against FC Twente tensions start to rise within the team.
2	"Lockdown"	September 8, 2021
With the Eredivisie going ahead with empty stadiums and the start of 2020–21 UEFA Europa League things start to take a turn for the worse on and off the pitch. Multiple players test positive for COVID-19, forcing them and multiple members if the team's staff to be quarantined. Robin van Persie joins the squad to help train the team's forwards as the players sit down in the dressing room to watch the draw for the Europa League Group Stages. The club's board discusses the club's finances as a result of the COVID-19 pandemic, with the club projected to no longer be able to play the salaries of their employees at the end of the season if the club does not qualify for European football while stadiums continue to be empty. The team plays their first match in an empty home stadium in the Rotterdam derby against Sparta Rotterdam, resulting in a 1–1 draw four days before the start of the Europa League. With the start of the Europa League the team travels to Croatia to play Dinamo Zagreb, resulting on a disappointing 0–0 draw after a good performance. As the team struggles with multiple players getting injured coach Dick Advocaat tries a new style of play with just two forwards, however the team suffers a 1–4 defeat at home against the Austrian club Wolfsberger AC. Days later the team wins the away match against FC Emmen 2–3, however the match being won is no cause for celebration after a poor showing and captain Steven Berghuis getting injured. The positive of the match is Naoufal Bannis, the 18-year old striker who scores the winning goal in the final seconds of the match, followed by him shortly after extending his contract with the club.
3	"Injuries"	September 15, 2021
The team starts preparing for the Europa League home match against CSKA Moscow, a crucial match after the club only has 1 point after the first two matches. With Jørgensen out injured and Berghuis still starting despite his inclusion in the matchday squad long in doubt the team plays a good match, resulting in a 3–1 win. Goalkeeper Justin Bijlow gets called up to the Netherlands national team, but just before the match against FC Groningen he gets injured, making him unable to play for months. Despite a 2–0 win over FC Groningen the atmosphere in the team is getting increasingly worse due to an increasing amount of injuries within the squad, with the club's supporters showing their appreciation for the injured Jørgensen by lighting flares near his home at night. As the gap between Ajax and PSV appears to be increasing the club, and especially the youth academy, feels an increasing amount of pressure. With the contracts of multiple coaches in the youth academy ending at the end of the season big changes are expected as the club aims to close the gap between the Under-18, Under-21 teams and the first squad as coach Dick Advocaat teams the club's youth players to not be ready to play in the first team. The team travels to Sittard to play Fortuna Sittard, resulting in a 1–3 win despite going down 1–0 early in the match followed by a red card for Orkun Kökçü. Following draws in the away match against CSKA Moscow and the home match against FC Utrecht coach Dick Advocaat announces that after the season he will retire from club football.
4	"Recovery"	September 22, 2021
After Dick Advocaat has announced that he will retire from club football after the end of the season Feyenoord starts the search for a new head coach. As Tyrell Malacia is on the verge of becoming the club's new starting left-back he suffers from a minor injury, making it doubtful whether he will be able to play in the fifth of the Europa League Group Stage, a match which ends in a disappointing 0–2 loss. To give the empty stadium at least some atmosphere the club and supporters allow other supporters to buy seats inside the stadium which will then be covered with a banner of their own design. Following a rumor that Arne Slot will become the club's new coach Dick Advocaat struggles to answer questions surrounding his and Feyenoord's future. As the club starts looking for a new striker to join the team in January due to an ever growing list of injuries and disappointing performances the club starts to look into the possibility of signing Argentine striker Lucas Pratto, all while the club attempts to extend the contract of defender Marcos Senesi. The team travels to Austria to play the final match of the Europa League Group Stage against Wolfsberger, a match which will see the club advance to the next round if the match is won, but the match results in a loss.
5	"Taken Out"	September 29, 2021
The team deals with the elimination from the Europa League after the loss against Wolfsberger, but focus has to immediately switch to the next three Eredivisie matches as the dissatisfaction about the team's playstyle grows. The final three matches before the winter break result in wins against VVV-Venlo & SC Heerenveen and a loss to Vitesse, with captain Steven Berghuis missing the match against Vitesse due to a groin injury and Nicolai Jørgensen missing the match against SC Heerenveen due to another injury. Bryan Linssen plays as the team's new striker in the match against SC Heerenveen, resulting in him scoring 3 goals, a hat-trick. With the winter break having arrived the team's new striker, Lucas Pratto, arrives on loan from the Argentine club River Plate. 2021 starts with wins against Sparta Rotterdam and PEC Zwolle, but Lucas Pratto fails to score as De Klassieker against rivals Ajax approaches. The team plays a good first half in the away match against Ajax, but due to missing multiple big chances the team is down 1–0 at halftime.
6	"Rivalry"	October 6, 2021
Despite a good second half against Ajax the team fails to score, resulting in a 1–0 loss. The team goes on to play in the Round of 16 of the KNVB Cup against Heracles Almelo, a match which is won 3–2. With the club's youth players continuing to be ignored by Advocaat the club starts to explore the possibility of the players being loaned to other clubs for the second half of the season, all while the 18-year old Aliou Baldé from Senegal arrives. Next up is the home match against AZ, a loaded match as AZ wants to challenge Feyenoord's status at a top 3 team while Feyenoord just poached AZ coach Arne Slot to become the club's new coach the next season, a match which is lost 2–3. After the match Feyenoord sporting director Frank Arnesen clashes with board members of AZ. The following day irritation within the team grows after assistant coach Cor Pot makes some derogatory comments about the squad and the upcoming new coach, suggesting he won't be able to perform as well as he did at AZ due to a lack of quality within the Feyenoord squad. Just days Feyenoord suffers a devastating 3–0 loss against SC Heerenveen, resulting in an hour long talk between Advocaat, Arnesen and Berghuis to talk about the future of the team as assistant coach Željko Petrović suddenly leaves the club to become the new head coach at Willem II. The week finishes with a surprising but good 3–1 win against PSV, followed by yet another away match against SC Heerenveen, this time for the Quarter-finals of the KNVB Cup.
7	"Deception"	October 13, 2021
The Cup match against Heerenveen turns into a deception. The team is down 1–0 at halftime but turns the match around in the second half and goes up 1–3, only to concede 3 goals after captain Steven Berghuis is sent off, resulting in a 4–3 loss. With the club being eliminated from the KNVB Cup qualification for European football starts to become difficult, and with no supporters still being allowed at matches the worst case scenario for the club is looking increasingly realistic. The club's players will have to accept another decrease in their salaries with the club's season ticket holders being asked to let the club keep the money they paid for their season ticket. The team once again struggles and goes down 2–0 in the away match against FC Twente, but ends up scoring twice for a 2–2 draw, but the media focuses on the reports that the players are forced to accept a second paycut, one which the players have refused. New assistant coach Koen Stam takes charge of the pre-match evaluation for the away match against FC Groningen, a match which ends in a 0–0 draw despite Feyenoord getting a good amount of chances to score. With two consecutive draws the match against AZ comes closer, a critical match as qualification for European football continues to get increasingly difficult, but the match is lost 4–2. With the club continuing to ask supporters to decline a refund for their season tickets displeasure is shown by the supporters due to plans for a new stadium in which prices for tickets will increase significantly. As the next home match is played the team gets a much needed 6–0 win against VVV–Venlo. Defender Geertruida is interviewed after it has been revealed that he has never been interviewed due to him stuttering. The next away match against PSV ends in a 1–1 draw, a good result but making it all the more difficult for the club to get the much needed 4th place in the league.
8	"Desperate"	October 20, 2021
With eight matches of the regular Eredivisie season remaining Feyenoord is still battling for a top 4 position. The hunt for the top 4 spot starts with a home match against FC Emmen which results in a 1–1 draw, followed by a 2–0 home win against Fortuna Sittard and a very important 1–2 away win against FC Utrecht. With 5 matches to go Feyenoord is just 2 points behind the 4th placed team Vitesse, who are also the next opponent. As an added bonus the Dutch government decides to experiment with a limited amount of supporters being allowed to attend all matches during the weekend, resulting in 6,000 supporters attending the match. Despite the importance of the match and the return of a limited amount of supporters the match ends in a 0–0 draw with captain Berghuis being sent-off with a straight red card. With 4 matches to go the team goes to The Hague to play the away match against ADO Den Haag who have already almost been relegated. Despite going up 0–1 early in the match and ADO Den Haag's bad recent form the match is lost 3–2, resulting in a top 4 finish becoming nearly impossible.
9	"Finale"	October 27, 2021
Following the disappointing loss against ADO Den Haag the team starts preparing for the upcoming match against their rivals Ajax, a match in which Berghuis and Toornstra will not be able to participate due to both of them being suspended. In the days before the match the team gains some confidence after Vitesse, their main competitor for the number 4 spot, loses. Ajax goes up 0–1 following an unlucky own goal by Senesi, however just before the half-time Feyenoord gets a penalty with Ajax-defender Álvarez being sent off. The penalty however is missed by Fer. With Malacia being sent off early into the second half the match is finished with 10 players on both sides, allowing Ajax to score another 2 goals for a 0–3 loss. With Pratto breaking his ankle during the match his season comes to an early end. With the club in bad financial shape and pad results on the pitch the club's main sponsor shows its loyalty to the club, providing a much needed positive boost. Following a 1–1 draw against Heracles Almelo the club can no longer finish in the top 4, meaning the team will have to play in the playoffs in order to qualify for next season's Europa Conference League. With the home advantage and the return of a limited amount of supporters during the playoffs there's a good amount of hope that the team will be able to win both matches. With a good performance in the semi-final against Sparta Rotterdam the team manages to get a 2–0 win, resulting in qualification for the final against FC Utrecht. With another 2–0 win in the final the team manages to finish a disappointing season in a positive matter, resulting in a lot of emotion for coach Advocaat as he retires from coaching club football.

=== Season 2 (2023) ===
Disney+ and Lusus Media are in talks for a second season.
