= Star (Disney+) =

Streaming content hub

- Logo used since 2021
- Dissolved: 8 October 2025; 13 months ago (excluding Japan)
- Successor: Hulu (excluding Japan)
- Country of origin: Asia Pacific (Star branding); Singapore (Disney+ content hub)
- Area served: Japan (since 8 October 2025)
- Parent: Disney Streaming (Disney Entertainment)
- Registration: Required
- Launched: 23 February 2021; 5 years ago
- Current status: Active (Japan only)

Star (stylized as ST★R) is an over-the-top content brand owned by Disney Streaming. Launched on 23 February 2021, Star primarily operated as a content hub on Disney+ in countries outside of the United States, and now exclusively operates as a content hub on Disney+ in Japan.

Star's content is similar to that of the Disney-owned American streaming service Hulu; it includes films and television series that fall outside of the core Disney+ content brands, including original productions from Hulu, ABC, FX, and Freeform, and content from the libraries of 20th Century Studios and its subsidiaries, ABC Signature, Touchstone Pictures, and Hollywood Pictures among others. Disney CEO Bob Chapek stated that the "Star" brand was used instead of Hulu because it was more recognizable in international markets.

In August 2021, Disney launched the Star brand in Latin and South America as a separate subscription service known as Star+, which also included sports content from ESPN Latin America and Brasil, and other third-party content. Star+ was discontinued in 2024, with its content merged into Disney+ under the Star brand as in other markets.

In 2023, after Disney acquired Comcast's share in Hulu to give it full ownership, the company began to similarly introduce a Hulu content hub to Disney+ in the United States for users subscribed to both services. In August 2025, Disney announced plans to replace Star with Hulu as its global general entertainment brand, which took effect on 8 October 2025, with Japan being the only country to retain the Star branding due to Disney not owning the Hulu brand in Japan.

== History ==
=== Background ===
The "Star" brand originated as a Hong Kong-based satellite broadcaster, which operated under that name as an acronym of "Satellite Television Asian Region", it was founded by Hutchison Whampoa in 1990, and had been acquired by News Corporation in 1993. After 2009, the Star brand was mainly restricted to the now-separately owned Star China Media, as well as Star India, which operates primarily in India, but also distributes programming internationally via services targeting viewers of Indian descent. The remainder of the Star Asia Pacific business was later brought under the Fox International Channels division.

Star India (as well as all of the now Fox Networks Group's Asia Pacific operations (Note: Although, the Asia Pacific operations do operate "Star"-branded TV services to date, to varying degrees. Not to be confused with the Japanese premium TV network of the same name, which albeit then a co-owned venture with three Japanese partners, is now a wholly separate business as the former 21st Century Fox sold its stake before the Disney acquisition completed.)) was then acquired by Walt Disney as part of its acquisition of 21st Century Fox on 20 March 2019.

During an earnings call on 5 August 2020, Disney CEO Bob Chapek announced that Disney planned to launch a new international, general entertainment service under the "Star" brand name in 2021. The plan superseded a previously announced international expansion of the majority-controlled American streaming service, Hulu, which has only expanded outside the United States to Japan. (Note: The Japanese branch would be acquired by Nippon TV in 2014.) Chapek argued that, outside of the United States, the Hulu brand is not well known while Star is much more recognizable.

=== Launch ===
Disney officially announced Star and Star+ on 10 December 2020, at its Investor Day Event. During the event, it was announced that Star would launch as a sixth brand tile within the Disney+ interface. Additional parental controls would be launched alongside Star's introduction. Although Star would be available at no extra cost to Disney+ subscribers, the introduction of Star would coincide with a price increase. Star was launched in Canada, United Kingdom, Western Europe, Australia, New Zealand and Singapore on 23 February 2021, while the service was launched in Hong Kong and Taiwan later in 2021. Disney promoted the launch by naming several stars in the International Star Registry.

Star+ was launched in Latin America on 31 August 2021. Star was also to launch in Central and Eastern Europe, Israel, South Africa and the MENA region in 2022. Star was launched in Japan and South Korea on 27 October 2021 and 12 November 2021, respectively. It was indeed launched in May 2022 in South Africa and in June 2022 in various MENA and European countries.

Subsequently, the European feeds of Star Plus, Star Bharat and Star Gold were rebranded as Utsav Plus, Utsav Bharat and Utsav Gold, respectively, on 22 January 2021, to avoid confusion with the streaming hub. Disney plans to produce more Korean, Japanese and other Asian content under Star and Disney+ in the next few years.

In May 2023, Disney rolled out the Star hub for Disney+ Hotstar subscribers in Indonesia, Malaysia and Thailand. In December 2023, in a similar manner to Star, Disney began to test a Hulu hub on Disney+ for subscribers in the United States that are subscribed to both services.

In March 2024, it was announced that the Star hub would be added on Disney+ in Latin America on 26 June 2024, while its separate platform, Star+, would be discontinued on 24 July of the same year.

=== Planned phase-out and shift towards Hulu ===
On 6 August 2025, after the completion of its acquisition of Comcast's stake in the service, Disney announced plans to fully migrate Hulu to the Disney+ platform in the United States. While Disney+ and Hulu will remain separate subscription products, their separate apps were to be replaced by a new "unified" platform in 2026. Concurrently, Disney also announced that it would replace Star with Hulu as its "global general entertainment brand". The launch officially occurred on 8 October.

== Content ==
Star Original logo used from 2021 to 2025.

=== General content ===
Star includes a range of content produced or otherwise owned by Disney and its subsidiaries, including television programs produced by ABC Signature, MTM Enterprises, Touchstone Television, 20th Television, 20th Television Animation, FXP, Freeform Studios, and their divisions and predecessors, as well as films from the 20th Century Studios, 20th Century Animation, Searchlight Pictures, Touchstone Pictures, and Hollywood Pictures libraries and some films from the Miramax Films library. Much of the TV content was originally produced for Disney-owned networks and services such as ABC, FX, and Freeform. Other programs were originally commissioned by third-party networks but have been made available on Star because Disney has retained the international distribution rights.

In Europe, Disney+ and Star offer local content from third-party distributors in addition to local in-house and co-productions. The reason for this is a regulation that requires a certain percentage of European productions. In order to comply with this requirement, Disney has entered into a partnership with various local distributors from France and Germany, among others. In Japan, besides Disney-owned contents, Star also provides anime series produced in the country.

==== Multi-year deal with Sony Pictures ====
In April 2021, Disney and Sony Pictures reached a multi-year deal to let Sony's titles stream on Hulu and Disney+ or premiered on Disney linear television, it also merged separated existing deal between Funimation (now Crunchyroll) and Hulu. While title begins to add on Hulu and Disney+ until September 2022, Marvel related titles starting with Spider-Man films added to Disney+'s Marvel hub in June 2022. This also included the animated Spider-Man: Into the Spider-Verse. All three Sam Raimi-directed Spider-Man films and The Amazing Spider-Man would eventually be made available on the American version of the platform on 21 April 2023, with Spider-Man: Homecoming and Venom, a film in Sony's Spider-Man Universe, being made available the following month. Other mature and non-Marvel related Sony Pictures titles that premiered on Disney's linear networks available on the Star hub (specifically from Sony Pictures Television) include ABC's The Good Doctor, For Life and Schooled, FX's Justified, Damages and Rescue Me and Hulu's Future Man (which is no longer available following the 26 May 2023 purge of Disney+ titles). Initially, non-Marvel related titles and Crunchyroll-licensed titles were only available on Hulu in the United States, and multiple titles started to be available on Disney+ in March 2024 through the Hulu on Disney+ hub.

=== Exclusive content ===
Many productions for which the local first release is carried out by Star are advertised and offered as Star Originals or Star Exclusives. Most of these productions come from the streaming services (such as Hulu) and TV channels (such as ABC, Freeform, FX, ESPN, or National Geographic) of the Walt Disney Company. Selected productions from its sister services Star+ and Disney+ Hotstar may come to Star, Disney+ original series and movies that are not labelled under Disney, Pixar, Marvel, Star Wars or National Geographic are also released to Star outside of the United States and Latin America but retain their Disney+ Originals status. Disney also has local partnerships with licensors and distributes selected productions worldwide. One Such partnership, for example is with the Japanese TV broadcaster TBS.

== Availability ==
Star has been exclusively available as part of Disney+ in Japan since 8 October 2025. It was previously available in numerous other countries outside of the United States before the Star brand was replaced with the Hulu brand.

Launch rollout timeline
Release date	Country/territory
23 February 2021–8 October 2025	Australia
23 February 2021–8 October 2025	Austria
23 February 2021–8 October 2025	Belgium
23 February 2021–8 October 2025	Canada
23 February 2021–8 October 2025	Denmark
23 February 2021–8 October 2025	Finland
23 February 2021–8 October 2025	France
23 February 2021–8 October 2025	French Guiana
23 February 2021–8 October 2025	French West Indies
23 February 2021–8 October 2025	Germany
23 February 2021–8 October 2025	Greenland
23 February 2021–8 October 2025	Guernsey
23 February 2021–8 October 2025	Iceland
23 February 2021–8 October 2025	Ireland
23 February 2021–8 October 2025	Isle of Man
23 February 2021–8 October 2025	Italy
23 February 2021–8 October 2025	Jersey
23 February 2021–8 October 2025	Luxembourg
23 February 2021–8 October 2025	Mauritius
23 February 2021–8 October 2025	Mayotte
23 February 2021–8 October 2025	Monaco
23 February 2021–8 October 2025	Netherlands
23 February 2021–8 October 2025	New Caledonia
23 February 2021–8 October 2025	New Zealand
23 February 2021–8 October 2025	Norway
23 February 2021–8 October 2025	Portugal
23 February 2021–8 October 2025	Réunion
23 February 2021–8 October 2025	Singapore
23 February 2021–8 October 2025	Spain
23 February 2021–8 October 2025	Sweden
23 February 2021–8 October 2025	Switzerland
23 February 2021–8 October 2025	United Kingdom
23 February 2021–8 October 2025	Wallis and Futuna
27 October 2021	Japan
12 November 2021–8 October 2025	South Korea
12 November 2021–8 October 2025	Taiwan
16 November 2021–8 October 2025	Hong Kong
18 May 2022–8 October 2025	South Africa
8 June 2022–8 October 2025	Algeria
8 June 2022–8 October 2025	Bahrain
8 June 2022–8 October 2025	Egypt
8 June 2022–8 October 2025	Iraq
8 June 2022–8 October 2025	Jordan
8 June 2022–8 October 2025	Kuwait
8 June 2022–8 October 2025	Lebanon
8 June 2022–8 October 2025	Libya
8 June 2022–8 October 2025	Morocco
8 June 2022–8 October 2025	Oman
8 June 2022–8 October 2025	Palestine
8 June 2022–8 October 2025	Qatar
8 June 2022–8 October 2025	Saudi Arabia
8 June 2022–8 October 2025	Tunisia
8 June 2022–8 October 2025	United Arab Emirates
8 June 2022–8 October 2025	Yemen
14 June 2022–8 October 2025	Åland
14 June 2022–8 October 2025	Albania
14 June 2022–8 October 2025	Andorra
14 June 2022–8 October 2025	Bosnia and Herzegovina
14 June 2022–8 October 2025	British Indian Ocean Territory
14 June 2022–8 October 2025	Bulgaria
14 June 2022–8 October 2025	Croatia
14 June 2022–8 October 2025	Czech Republic
14 June 2022–8 October 2025	Estonia
14 June 2022–8 October 2025	Faroe Islands
14 June 2022–8 October 2025	French Polynesia
14 June 2022–8 October 2025	French Southern and Antarctic Lands
14 June 2022–8 October 2025	Gibraltar
14 June 2022–8 October 2025	Greece (Note: The content hub is not visible due to the pre-existing Star Channel (Greece) and Star TV (Turkey). Yet, some of its original programming are available on the platform.)
14 June 2022–8 October 2025	Hungary
14 June 2022–8 October 2025	Kosovo
14 June 2022–8 October 2025	Latvia
14 June 2022–8 October 2025	Liechtenstein
14 June 2022–8 October 2025	Lithuania
14 June 2022–8 October 2025	Malta
14 June 2022–8 October 2025	Montenegro
14 June 2022–8 October 2025	North Macedonia
14 June 2022–8 October 2025	Pitcairn Islands
14 June 2022–8 October 2025	Poland
14 June 2022–8 October 2025	Romania
14 June 2022–8 October 2025	Saint Helena, Ascension and Tristan da Cunha
14 June 2022–8 October 2025	Saint Pierre and Miquelon
14 June 2022–8 October 2025	San Marino
14 June 2022–8 October 2025	Serbia
14 June 2022–8 October 2025	Sint Maarten
14 June 2022–8 October 2025	Slovakia
14 June 2022–8 October 2025	Slovenia
14 June 2022–8 October 2025	Svalbard and Jan Mayen
14 June 2022–8 October 2025	Turkey
14 June 2022–8 October 2025	Vatican City
16 June 2022–8 October 2025	Israel
17 November 2022–8 October 2025	Philippines
3 May 2023 (Note: Soft launch on Disney+ Hotstar streaming service)–8 October 2025	Indonesia
3 May 2023–8 October 2025	Malaysia
3 May 2023–8 October 2025	Thailand
26 June 2024–8 October 2025	Argentina
26 June 2024–8 October 2025	Bermuda
26 June 2024–8 October 2025	Bolivia
26 June 2024–8 October 2025	Brazil
26 June 2024–8 October 2025	Caribbean Netherlands
26 June 2024–8 October 2025	Chile
26 June 2024–8 October 2025	Colombia
26 June 2024–8 October 2025	Commonwealth Caribbean (Note: Per country-specific (menu-selectable) information on Disney+ Help Center.)
26 June 2024–8 October 2025	Costa Rica
26 June 2024–8 October 2025	Curaçao
26 June 2024–8 October 2025	Dominican Republic
26 June 2024–8 October 2025	Ecuador
26 June 2024–8 October 2025	El Salvador
26 June 2024–8 October 2025	Guatemala
26 June 2024–8 October 2025	Haiti
26 June 2024–8 October 2025	Honduras
26 June 2024–8 October 2025	Mexico
26 June 2024–8 October 2025	Nicaragua
26 June 2024–8 October 2025	Panama
26 June 2024–8 October 2025	Paraguay
26 June 2024–8 October 2025	Peru
26 June 2024–8 October 2025	Suriname
26 June 2024–8 October 2025	Uruguay
26 June 2024–8 October 2025	Venezuela
