= Star+ =

Defunct streaming service in Iberian America

- Logo for the Star+ service.
- Website type: OTT video streaming platform
- Available in: List: Spanish (Latin American); Portuguese (Brazilian)
- Dissolved: 26 June 2024; 2 years ago (merged with Disney+); 24 July 2024; 2 years ago (separated app)
- Area served: Ibero-America (except Cuba, see full list of countries)
- Parent: Disney Streaming
- Website: Archived official website at the Wayback Machine (archive index)
- Registration: Required
- Launched: 31 August 2021; 5 years ago

Star+ (Star Plus; stylized as ST★R+) was a short-lived subscription video on-demand over-the-top streaming service available in almost all Ibero-American states. The service was owned by The Walt Disney Company through the Disney Entertainment division and business segment.

The service featured television and film content from the libraries of Disney subsidiaries, including Star Originals, 20th Television, 20th Television Animation, Searchlight Television, 20th Century Studios, 20th Century Animation (films only), ABC Signature, Freeform, FX Networks, Hollywood Pictures, Hotstar, Hulu, National Geographic, Searchlight Pictures, Touchstone Pictures and many more, as well as a large amount of third party content from Sony Pictures, NBCUniversal and Paramount Global and live sports from ESPN.

Star+ content was merged into Disney+ on 26 June 2024 and the separate streaming platform was discontinued on 24 July of the same year.

== History ==
=== Pre-launch ===
The "Star" brand originated as a Hong Kong-based satellite broadcaster, which operated under that name as an acronym of "Satellite Television Asian Region." It was founded by Hutchison Whampoa in 1990, and was acquired by News Corporation in 1993. After 2009, the Star brand was mainly restricted to the now separately owned Star China Media, as well as Star India, which operates primarily in India but also distributes Indian vernacular TV programming worldwide and the remaining Asia Pacific rebranded from Star to then Fox International Channels' regional unit. Star India (as well as all of the now Fox Networks Group's Asia Pacific operations (Note: Although, the Asia Pacific operations do operate "Star"-branded TV services to date, to varying degrees. Not to be confused with the Japanese premium TV network of the same name, which albeit then a co-owned venture with three Japanese partners, is now a wholly separate business as the former 21st Century Fox sold its stake before the Disney acquisition completed.)) was then acquired by Walt Disney as part of its acquisition of 21st Century Fox on 20 March 2019.

During an earnings call on 5 August 2020, Disney CEO Bob Chapek announced that Disney planned to launch a new international, general entertainment service under the "Star" brand name in 2021. The plan superseded a previously announced international expansion of the majority-controlled American streaming service, Hulu, which has only expanded outside the United States to Japan. Chapek argued that the Hulu brand is not well known outside of the US, while Star is a much more recognizable brand outside of the United States.

=== Dispute with Lionsgate ===
In April 2021, Disney faced a trademark dispute in Brazil, Argentina and Mexico with Lionsgate's Starz Entertainment over the use of the Star brand in Ibero-America. The Wrap reported that Disney had five days to respond to the Brazil lawsuit. As a result, on 13 May 2021, it would be announced that the launch of Star+ in Ibero-America would be delayed to 31 August.

While Disney eventually won the dispute, in July, they would lose an appeal in court in Brazil to the name dispute with Lionsgate. In August 2021, Disney and Starz reached a settlement over the brand name issue allowing Star+ to launch in Ibero-America on 31 August as scheduled. The lawsuit was dropped after the deal was reached.

In June 2022, Disney and Lionsgate announced a streaming bundle offer in select Ibero-American countries, consisting of Disney+, Star+ and Lionsgate's Starzplay service.

On 28 September 2022, Lionsgate announced that its Starzplay service would rename to Lionsgate+ worldwide on the next day, including Ibero-America but excluding United States and Canada (where it is still known as Starz in those regions), as well as Cuba which completely ended the name conflict with Disney's Star+ service.

=== Merger with Disney+ ===
On 12 December 2023, The Walt Disney Company Latin America planned to close down Star+ platform, and then launch both the Star and ESPN hub onto Disney+ on 26 June 2024. The standalone Star+ app was originally planned to be discontinued on 30 June 2024; the date was later pushed to 24 July of that same year, with 26 June being the date of their merge. The announcement was left unnoticed for current Star+ subscribers until they dropped the short clip about it. (Note: after the full merger of both streaming services occoured, the short since then has been unavailable.)

== Content ==
Star+ served the same purpose as the Star content hub that was integrated into the Disney+ service in several other countries on 23 February 2021. The services hosted a variety of content from Disney's studios, primarily general entertainment content carried on Disney+, as well as live sports from ESPN.

=== Original programming ===
In addition to acquired content, Star+ produced original, local content in almost all Ibero-American states to be exclusively released on the platform.

=== Sports rights ===
==== American football ====
- National Football League
- College football
- XFL

==== Association football ====
Asia

- FIFA World Cup qualification (AFC)
- AFC Champions League
- AFC Asian Cup
- AFC Cup

Europe

- UEFA Champions League (except Mexico and Brazil)
- UEFA Europa League
- UEFA Europa Conference League
- UEFA Super Cup (except Mexico and Brazil)
- UEFA Nations League (except Mexico)
- UEFA European Qualifiers (except Mexico)
- UEFA Euro (except Mexico)

Belgium

- Belgian First Division A

England

- Premier League (only South America)
- EFL Championship
- EFL League One
- EFL League Two
- FA Cup
- FA Women's Cup
- EFL Cup
- FA Women's Super League (only South America)
- FA Community Shield
- FA Women's Community Shield

France

- Ligue 1
- Trophée des Champions

Germany

- Bundesliga (only South America)
- 2. Bundesliga (only South America)
- DFB-Pokal
- DFL-Supercup (only South America)

Italy

- Serie A
- Serie A Femminile
- Coppa Italia
- Coppa Italia (women)
- Supercoppa Italiana
- Supercoppa Italiana (women)

Netherlands

- Eredivisie

Portugal

- Liga Portugal (only Brazil)
- Taça de Portugal
- Taça da Liga

Scotland

- Scottish Premiership
- Scottish Cup
- Scottish League Cup

Spain

- La Liga (only South America)
- Segunda División (only South America)
- Copa del Rey (only Brazil)
- Copa de la Reina (only Brazil)
- Supercopa de España (only Brazil)
- Supercopa de España Femenina (only Brazil)

Turkey

- Süper Lig

South America

- Copa Libertadores
- Copa Sudamericana
- Recopa Sudamericana

Argentina

- Argentine Primera División (except Argentina)
- Supercopa Argentina (except Argentina)

Brazil

- Copa Nordeste (only Brazil)
- Campeonato Brasileiro Série A (except Brazil)
- Campeonato Brasileiro Série B (except Brazil)

Ecuador

- Ecuadorian Serie A

Peru

- Peruvian Primera División (except Peru)

Uruguay

- Uruguayan Primera División

North America

- CONCACAF Champions Cup (except Mexico)
- CONCACAF Central American Cup (except Mexico)
- CONCACAF Caribbean Cup (except Mexico)
- FIFA World Cup qualification (CONCACAF)
- CONCACAF Gold Cup

Mexico

- Liga MX (only Atlético de San Luis matches)
- Liga de Expansión
- Liga MX Femenil (only Atlético de San Luis matches)

United States

- USL Championship
- USL League One

==== Australian rules football ====
- Australian Football League

==== Motorsports ====
- Formula One (except Mexico and Brazil)
- FIA Formula 2 Championship (except Mexico and Brazil)
- FIA Formula 3 Championship (except Mexico and Brazil)
- Porsche Supercup (except Mexico and Brazil)
- Extreme E
- Dakar Rally
- IndyCar Series
- Indy NXT
- MotoGP
- Superbike World Championship (except Brazil)
- Supersport World Championship (except Brazil)
- Supersport 300 World Championship (except Brazil)
- F1 Academy (except Brazil)

==== Baseball ====
United States

- Major League Baseball
- College baseball

Mexico

- Mexican League

==== Basketball ====
United States

- National Basketball Association
- WNBA
- NCAA basketball
- NBA Summer League
- NBA G League
- The Basketball Tournament

Africa

- Basketball Africa League

Europe

- Liga ACB
- Copa del Rey de Baloncesto
- Euroleague (Mexico and Central America)

==== Boxing ====
- ESPN Knockout (includes Top Rank, Premier Boxing Champions and Bare Knuckle Fighting Championship)

==== Combat sport ====
- Ultimate Fighting Championship (except Brazil and Mexico)
  - Pay-per-view
  - Fight Nights
  - Dana White's Contender Series
- Bellator MMA (only Brazil)
- Lux Fight League

==== Cycling ====
- Tour de France
- Vuelta a España
- UCI Road World Championships (only South America)
- Tour Down Under
- Vuelta a San Juan
- Tour Colombia
- Paris–Nice
- Critérium du Dauphiné
- Tour de Romandie (only for South America)
- Tour of Utah (only for South America)
- Cadel Evans Great Ocean Road Race (only for South America)
- Paris–Roubaix
- Liège–Bastogne–Liège
- Amstel Gold Race
- La Flèche Wallonne
- Clásica de San Sebastián
- Grand Prix Cycliste de Québec (only for South America)
- Grand Prix Cycliste de Montréal (only for South America)

==== Field Hockey ====
- Men's FIH Hockey World Cup
- Euro Hockey League
- Metropolitano de Hockey (men)
- Women's FIH Hockey World Cup
- Women's Euro Hockey League
- Metropolitano de Hockey (women)

==== Golf ====
- The Masters
- PGA Championship
- U.S. Open
- The Open Championship
- PGA Tour

==== Hockey ====
- National Hockey League
- Svenska Hockeyligan

==== Polo ====
- Campeonato Argentino Abierto de Polo
- Campeonato Abierto de Hurlingham
- Campeonato Abierto del Tortugas Country Club
- U.S. Open Polo

==== Rugby ====
- The Rugby Championship
- Rugby World Cup
- Heineken Champions Cup
- EPCR Challenge Cup
- Súper Liga Americana de Rugby
- Torneo de la URBA

==== Table Tennis ====
- WTT Series

==== Tennis ====
- Australian Open
- French Open
- The Championships, Wimbledon (except Brazil)
- U.S. Open
- ATP Finals
- ATP Tour Masters 1000
- ATP Cup
- ATP Tour 500
- ATP Tour 250
- WTA Finals
- WTA 1000
- WTA 500
- WTA 250
- Next Generation ATP Finals
- Laver Cup

==== Volleyball ====
- CEV Champions League
- Volleyball Nations League
- Superlega

== Availability ==
Star+ was available for streaming via web browsers on PC and Mac, as well as apps on iOS and Apple TV, Android and Android TV, Fire TV and Fire HD, Chromecast, Roku, WebOS and Tizen OS devices among another digital media player and gaming consoles, such as PlayStation 4, PlayStation 5, Xbox One and Xbox Series X/S, as well as PC running Windows 10 and Windows 11.

Launch rollout timeline
Release date	Region	Country/territory
31 August 2021	North America	Costa Rica
31 August 2021	North America	Dominican Republic
31 August 2021	North America	El Salvador
31 August 2021	North America	Guatemala
31 August 2021	North America	Honduras
31 August 2021	North America	Mexico
31 August 2021	North America	Nicaragua
31 August 2021	North America	Panama
31 August 2021	South America	Argentina
31 August 2021	South America	Bolivia
31 August 2021	South America	Brazil
31 August 2021	South America	Chile
31 August 2021	South America	Colombia
31 August 2021	South America	Ecuador
31 August 2021	South America	Paraguay
31 August 2021	South America	Peru
31 August 2021	South America	Uruguay
31 August 2021	South America	Venezuela
