= List of programs broadcast by Freeform =

Freeform logo

This is a list of television shows carried by Freeform and its predecessors, CBN Satellite Network / CBN Cable Network, CBN Family Channel, The Family Channel, Fox Family and ABC Family.

== Original programming ==
=== Drama ===
Title	Genre	Premiere	Seasons	Length	Status
Coven Academy	Supernatural teen drama	October 1, 2026	1 season, 10 episodes	25–43 min	Renewed

=== Unscripted ===
==== Docuseries ====
Title	Subject	Premiere	Seasons	Length	Status
Somebody Knows Something	True crime	August 10, 2026	1 season, 8 episodes	40–42 min	Pending

==== Reality ====
Title	Genre	Premiere	Seasons	Length	Status
Love Thy Nader	Reality	August 26, 2025	1 season, 8 episodes	41–42 min	Renewed
That Thrifting Show with Lara Spencer	Reality competition	March 19, 2026	1 season, 12 episodes	42 min	Renewed
Million Dollar Nannies	Reality	June 17, 2026	1 season, 8 episodes	40–57 min	Pending
House of Stassi	Reality	July 29, 2026	1 season, 8 episodes	42–46 min	Pending

=== Continuations ===
Title	Genre	Prev. network	Premiere	Seasons	Length	Status
Project Runway (seasons 21–22)	Reality competition	Bravo (seasons 1–5, 17–20); Lifetime (seasons 6–16)	July 31, 2025	2 seasons, 18 episodes	42–45 min	Pending

== Syndicated programming ==
Title	Genre	Premiere
First-run
The 700 Club	Christian variety	April 29, 1977
Reruns
Boy Meets World	Sitcom	2004–2007; 2010–2015; 2024

== Former programming ==
=== Original ===
==== CBN era (1977–90) ====
Title	Premiere	Finale
NewSight	February 3, 1980	1992
Another Life	June 1, 1981	1985
American Baby	September 3, 1982	1998
The Flying House	October 3, 1982	December 30, 1988
Swiss Family Robinson	October 3, 1982	August 30, 1992
Superbook	October 8, 1982	September 8, 1990
Pat Boone, USA	August 20, 1984	1985
Honey, Honey	October 7, 1984	August 29, 1986
Leo the Lion	October 7, 1984	August 29, 1986
Doris Day's Best Friends	July 16, 1985	1988
Star's Table	June 30, 1986	1987
Crossbow	August 30, 1987	1990
Our Friends on Wooster Square	August 31, 1987	August 27, 1988
Gerbert	May 1, 1988	November 1, 1992
Rin Tin Tin: K-9 Cop	September 17, 1988	July 1, 1993
Bordertown	January 7, 1989	March 17, 1991
Something Else	September 3, 1989	1990
Wowser	September 4, 1989	September 7, 1990
Zorro	January 5, 1990	January 30, 1993
T. and T.	January 6, 1990	May 25, 1990
Healthy Kids	April 1, 1990	1998
Zak Tales	June 2, 1990	September 8, 1990
Big Brother Jake	September 2, 1990	February 13, 1994

==== The Family Channel era (1990–98) ====
Title	Premiere	Finale
The Adventures of the Black Stallion	September 15, 1990	May 16, 1993
Maniac Mansion	September 17, 1990	April 4, 1993
That's My Dog!	September 1, 1991	September 30, 1995
You Asked for It, Again	September 1, 1991	1992
Heroes on Hot Wheels	September 2, 1991	August 28, 1992
Heroes on Hot Wheels	May 30, 1994	August 26, 1994
The Legend of Prince Valiant	September 3, 1991	June 25, 1993
Amateur Hour	January 26, 1992	1992
Family Edition	May 24, 1992	1993
African Skies	October 11, 1992	April 23, 1994
Trivial Pursuit	June 7, 1993	December 30, 1994
Baby Races	September 12, 1993	August 27, 1994
Madeline	September 14, 1993	September 28, 1996
The Mighty Jungle	January 2, 1994	November 13, 1994
Boggle	March 7, 1994	November 18, 1994
Shuffle	March 7, 1994	June 10, 1994
Jumble	June 13, 1994	December 30, 1994
Masters of the Maze	August 29, 1994	September 22, 1996
Maximum Drive	August 29, 1994	November 25, 1994
Family Challenge	October 2, 1995	September 7, 1997
Wild Animal Games	October 2, 1995	September 22, 1996
Home & Family	April 1, 1996	August 14, 1998
Shop 'til You Drop	September 30, 1996	August 14, 1998
Shopping Spree	September 30, 1996	August 14, 1998
Small Talk	September 30, 1996	January 31, 1997
Wait 'til You Have Kids!!	September 30, 1996	January 31, 1997
It Takes Two	March 10, 1997	May 30, 1997

==== Fox Family era (1998–2001) ====
Title	Premiere	Finale
1990s
Fox Family Countdown	August 15, 1998	May 25, 2000
Bad Dog	August 15, 1998	January 2002
Monster Farm	August 15, 1998	December 1998
Outrageous!	August 15, 1998	1999
I Can't Believe You Said That!	August 15, 1998	1999
Show Me the Funny	August 15, 1998	2001
Ohh Nooo! Mr. Bill Presents	August 18, 1998	1999
All Dogs Go to Heaven: The Series	August 17, 1998	March 2000
The All-New Captain Kangaroo	August 17, 1998	June 1999
Mister Moose's Fun Time	August 17, 1998	January 1999
Magic Adventures of Mumfie	August 17, 1998	August 31, 2000
Life, Camera, Action	August 17, 1998	1999
Famous Families	October 5, 1998	1999
The New Addams Family	October 19, 1998	January 2002
Great Pretenders	October 31, 1998	July 2002
Big Wolf on Campus	April 2, 1999	April 27, 2002
The Wiggles	May 3, 1999	August 2000
Rotten Ralph	July 12, 1999	June 2001
I Was a Sixth Grade Alien!	July 19, 1999	November 2000
Storytime with Thomas	September 6, 1999	May 26, 2000
It's Itsy Bitsy Time	September 6, 1999	August 2002
World Gone Wild	September 10, 1999	2000
Angela Anaconda	October 4, 1999	November 29, 2001
Random Acts of Comedy	October 8, 1999	January 1, 2000
Weird-Ohs	October 9, 1999	March 15, 2000
The Kids from Room 402	October 9, 1999	January 2002
Mega Babies	October 10, 1999	June 2001
S Club 7 in Miami	November 6, 1999	February 5, 2000
2000s
Higher Ground	January 14, 2000	June 16, 2000
Fly Tales	February 2000	November 2000
Hello Kitty's Paradise	March 4, 2000	September 16, 2000
Flint the Time Detective	March 5, 2000	March 1, 2002
Paranoia	April 14, 2000	May 7, 2000
S Club 7 in L.A.	June 3, 2000	September 30, 2000
The Zack Files	September 17, 2000	March 2002
Monster Rancher (Note: Had been airing repeats since October 3, 1999 before airing premieres.)	September 17, 2000	March 1, 2002
The Fearing Mind	October 21, 2000	December 2, 2000
Real Scary Stories	October 21, 2000	September 2001
Scariest Places on Earth	October 23, 2000	October 29, 2006
Edgemont	January 4, 2001	August 2001
So Little Time (Note: Episodes 13 to 26 aired on ABC Family from December 1, 2001 to May 4, 2002.)	June 2, 2001	May 4, 2002
Braceface	June 2, 2001	October 10, 2003
State of Grace (Note: Season 2 aired on ABC Family.)	June 25, 2001	December 4, 2002
Moolah Beach	September 8, 2001	October 13, 2001
What's with Andy?	September 22, 2001	March 1, 2002
S Club 7 in Hollywood	September 29, 2001	January 26, 2002
Da Möb	November 3, 2001	March 9, 2002
Totally Spies!	November 3, 2001	September 13, 2002

==== ABC Family era (2001–16) ====
Title	Premiere	Finale
2000s
Medabots (Note: Had been airing repeats since March 4, 2002 before airing premieres.) (Note: Aired on the Action Block / Jetix.)	July 1, 2002	March 7, 2004
Beyblade	July 6, 2002	July 30, 2005
Shinzo	July 6, 2002	June 29, 2005
The Last Resort	August 11, 2002	March 31, 2003
Tokyo Pig	September 14, 2002	March 30, 2003
Viva S Club	September 21, 2002	December 14, 2002
My Life Is a Sitcom	January 27, 2003	March 10, 2004
The Brendan Leonard Show	May 26, 2003	October 3, 2003
Switched!	May 26, 2003	October 1, 2004
Dance Fever	July 13, 2003	August 24, 2003
Power Rangers Ninja Storm (Note: Aired simultaneously on ABC Kids.)	February 22, 2003	November 22, 2003
Beyblade V-Force	August 30, 2003	June 12, 2005
Daigunder	September 13, 2003	December 21, 2003
Knock First	October 6, 2003	October 1, 2004
Power Rangers Dino Thunder (Note: Aired simultaneously on Toon Disney's Jetix.)	February 14, 2004	November 20, 2004
Switched Up	March 7, 2004	April 18, 2004
Beyblade G-Revolution	September 18, 2004	June 12, 2005
Super Robot Monkey Team Hyperforce Go!	September 18, 2004	August 27, 2006
Dragon Booster	October 23, 2004	August 20, 2006
W.I.T.C.H.	January 15, 2005	August 27, 2006
Whose Line Is It Anyway?	January 17, 2005	December 15, 2007
Power Rangers S.P.D.	February 5, 2005	July 16, 2005
Las Vegas Garden of Love	March 21, 2005	May 9, 2005
Battle B-Daman	April 2, 2005	November 12, 2005
Wildfire	June 20, 2005	May 26, 2008
Brat Camp	July 13, 2005	August 24, 2005
Venus and Serena: For Real	July 20, 2005	August 17, 2005
Beautiful People	August 8, 2005	April 24, 2006
Kicked Out	August 24, 2005	October 12, 2005
Get Ed	September 24, 2005	August 27, 2006
Falcon Beach	January 5, 2006	March 30, 2007
A.T.O.M.	February 4, 2006	August 27, 2006
Power Rangers Mystic Force	February 25, 2006	August 27, 2006
Back on Campus	April 8, 2006	April 29, 2006
Ōban Star-Racers	June 5, 2006	August 27, 2006
Kyle XY	June 26, 2006	March 16, 2009
Three Moons Over Milford	August 6, 2006	September 24, 2006
Yin Yang Yo!	August 27, 2006	
Lincoln Heights	January 8, 2007	November 9, 2009
Greek	July 9, 2007	March 7, 2011
Slacker Cats	August 13, 2007	September 17, 2007
The Middleman	June 16, 2008	September 1, 2008
The Secret Life of the American Teenager	July 1, 2008	June 3, 2013
Roommates	March 23, 2009	May 4, 2009
Make It or Break It	June 22, 2009	May 14, 2012
10 Things I Hate About You	July 7, 2009	May 24, 2010
Ruby & the Rockits	July 21, 2009	September 22, 2009
2010s
Pretty Little Liars (Note: Season 6 (part 2) and season 7 aired on Freeform)	June 8, 2010	June 27, 2017
Huge	June 28, 2010	August 30, 2010
Melissa & Joey	August 17, 2010	August 5, 2015
Switched at Birth (Note: Season 5 aired on Freeform.)	June 6, 2011	April 11, 2017
The Nine Lives of Chloe King	June 14, 2011	August 16, 2011
State of Georgia	June 29, 2011	August 17, 2011
The Lying Game	August 15, 2011	March 12, 2013
Jane by Design	January 3, 2012	July 31, 2012
Bunheads	June 11, 2012	February 25, 2013
Baby Daddy (Note: Seasons 5 to 6 aired on Freeform.)	June 20, 2012	May 22, 2017
Beverly Hills Nannies	July 11, 2012	September 4, 2012
Twisted	March 19, 2013	April 1, 2014
Dancing Fools	May 29, 2013	July 5, 2013
The Fosters (Note: Season 3 (part 2) and seasons 4 to 5 aired on Freeform.)	June 3, 2013	June 6, 2018
The Vineyard	July 23, 2013	September 10, 2013
Spell-Mageddon	July 24, 2013	September 11, 2013
Ravenswood	October 22, 2013	February 4, 2014
Chasing Life	June 10, 2014	September 28, 2015
Mystery Girls	June 25, 2014	August 27, 2014
Young & Hungry (Note: Seasons 3 to 5 aired on Freeform.)	June 25, 2014	July 25, 2018
Freak Out	October 21, 2014	May 27, 2015
Stitchers (Note: Seasons 2 to 3 aired on Freeform.)	June 2, 2015	August 14, 2017
Becoming Us	June 8, 2015	August 10, 2015
Job or No Job	August 5, 2015	October 1, 2015
Next Step Realty: NYC	August 11, 2015	October 15, 2015
Startup U	August 11, 2015	October 15, 2015
Kevin from Work	August 12, 2015	October 7, 2015
Monica the Medium (Note: Season 2 aired on Freeform.)	August 25, 2015	June 27, 2016

==== Freeform era (2016–present) ====
Title	Premiere	Finale
2010s
Shadowhunters	January 12, 2016	May 6, 2019
Recovery Road	January 25, 2016	March 28, 2016
Guilt	June 13, 2016	August 22, 2016
Dead of Summer	June 28, 2016	August 30, 2016
Cheer Squad	August 22, 2016	September 7, 2016
The Letter	October 11, 2016	November 29, 2016
Ben and Lauren: Happily Ever After?	October 11, 2016	November 29, 2016
Beyond	January 2, 2017	March 22, 2018
The Twins: Happily Ever After?	March 20, 2017	May 8, 2017
Famous in Love	April 18, 2017	May 30, 2018
Truth & Iliza	May 2, 2017	June 6, 2017
The Bold Type	June 20, 2017	June 30, 2021
Grown-ish	January 3, 2018	May 22, 2024
Alone Together	January 10, 2018	August 29, 2018
Siren	March 29, 2018	May 28, 2020
Cloak & Dagger	June 7, 2018	May 30, 2019
Disney's Fairy Tale Weddings	June 11, 2018	July 16, 2018
Good Trouble	January 8, 2019	March 5, 2024
Pretty Little Liars: The Perfectionists	March 20, 2019	May 22, 2019
Wrap Battle	November 25, 2019	December 9, 2019
2020s
Party of Five	January 8, 2020	March 4, 2020
Everything's Gonna Be Okay	January 16, 2020	June 3, 2021
Motherland: Fort Salem	March 18, 2020	August 23, 2022
Love in the Time of Corona	August 22, 2020	August 23, 2020
Kal Penn Approves This Message	September 22, 2020	October 27, 2020
Cruel Summer	April 20, 2021	July 31, 2023
Single Drunk Female	January 20, 2022	May 10, 2023
The Deep End	May 18, 2022	June 8, 2022
Everything's Trash	July 13, 2022	September 7, 2022
Keep This Between Us	August 29, 2022	August 30, 2022
The Come Up	September 13, 2022	September 27, 2022
The Watchful Eye	January 30, 2023	March 27, 2023
Love Trip: Paris	February 14, 2023	March 7, 2023
Praise Petey	July 21, 2023	August 18, 2023
Chrissy & Dave Dine Out	January 24, 2024	February 21, 2024
Grand Cayman: Secrets in Paradise	April 9, 2024	May 14, 2024
Royal Rules of Ohio	May 15, 2024	July 17, 2024
Sasha Reid and the Midnight Order	July 9, 2024	August 6, 2024
Wayne Brady: The Family Remix	July 24, 2024	September 11, 2024
Scam Goddess	January 15, 2025	February 19, 2025
How I Escaped My Cult	February 20, 2025	April 17, 2025
Not Her First Rodeo	May 22, 2025	June 5, 2025
Born to Be Viral: The Real Lives of Kidfluencers	June 23, 2025	July 7, 2025

=== Syndicated ===
==== 1977–98 ====
===== Live-action =====
Title	Started	Ended
The $50,000 Pyramid	1982	1982
Alias Smith and Jones	1983	1984
Alias Smith and Jones	1987	1988
Backstage at the Zoo	July 6, 1991	March 27, 1993
Bachelor Father	1982	1985
Batman	July 24, 1989	December 25, 1991
Batman	June 1, 1992	September 7, 1992
Beauty and the Beast	1990	1991
Ben Casey	1984	1986
The Best of Groucho	1984	1988
The Big Valley	1986	1998
The Bill Cosby Show	1984	1988
Blockbusters	1984	1985
Blondie	1983	1985
Boogies Diner	October 7, 1995	September 28, 1996
Boogies Diner	April 5, 1997	June 28, 1997
Bonanza	1988	1998
Branded	1985	1988
Break the Bank (Joe Farago-hosted episodes only)	1986	1986
The Bugaloos	October 5, 1996	March 29, 1997
Bullseye	1982	1984
Butterfly Island	1987	1988
Call of the West	1983	1985
The Campbells	1987	1990
Card Sharks	1984	1985
Carol Burnett and Friends	1996	1998
Carson's Comedy Classics	1996	1997
Chain Reaction	March 29, 1982	May 4, 1984
Christy	1996	1998
The Cisco Kid	1983	1986
The Courtship of Eddie's Father	1985	1987
Crazy Like a Fox	1987	1988
Daktari	1985	1986
Diagnosis: Murder	1997	1998
Evening Shade	1994	1995
Face the Music	1984	1986
Face the Music	1995	1995
The Farmer's Daughter	1985	1989
Far Out Space Nuts	October 6, 1996	March 23, 1997
Father Dowling Mysteries	1991	1996
Father Knows Best	1986	1993
Flipper	1984	1986
The Flying Nun (Note: Later aired on the Fox Family Channel or its successors.)	1986	1989
Gentle Ben	1984	1988
The George Burns and Gracie Allen Show	1982	1985
Go	1985	1986
The Gospel Bill Show	1987	1989
Green Acres	1985	1989
The Guns of Will Sonnett	1986	1987
Gunsmoke	1987	1995
Happy Days	1989	1990
Hardcastle and McCormick	1986	1987
Hardcastle and McCormick	1989	1990
Hardcastle and McCormick	1996	1997
Hazel	1986	1990
Hawaii Five-O	1997	1998
Here Come the Brides	1984	1989
Hey Vern, It's Ernest!	September 5, 1992	March 27, 1994
The High Chaparral	1994	1998
Highway to Heaven	1995	1997
H.R. Pufnstuf	October 5, 1996	March 29, 1997
I Married Joan	1982	1986
I Spy	1982	1985
I'm Telling!	September 9, 1989	September 8, 1990
I'm Telling!	August 29, 1994	August 28, 1996
Iron Horse	1987	1988
The Jack Benny Program	1982	1988
Jack Hanna's Animal Adventures	February 3, 1997	August 9, 1998
Judge Roy Bean	1982	1983
Kids Incorporated	September 22, 1985	August 31, 1986
Kidsworld	January 2, 1988	December 16, 1989
Laramie	1984	1987
Laredo	1984	1988
Laverne & Shirley	1989	1990
Let's Make a Deal	1982	1984
Let's Make a Deal	1993	1996
Lidsville	October 5, 1996	March 29, 1997
The Life and Legend of Wyatt Earp	1982	1985
Life Goes On	1992	1995
The Life of Riley	1982	1984
The Lone Ranger	1984	1990
Love That Bob	1983	1986
The Man from U.N.C.L.E.	1985	1986
The Many Loves of Dobie Gillis	1983	1988
Medical Center	1985	1988
My Little Margie	1982	1986
My Three Sons	1992	1993
Name That Tune	1985	1986
Name That Tune	1993	1996
The New Generation	September 9, 1989	September 8, 1990
The New Treasure Hunt	1983	1984
Newhart	1995	1996
Our House	1988	1991
The Paper Chase	1987	1989
Paradise	1996	1997
The Patty Duke Show	1985	1989
Please Don't Eat the Daisies	1985	1987
Punky Brewster	October 3, 1993	September 20, 1996
Remington Steele	1987	1989
Remington Steele	1996	1997
Rescue 911	1993	1998
The Rifleman	1983	1998
Romper Room and Friends	September 21, 1981	September 27, 1985
The Roy Rogers Show	1988	1989
Scarecrow and Mrs. King	1990	1991
Shamu TV	May 25, 1996	July 27, 1996
Sigmund and the Sea Monsters	October 5, 1996	March 29, 1997
Sky King	1988	1989
Snowy River: The McGregor Saga	1993	1996
Split Second	1993	1995
Startime	1982	1983
Tic-Tac-Dough	1982	1986
The Three Stooges	1996	1998
The Virginian	1989	1993
Wagon Train	1982	1992
The Waltons	1991	1998
Wendy and Me	1985	1986
The Westerner	1982	1984
Xuxa	September 12, 1994	February 16, 1996
The Young Riders	1992	1996

===== Animation =====
Title	Started	Ended
ALF: The Animated Series	September 2, 1991	August 28, 1992
The All New Popeye Hour	September 14, 1990	September 29, 1996
Augie Doggie & Friends	July 1, 1991	September 11, 1993
Babar	September 12, 1993	November 20, 1994
Captain N: The Game Master	September 15, 1991	September 5, 1993
Davey and Goliath	1984	1987
Dinosaucers	September 4, 1989	August 30, 1991
The Flintstone Kids	October 15, 1990	June 3, 1994
The Get Along Gang	September 10, 1989	September 9, 1990
Heathcliff and Marmaduke	October 20, 1990	August 31, 1991
Heathcliff (1984)	September 6, 1993	February 16, 1996
Hello Kitty's Furry Tale Theater	September 9, 1989	September 8, 1990
Inch High, Private Eye	1984	1985
Inspector Gadget	August 31, 1992	September 29, 1995
Le Piaf	June 1988	November 1996
Little Clowns of Happytown	September 10, 1989	September 9, 1990
The Littles	September 4, 1989	December 31, 1993
Maple Town	September 4, 1989	September 7, 1990
Mario All Stars (Note: An umbrella name for The Super Mario Bros. Super Show! and Super Mario World.)	September 3, 1994	September 28, 1996
The New Archies	September 7, 1991	March 27, 1994
Pole Position	September 10, 1989	June 30, 1991
Popeye and Son	September 3, 1994	December 31, 1995
ProStars	September 5, 1992	March 27, 1994
Rainbow Brite	September 9, 1989	October 7, 1989
The Roman Holidays	1984	1985
Roger Ramjet	September 4, 1989	December 24, 1989
Rupert	September 6, 1993	December 23, 1994
The Space Kidettes and Young Samson	1984	1985
Starcom: The U.S. Space Force	September 10, 1989	September 9, 1990
Starcom: The U.S. Space Force	September 12, 1993	December 26, 1993
Super Dave: Daredevil for Hire	June 11, 1994	September 24, 1994
Super Mario Bros. (Note: An umbrella name for The Super Mario Bros. Super Show!, The Adventures of Super Mario Bros. 3, and Super Mario World.)	September 13, 1991	August 28, 1994
Sylvanian Families	September 5, 1989	September 8, 1990
Valley of the Dinosaurs	1984	1985
Wheelie and the Chopper Bunch	1984	1985
Wish Kid	September 5, 1992	September 28, 1996
The World of Peter Rabbit and Friends	March 29, 1993	April 12, 1998

==== 1998–2001 ====
Title	Started	Ended
The Adventures of Shirley Holmes	August 15, 1998	November 1998
The Adventures of Shirley Holmes	March 1999	September 1999
Donkey Kong Country	August 15, 1998	August 2001
Eekstravaganza	August 15, 1998	April 1999
Pee-wee's Playhouse	August 15, 1998	September 1999
Spellbinder: Land of the Dragon Lord	August 15, 1998	November 1998
The Three Friends and Jerry (Note: An umbrella name for The Three Friends and Jerry, Freaky Stories, Stickin' Around, and Gogs.)	August 15, 1998	February 2000
Walter Melon	August 15, 1998	July 1999
Spider-Man (1994) (Note: Later aired later on ABC Family.)	August 16, 1998	March 1999
Spider-Man (1994)	July 1999	September 1999
Bobby's World	August 17, 1998	October 1999
Bobby's World	February 2000	June 2000
Bobby's World	November 2000	June 2001
Camp Candy	August 17, 1998	October 1999
Camp Candy	February 2000	June 2000
Camp Candy	November 2000	June 2001
Creepy Crawlers	August 17, 1998	July 1999
Dennis the Menace	August 17, 1998	September 1999
The Harveytoons Show	August 17, 1998	March 1999
Heathcliff (1984) (Note: Previously aired on The Family Channel or its predecessors.)	August 17, 1998	December 1998
Heathcliff (1984)	June 1999	August 1999
The Real Ghostbusters	August 17, 1998	September 1999
Shining Time Station	August 17, 1998	September 3, 1999
The Spooktacular New Adventures of Casper	August 17, 1998	September 1999
Animal Crackers	August 22, 1998	March 1999
Enigma	August 22, 1998	July 1999
Where on Earth Is Carmen Sandiego?	August 22, 1998	September 1999
The Why Why Family	August 22, 1998	March 1999
Eerie, Indiana: The Other Dimension	August 23, 1998	November 1998
Eerie, Indiana: The Other Dimension	August 1999	September 1999
Attack of the Killer Tomatoes	August 23, 1998	March 1999
Mr. Bogus	August 23, 1998	November 1998
Peter Pan and the Pirates	August 23, 1998	March 1999
Mork & Mindy	September 9, 1998	1999
The Mouse and the Monster	September 19, 1998	December 1998
Mr. Bean	December 7, 1998	1999
The Bradys	January 1, 1999	2000
The Partridge Family	1999	2000
St. Bear's Dolls Hospital	1999	1999
Sweet Valley High	November 1998	June 1999
Sweet Valley High	Fall 2003	Fall 2003
Dino Babies	January 25, 1999	1999
The Mr. Potato Head Show	March 7, 1999	September 1999
Space Goofs	March 7, 1999	August 1999
Toonsylvania	March 7, 1999	September 1999
Radio Active	April 2, 1999	October 1999
The World of Peter Rabbit and Friends	April 4, 1999	April 23, 2000
Oggy and the Cockroaches	May 2, 1999	September 1999
The Adventures of Mary-Kate & Ashley	June 17, 1999	March 2002
The Mask: Animated Series	June 21, 1999	September 1999
Back to Sherwood	July 17, 1999	September 1999
Mega Man	July 18, 1999	September 2001
Ripley's Believe It or Not!: The Animated Series	July 18, 1999	January 2000
Who's the Boss?	September 6, 1999	2003
Jellabies	September 6, 1999	2001
Life with Louie	September 6, 1999	February 2000
Digimon	October 3, 1999	August 31, 2001
Two of a Kind	October 11, 1999	2005
Goosebumps	October 19, 1999	October 1999
Goosebumps	June 2000	September 2001
My So-Called Life	January 21, 2000	2000
Early Edition	May 2000	2001
Providence	August 2000	2001
Freaks and Geeks	August 29, 2000	2001
Freaks and Geeks	2002	2002
Weird Science	January 6, 2001	September 2001
Step by Step	March 12, 2001	2010
Roswell Conspiracies: Aliens, Myths and Legends	June 2001	July 2001
Garfield and Friends	September 4, 2001	January 2002
Inspector Gadget	September 4, 2001	January 2002
Growing Pains	September 10, 2001	2003
The Wonder Years	November 5, 2001	2004

==== 2002–present ====
Title	Started	Ended
America's Funniest Home Videos (Fuentes and Fugelsang)	2002	2006
3rd Rock from the Sun	2002	2006
Whose Line Is It Anyway?	January 7, 2002	2010
Spider-Man (1994) (Note: Previously aired on Fox Family.) (Note: Aired on the Action Block / Jetix.)	March 2, 2002	May 28, 2006
Fantastic Four	March 2, 2002	June 21, 2003
Fantastic Four	June 18, 2005	July 9, 2005
Iron Man	March 2, 2002	June 21, 2003
X-Men	March 2, 2002	August 31, 2002
X-Men	July 18, 2004	June 5, 2005
X-Men	January 8, 2006	January 15, 2006
Best of Power Rangers / Power Rangers Generations (Note: An umbrella name for Mighty Morphin Power Rangers, Power Rangers Zeo, Power Rangers Turbo, Power Rangers in Space, Power Rangers Lost Galaxy, and Power Rangers Lightspeed Rescue.)	March 3, 2002	August 31, 2006
Power Rangers Time Force	March 4, 2002	May 23, 2002
Digimon (Note: An umbrella name for Digimon Adventure, Adventure 02, Tamers, and Frontier.)	March 4, 2002	August 30, 2002
Digimon	September 6, 2003	August 20, 2006
Power Rangers Wild Force	March 8, 2002	June 13, 2003
The Flying Nun (Note: Previously aired on The Family Channel or its predecessors.)	March 24, 2002	2002
Gidget	March 24, 2002	2002
Spider-Man (1967)	May 25, 2002	May 27, 2002
Spider-Man (1967)	June 27, 2004	July 3, 2004
Big Guy and Rusty the Boy Robot	July 6, 2002	September 1, 2002
The Incredible Hulk	July 6, 2002	August 31, 2003
The Incredible Hulk	June 21, 2005	July 26, 2005
Spider-Man and His Amazing Friends	July 6, 2002	May 31, 2006
Spider-Man Unlimited	July 6, 2002	November 9, 2002
Galidor: Defenders of the Outer Dimension	September 14, 2002	August 31, 2003
NASCAR Racers	September 14, 2002	August 27, 2006
7th Heaven	September 16, 2002	2008
7th Heaven	April 12, 2010	2010
Life with Bonnie	September 28, 2002	2002
Hang Time	May 26, 2003	2003
Family Matters	September 2003	February 29, 2008
Wallace & Gromit's Cracking Contraptions	April 9, 2003	March 29, 2006
Full House	December 1, 2003	December 4, 2013
Gargoyles	March 13, 2004	September 4, 2004
Gilmore Girls	October 4, 2004	2018
Smallville	October 4, 2004	2007
The Tick	June 19, 2005	November 5, 2005
Kong: The Animated Series	September 24, 2005	August 31, 2006
The Hogan Family	September 25, 2006	2006
Grounded for Life	September 26, 2005	December 4, 2013
The Dukes of Hazzard	September 2, 2006	2006
Sabrina, the Teenage Witch	October 2, 2006	2011
Everwood	October 2, 2006	February 6, 2007
America's Funniest Home Videos (Saget)	September 13, 2006	October 29, 2010
Sister, Sister	June 12, 2007	October 29, 2010
8 Simple Rules	June 12, 2007	December 3, 2014
What I Like About You	January 20, 2008	December 30, 2012
That '70s Show	July 4, 2008	December 30, 2012
My Wife and Kids	September 1, 2008	December 3, 2014
The Fresh Prince of Bel-Air	September 6, 2008	December 3, 2014
Friday Night Lights	September 7, 2010	2010
Still Standing	September 7, 2010	December 3, 2014
Reba	August 6, 2012	July 27, 2019
The Middle	September 9, 2013	August 22, 2022
Buffy the Vampire Slayer	June 22, 2015	December 2, 2015
Dawson's Creek	June 22, 2015	December 2, 2015
Last Man Standing	September 28, 2015	November 28, 2018
The Mindy Project	October 3, 2016	November 30, 2016
The Nanny	April 30, 2018	September 28, 2018
How I Met Your Mother	July 1, 2018	September 28, 2018
Fresh Off the Boat	October 1, 2018	December 19, 2018
Family Guy	April 17, 2019	September 27, 2024
The Simpsons	October 2, 2019	September 27, 2024
High School Musical: The Musical: The Series	November 8, 2019	2019
Superstore	January 6, 2020	February 8, 2020
High Fidelity	March 16, 2020	2020
Black-ish	July 5, 2021	September 12, 2025
The Office	January 1, 2022	September 22, 2023
How I Met Your Father	April 25, 2023	May 23, 2023
Scrubs	February 25, 2026	
According to Jim	October 1, 2025	October 1, 2026

===== Programming from Disney Channel =====
====== Animated ======
Title	Premiere date	End date	Source(s)
Phineas and Ferb	December 18, 2009		
Fish Hooks	January 15, 2011	February 2011	
Kim Possible	May 2, 2016	May 26, 2016	

====== Live-action ======
Title	Premiere date	End date	Source(s)
The Famous Jett Jackson	December 27, 2003	January 25, 2004	
Even Stevens	December 29, 2014	2016	
That's So Raven	December 29, 2014	2016	
Hannah Montana	December 29, 2014	May 2, 2016	

== Programming blocks ==
=== Current programming blocks ===
Title	Premiere date	Occurrence
Weekly
Funday	2016	Sunday afternoons
Seasonal
25 Days of Christmas	December 1, 1996	December 1–25
31 Nights of Halloween	October 19, 1998	October 1–31
30 Days of Disney	2019	June 1–30 and November 1–30

=== Former programming blocks ===
Title	Premiere date	End date
Fun Town	September 4, 1989	July 17, 1992
The Positive Place	1991	1994
Fam TV	1992	1996
Fam TV: The World of Sid & Marty Krofft	1996	1997
Cable Health Club & the Game Channel
Saturday Western Roundup	1996	1998
Sofa TV	1996	1998
Weekend Chill Saturday/Fox Family Saturday Morning	August 15, 1998	2000
The Basement	August 15, 1998	1999
Weekend Chill Sunday/Fox Family Sunday Morning	August 16, 1998	2000
Toon-a-Casserole	August 16, 1998	1999
Morning Scramble/Fox Family Mornings	August 17, 1998	2000
Captain Kangaroo's Treasure House	August 17, 1998	1999
Friday Double Feature	1998	1999
Friday Night Fever	1999	
Made in Japan	1999	2001
ABC Family Action Block / Jetix	March 2, 2002	September 3, 2006
The XYZ	March 2003	2003
Campus Crush/Summer Crush	August 1, 2009	August 9, 2013
MAMAlicious Week	May 12, 2012	May 20, 2012
New Comedy Wednesdays	August 2012	2016
Spring Crush	April 18, 2013	April 20, 2014
That's So Throwback	December 30, 2014	October 1, 2016
3–Day Disney Weekends (Note: Originally 30 Days of Disney in 2019)	September 1, 2019	September 27, 2020
Family Guy Fridays	January 3, 2020	April 26, 2024
LOVE Week (Note: Originally LOVE However the FF You Want in 2020)	February 8, 2020	February 14, 2021
