= List of Star (Disney+) original programming =

Star is a hub within the Disney+ streaming service for television and film content. Star first launched on February 23, 2021, in several countries outside of the United States, before expanding to other countries over time. Programs released exclusively on Star were branded as "Star Originals". Content from Disney-owned networks such as Hulu, ABC, and FX, along with other Disney-owned programming, would premiere exclusively on Star internationally. Star would also produce original local content exclusively for the platform.

On August 6, 2025, Disney announced plans to discontinue the Star brand as a Disney+ content hub beginning on October 8, 2025, and to extend the Hulu branding internationally as a replacement. Earlier in May 2025, Canada was among the first to replace the "Star Originals" branding with "Hulu Originals on Disney+". Japan is the only market in which the Star branding has been retained, as the Hulu brand there is owned by Nippon Television.

== Original programming ==
Star was not rebranded in Japan and these shows continue to be branded as Star Originals in the country.

Title	Genre	Premiere	Seasons	Runtime	Status
Cat's Eye	Action crime anime	September 26, 2025	1 season, 12 episodes	23 min	Pending
The One Shot	Comedy reality competition	August 12, 2026	1 season, 8 episodes	48–55 min	Pending

== Upcoming programming ==
Title	Genre	Premiere	Seasons	Runtime	Status
Night Tales Club	Horror anthology	January 2027	1 season, 6 episodes	TBA	Filming
Death Stranding Isolations	Science fiction adventure anime	2027	TBA	TBA	In production

== Former programming ==
These shows branded "Star Originals" have either completed their runs or stopped producing episodes in their original country. A show is also assumed to have ended if there has been no confirmed news of renewal at least one year after the show's last episode was released.

=== Drama ===
Title	Genre	Premiere	Seasons	Runtime	Exclusive region(s)	Notes
The Clearing	Psychological thriller	May 24, 2023	8 episodes	45–52 min	All markets	(Note: Miniseries)
Culprits	Heist thriller / dark comedy	November 8, 2023	8 episodes	48–58 min	All markets	
Faraway Downs	Historical drama	November 26, 2023	6 episodes	24–49 min	All markets	
The Artful Dodger	Historical heist drama	November 29, 2023 (Note: Australia and New Zealand); January 17, 2024 (Note: United Kingdom and Ireland)	1 season, 8 episodes	41–49 min	All markets	(Note: Star (Disney+) was rebranded as Hulu before additional seasons could premiere.)
Shardlake	Historical mystery	May 1, 2024	1 season, 4 episodes	45–54 min	All markets	
Rivals	Drama	October 18, 2024	1 season, 8 episodes	48–61 min	All markets	
A Thousand Blows	Historical sports drama	February 21, 2025	1 season, 6 episodes	47–55 min	All markets	
The Stolen Girl	Thriller	April 16, 2025	5 episodes	40–50 min	All markets	
Suspect: The Shooting of Jean Charles de Menezes	True crime drama	April 30, 2025	4 episodes	41–59 min	All markets	

=== Comedy ===
Title	Genre	Premiere	Seasons	Runtime	Exclusive region(s)	Notes
Wedding Season	Romantic comedy thriller	September 8, 2022	1 season, 8 episodes	30–41 min	All markets	
Extraordinary	Superhero comedy	January 25, 2023	2 seasons, 16 episodes	27–32 min	All markets	
Last Days of the Space Age	Comedy drama	October 2, 2024	8 episodes	32–46 min	All markets	

=== Unscripted ===
==== Docuseries ====
Title	Subject	Premiere	Seasons	Runtime	Exclusive region(s)	Notes
Coleen Rooney: The Real Wagatha Story	Scandal	October 18, 2023	3 episodes	45–49 min	All markets	
Brawn: The Impossible Formula 1 Story	Sports	November 15, 2023	4 episodes	57–61 min	All markets	
Camden	Music	May 29, 2024 (Note: All other territories); February 26, 2025 (Note: Brazil) (Note: Latin America)	4 episodes	43–52 min	All markets	
In Vogue: The 1990s	Fashion/publishing	September 13, 2024	6 episodes	43–50 min	All markets	
Sneaker Wars: Adidas v Puma	Fashion industry	September 24, 2025	3 episodes	41–42 min	All markets	

=== Non-English language ===
==== Dutch ====
Title	Genre	Premiere	Seasons	Runtime	Exclusive region(s)	Notes
That One Word – Feyenoord	Sports docuseries	September 1, 2021	1 season, 9 episodes	51–66 min	All markets	
Nemesis	Crime thriller	October 16, 2024	8 episodes	40–55 min	Selected territories	

==== French ====
Title	Genre	Premiere	Seasons	Runtime	Exclusive region(s)	Status
Oussekine	Drama	May 11, 2022	4 episodes	55–65 min	All markets	
Soprano: Sing or Die	Music biography docuseries	June 15, 2022	1 season, 6 episodes	35 min	All markets	
The French Mans	Action comedy	October 19, 2022	2 seasons, 10 episodes	30 min	All markets	
Lambert vs. Lambert: Over His Dead Body	Patients' rights docuseries	May 10, 2023	4 episodes	38–46 min	All markets	
Irresistible	Romantic comedy	September 20, 2023	6 episodes	25–24 min	Selected territories	
Everything Is Fine	Comedy drama	November 15, 2023	8 episodes	52 min	Selected territories	
Becoming Karl Lagerfeld	Biopic	June 7, 2024; August 7, 2024	6 episodes	38–49 min	All markets	
The Disappearance of Kimmy Diore	Drama thriller	October 23, 2024	6 episodes	33–46 min	All markets	

==== German ====
Title	Genre	Premiere	Seasons	Runtime	Exclusive region(s)	Notes
Sam: A Saxon	Biographical drama	April 26, 2023	7 episodes	43–61 min	All markets	
Farm Rebellion	Docuseries	June 14, 2023	6 episodes	46–51 min	All markets	
The Interpreter of Silence	Drama	November 15, 2023	5 episodes	56–63 min	Selected territories	
Pauline	Supernatural coming-of-age drama	May 22, 2024	6 episodes	37–43 min	Selected territories	
Call My Agent Berlin	Comedy drama	September 12, 2025	1 season, 10 episodes	39–47 min	Selected territories	
Habibi Baba Boom	Comedy drama	October 1, 2025	8 episodes	32–39 min	Selected territories	

==== Italian ====
Title	Genre	Premiere	Seasons	Runtime	Exclusive region(s)	Notes
The Ignorant Angels	Romantic drama	April 13, 2022	8 episodes	41–60 min	All markets	
The Good Mothers	Crime drama	April 5, 2023	6 episodes	56–60 min	All markets	
The Lions of Sicily	Romantic drama	October 25, 2023	8 episodes	52–58 min	Selected territories	
Raffa	Biographical docuseries	December 27, 2023	3 episodes	57–62 min	Selected territories	
This Is Not Hollywood	True crime drama	October 30, 2024	4 episodes	60 min	Selected territories	

==== Japanese ====
Title	Genre	Premiere	Seasons	Runtime	Exclusive region(s)	Notes
Because We Forget Everything	Mystery comedy	September 14, 2022	10 episodes	26–37 min	All markets	
The Tatami Time Machine Blues	Science fiction mystery comedy anime	September 14, 2022	6 episodes	21 min	All markets	
Gannibal	Mystery horror thriller	December 28, 2022	2 seasons, 15 episodes	33–59 min	All markets	
A Town Without Seasons	Family drama	August 9, 2023	10 episodes	25–28 min	Selected territories	
Phoenix: Eden17	Science fiction fantasy anime	September 13, 2023	4 episodes	18–29 min	All markets	
Dragons of Wonderhatch	Hybrid live-action / anime fantasy	December 20, 2023	8 episodes	33–46 min	All markets	
Sand Land: The Series	Science fiction adventure comedy anime	March 20, 2024	1 season, 13 episodes	24 min	All markets	
House of the Owl	Political drama	April 24, 2024	10 episodes	34–50 min	All markets	
Land of Tanabata	Science fiction mystery thriller	July 4, 2024	10 episodes	44–61 min	All markets	
Bullet/Bullet	Fantasy action anime	July 16, 2025	12 episodes	25 min	All markets	

==== Korean ====
Title	Genre	Premiere	Seasons	Runtime	Exclusive region(s)	Notes
Outrun by Running Man	Variety show	November 12, 2021 (Note: Asian territories); March 2, 2022	1 season, 14 episodes	9–56 min	All markets	
Rookie Cops	Coming-of-age police procedural comedy drama	January 26, 2022	16 episodes	53–63 min	All markets	
Grid	Mystery techno-thriller	February 16, 2022	10 episodes	50–55 min	All markets	
Soundtrack #1	Musical romantic drama	March 23, 2022	4 episodes	40–55 min	All markets (Note: Released in the United States as Disney+ Original series.)	
Kiss Sixth Sense	Romantic fantasy drama	May 25, 2022	12 episodes	62–73 min	All markets	
The Zone: Survival Mission	Reality game show	September 8, 2022	3 seasons, 24 episodes	54–73 min	All markets	
May It Please the Court	Legal drama	September 21, 2022	12 episodes	57–79 min	All markets	
Pink Lie	Dating show	October 5, 2022	1 season, 12 episodes	72–115 min	All markets	
Shadow Detective	Crime thriller	October 26, 2022	2 seasons, 16 episodes	49–62 min	All markets	
Revenge of Others	Coming-of-age mystery thriller	November 9, 2022	12 episodes	58–63 min	All markets	
Connect	Fantasy crime thriller	December 7, 2022	6 episodes	36–46 min	All markets	
Big Bet	Crime drama	December 21, 2022	2 seasons, 16 episodes	49–58 min	All markets	
Super Junior: The Last Man Standing	Music docuseries	January 18, 2023	2 episodes	49–50 min	All markets	
Call It Love	Revenge melodrama	February 22, 2023	16 episodes	71–73 min	All markets	
Full Count	Sports docuseries	April 26, 2023	10 episodes	41–66 min	All markets	
RACE	Workplace drama	May 10, 2023	12 episodes	53–63 min	All markets	
Moving	Science fiction action thriller	August 9, 2023	1 season, 20 episodes	38–58 min	All markets	
NCT 127: The Lost Boys	Music docuseries	August 30, 2023	4 episodes	34–38 min	Selected territories	
Han River Police	Action comedy	September 13, 2023	6 episodes	47–53 min	All markets	
The Worst of Evil	Crime drama	September 27, 2023	12 episodes	52–69 min	All markets	
Vigilante	Action thriller	November 8, 2023	1 season, 8 episodes	42–54 min	All markets	
Soundtrack #2	Musical romantic drama	December 6, 2023	6 episodes	41–46 min	All markets	
A Shop for Killers	Action drama	January 17, 2024	1 season, 8 episodes	44–62 min	All markets	
The Impossible Heir	Revenge workplace thriller	February 28, 2024	12 episodes	51–65 min	All markets	
Blood Free	Science fiction mystery thriller	April 10, 2024	10 episodes	46–50 min	All markets	
Uncle Samsik	Historical drama	May 15, 2024	16 episodes	44–46 min	All markets	
Red Swan	Revenge drama	July 3, 2024	10 episodes	49–57 min	All markets	
The Tyrant	Action thriller	August 14, 2024	4 episodes	37–51 min	All markets	
Seoul Busters	Crime comedy	September 11, 2024	20 episodes	42–58 min	All markets	
Gangnam B-Side	Crime drama	November 6, 2024	8 episodes	42–49 min	All markets	
Light Shop	Mystery horror	December 4, 2024	8 episodes	39–43 min	All markets	
Unmasked	Office humor action thriller	January 15, 2025	12 episodes	55–66 min	All markets	
Hyper Knife	Medical crime thriller	March 19, 2025	8 episodes	58–67 min	All markets	
Nine Puzzles	Mystery crime thriller	May 21, 2025	11 episodes	49–62 min	All markets	
Low Life	Historical drama	July 16, 2025	11 episodes	54–56 min	All markets	
Tempest	Political thriller	September 10, 2025	9 episodes	45–76 min	All markets	
The Murky Stream	Historical drama	September 26, 2025	5 episodes	47–60 min	All markets	(Note: Star (Disney+) was rebranded as Hulu on Disney+ before additional episodes could premiere.)

==== Mandarin ====
Title	Genre	Premiere	Seasons	Runtime	Exclusive region(s)	Notes
Women in Taipei	Slice of life melodrama	September 21, 2022	11 episodes	43–53 min	Selected territories	
Taiwan Crime Stories	Psychological crime thriller	January 4, 2023	1 season, 12 episodes	44–61 min	Selected territories	

==== Polish ====
Title	Genre	Premiere	Seasons	Runtime	Exclusive region(s)	Notes
The Breslau Murders	Historical crime drama	September 12, 2025	8 episodes	32–49 min	Selected territories	

==== Portuguese ====
Title	Genre	Premiere	Seasons	Runtime	Exclusive region(s)	Notes
Double Crossed: Sooner or Later, You'll Pay the Price	Action drama	August 21, 2024	4 episodes	28–39 min	Selected territories	
Guga by Kuerten	Sports docuseries	September 10, 2024	5 episodes	19–32 min	Brazil and Latin America	
Finding Priscila	True crime docuseries	September 25, 2024	4 episodes	TBA	Brazil	
Benefits with Friends	Romantic comedy	November 22, 2024	1 season, 10 episodes	39–40 min	Selected territories	
Meu Sangue Ferve por Você	Music biopic	December 18, 2024	4 episodes	40 min	Brazil	
Maria: The Outlaw Legend	Historical drama	April 4, 2025	1 season, 6 episodes	32–45 min	Selected territories	
Team Players	Comedy drama	July 9, 2025	1 season, 8 episodes	31–39 min	Selected territories	
Capoeiras	Historical crime drama	August 29, 2025	1 season, 6 episodes	34–43 min	Selected territories	

==== Spanish ====
Title	Genre	Premiere	Seasons	Runtime	Exclusive region(s)	Notes
Our Only Chance	Drama	December 2, 2022	5 episodes	47–58 min	All markets	
548 Days: Abducted Online	True crime docuseries	June 30, 2023	3 episodes	52–62 min	All markets	
Isabel Preysler: My Christmas	Reality	December 5, 2023	2 episodes	39 min	Selected territories	
Cristóbal Balenciaga	Biopic	January 19, 2024	6 episodes	44–57 min	Selected territories	
See You in Another Life	Crime thriller	March 6, 2024	6 episodes	32–44 min	Selected territories	
Past Lies	Drama thriller	May 10, 2024	6 episodes	49–51 min	Selected territories	
Lucrecia: A Murder in Madrid	True crime docuseries	June 27, 2024	4 episodes	32–36 min	Selected territories	
Checo Pérez: Never Give Up	Sports docuseries	July 31, 2024	4 episodes	28–32 min	Latin America	
The Absent Voice	Psychological thriller	August 21, 2024	1 season, 7 episodes	26–32 min	Latin America	
The King of the Machos	Comedy drama	August 21, 2024	1 season, 8 episodes	45 min	Latin America	
The Chavez	Reality	September 11, 2024	1 season, 6 episodes	28–38 min	Selected territories	
Mama Cake	Comedy	September 25, 2024	1 season, 10 episodes	27–33 min	Selected territories	
Return to Las Sabinas	Telenovela	October 11, 2024	70 episodes	38–55 min	Selected territories	
I, Addict	Drama	October 30, 2024	6 episodes	27–46 min	Selected territories	
Argentina '78: The Deadliest World Cup	Sports docuseries	November 27, 2024	4 episodes	TBA	Latin America	
The Best Heart Attack of My Life	Comedy drama	January 24, 2025	6 episodes	28–38 min	Selected territories	
Shared Custody	Comedy drama	January 24, 2025	8 episodes	28–36 min	Selected territories	
Between Walls	Romantic comedy	February 12, 2025	1 season, 10 episodes	30–32 min	Selected territories	
Spartans: A True Story	Sports drama	February 19, 2025	1 season, 8 episodes	30–44 min	Selected territories	
@New mamita, la madre de todas las mentiras	Romantic comedy	April 9, 2025	1 season, 8 episodes	30 min	Latin America	
Kun by Agüero	Sports docuseries	May 7, 2025	4 episodes	42–49 min	Selected territories	
Adolfo Cambiaso, en el nombre del polo	Sports docuseries	June 10, 2025	3 episodes	TBA	Latin America	
Suspicious Minds	Action comedy	June 13, 2025	6 episodes	44–47 min	Selected territories	
The Clan Olimpia: A Redemption Story	Crime thriller	July 9, 2025	6 episodes	47–63 min	Selected territories	
Breakdown	Crime drama	August 15, 2025	1 season, 6 episodes	41–48 min	Selected territories	
Los Mufas: Suerte para la desgracia	Dark comedy	September 12, 2025	1 season, 8 episodes	30 min	Latin America	

==== Turkish ====
Title	Genre	Premiere	Seasons	Runtime	Exclusive region(s)	Notes
Runaway	Action thriller	June 14, 2022 (Note: Turkey); January 4, 2023	1 season, 8 episodes	39–51 min	All markets	(Note: These shows were once available as Star Originals, but have been since removed from the service.)
Between the World and Us	Romantic drama	September 14, 2022; December 13, 2022	1 season, 8 episodes	49–57 min	All markets	
The Choice	Thriller	November 16, 2022	1 season, 8 episodes	30–41 min	All markets	
The Actress	Crime thriller	May 31, 2023	1 season, 8 episodes	42–43 min	All markets	
Search	Crime thriller	June 14, 2023	1 season, 6 episodes	48–62 min	All markets	
Reminder	Romantic comedy	June 18, 2025; September 3, 2025	8 episodes	39–54 min	Selected territories	

=== Co-productions ===
Title	Genre	Partner/country	Premiere	Seasons	Runtime	Language	Exclusive region(s)	Notes
Blowing Kisses	Romantic comedy	Telecinco/Spain	March 26, 2021 (Note: Selected territories); July 14, 2021 (Note: Portugal); August 11, 2021; October 6, 2021 (Note: France)	2 episodes	77–79 min	Spanish	Selected territories	
Extreme Forest	Travel docu-reality	National Geographic & LINE TV/Taiwan	May 14, 2022	1 season, 12 episodes	50 min	Mandarin	Selected territories	(Note: Moved to Discovery Channel Taiwan/Discovery Asia for season 2)
Small & Mighty	Legal comedy drama	Bilibili/China & Taiwan	June 15, 2022	26 episodes	30 min	Mandarin	All markets	
Lost Man Found	Comedy drama	NHK BS Premium/Japan	June 26, 2022	10 episodes	48 min	Japanese	All markets	
The Invisible Girl	Drama thriller	Beta Film/Germany	February 15, 2023	8 episodes	31–42 min	Spanish	Selected territories	
The Full Monty	Comedy drama	FX on Hulu/United States	June 14, 2023	8 episodes	38–54 min	English	All markets	
Pedro el escamoso: más escamoso que nunca	Telenovela	Caracol Televisión/Colombia	July 16, 2024	1 season, 23 episodes	44–51 min	Spanish	Latin America	
Bellas artes (season 2) (Note: Season 1 originally aired on Star+.)	Dark comedy	Movistar Plus+/Spain	October 23, 2024	1 season, 6 episodes	TBA	Spanish	Latin America	
Whiskey on the Rocks	Comedy drama satire	SVT1/Sweden	January 22, 2025	6 episodes	29–30 min	Swedish	All territories	
Ghosts: Fantômes en héritage	Sitcom	TF1/France	April 9, 2025	6 episodes	30 min	French	Selected territories	
Necaxa	Sports docuseries	FXX/United States	August 8, 2025	1 season, 10 episodes	42–47 min	English; Spanish	All markets	

=== Continuations ===
Title	Genre	Premiere	Prev. network(s)	Seasons	Runtime	Exclusive region(s)	Language	Notes
The John Dykes Show	Sports talk show	January 14, 2022	Fox Sports Asia	1 season, 27 episodes	48–66 min	English	Hong Kong and Singapore	
Boris (season 4)	Comedy	October 26, 2022	Fox International Channels Italy	1 season, 8 episodes	29–36 min	Italian	All markets	
The Boss (season 3)	Comedy drama	July 19, 2024	Star+	1 season, 7 episodes	26–35 min	Spanish	Selected territories	
Impure (season 5)	Crime drama	July 24, 2024	Fox Premium (seasons 1–2); Star+ (seasons 3–4)	1 season, 10 episodes	45–55 min	Portuguese	Selected territories	
Bref (season 2)	Comedy	February 14, 2025	Canal+	1 season, 6 episodes	31–40 min	French	Selected territories	

== Exclusive international distribution ==
Some series still receive exclusive international distribution in Japan.

=== Drama ===
Title	Genre	Original network	Premiere	Seasons	Runtime	Exclusive region(s)	Notes
9-1-1	Procedural drama	Fox (seasons 1–6); ABC (seasons 7–8)	February 23, 2021	8 seasons, 124 episodes	42–45 min	Selected territories	
Big Sky	Crime thriller	ABC	February 23, 2021	3 seasons, 47 episodes	42–44 min	All markets	
Feud	Biographical drama anthology	FX	February 23, 2021	2 seasons, 16 episodes	45–63 min	Selected territories	
Godfather of Harlem	Crime drama	EPIX (seasons 1–2); MGM+ (season 3)	February 23, 2021 (Note: Italy and Belgium); March 12, 2021	3 seasons, 30 episodes	48–60 min	Selected territories	
Good Trouble	Drama	Freeform	February 23, 2021 (Note: Canada); July 23, 2021; January 5, 2022	5 seasons, 88 episodes	42–50 min.	Selected territories	
Grand Hotel	Drama	ABC	September 9, 2019	1 season, 13 episodes	42–43 min	France & Spain	
Grey's Anatomy	Medical drama	ABC	February 23, 2021	21 seasons, 448 episodes	42–44 min	Selected territories	
Helstrom	Superhero / dark fantasy	Hulu	February 23, 2021	1 season, 10 episodes	44–55 min	All markets	
The Hot Zone	Drama anthology	National Geographic	February 23, 2021	2 seasons, 12 episodes	44–47 min	Selected territories	
Love, Victor	Romantic teen drama	Hulu; Disney+ (season 3 only)	February 23, 2021	3 seasons, 28 episodes	24–34 min	All markets	
Snowfall	Crime drama	FX	February 23, 2021	6 seasons, 60 episodes	60 min	Ireland and United Kingdom	
Station 19	Action drama	ABC	February 23, 2021	7 seasons, 105 episodes	46–70 min	Selected territories	
Black Narcissus	Drama	FX; BBC One	March 5, 2021	3 episodes	57–60 min	All markets except Australia, Canada, Ireland, New Zealand and United Kingdom	
Filthy Rich	Soap opera	Fox	March 12, 2021; April 2, 2021; April 23, 2021	1 season, 10 episodes	41–44 min	Selected territories	
Next	Science fiction crime drama	Fox	March 12, 2021; November 3, 2021	1 season, 10 episodes	43–45 min	Selected territories	
A Teacher	Drama	FX on Hulu	April 23, 2021	10 episodes	21–29 min	Selected territories	
Genius (seasons 3–4)	Biographical drama anthology series	National Geographic	April 30, 2021; June 4, 2021 (Note: France, Ireland, Portugal and United Kingdom)	2 seasons, 16 episodes	44–57 min	Selected territories	
Rebel	Legal comedy-drama	ABC	May 28, 2021	1 season, 10 episodes	41–44 min	All markets except Canada	
The Gloaming	Supernatural thriller / mystery crime drama	Stan	June 11, 2021	1 season, 8 episodes	50–55 min	Selected territories	
The Walking Dead (season 11)	Zombie apocalypse horror	AMC	August 23, 2021	1 season, 24 episodes	42–67 min	Ireland, Italy and United Kingdom	
American Horror Stories	Horror anthology	FX on Hulu	August 25, 2021 (Note: Singapore); September 8, 2021 (Note: France, Ireland, Italy and United Kingdom)	3 seasons, 24 episodes	38–49 min	All markets except Australia, Canada, and New Zealand	
Y: The Last Man	Post-apocalyptic Science fiction	FX on Hulu	September 22, 2021	1 season, 10 episodes	47–54 min	All markets except Australia and Canada	
American Horror Story (seasons 10–12)	Horror anthology	FX	October 20, 2021	3 seasons, 29 episodes	35–58 min	Selected territories	
The Big Leap	Musical comedy drama	Fox	October 27, 2021; November 3, 2021; December 1, 2021	1 season, 11 episodes	40–45 min	Selected territories	
The Premise	Anthology series	FX on Hulu	November 3, 2021	1 season, 5 episodes	29–32 min	Selected territories	
Dopesick	Drama	Hulu	November 12, 2021	8 episodes	57–63 min	All markets	
Queens	Musical drama	ABC	November 24, 2021; January 19, 2022	1 season, 13 episodes	41–44 min	Selected territories	
Our Kind of People	Drama	Fox	December 15, 2021; February 16, 2022	1 season, 12 episodes	44 min	Selected territories	
The Chi	Drama	Showtime	January 12, 2022	7 seasons, 78 episodes	46–58 min	Selected territories	
Pam & Tommy	Biographical drama	Hulu	February 2, 2022	8 episodes	43–51 min	Selected territories	
Promised Land	Drama	ABC	March 2, 2022; May 4, 2022	1 season, 10 episodes	42–57 min	Selected territories	
Wu-Tang: An American Saga	Drama	Hulu	March 2, 2022; May 25, 2022	3 seasons, 30 episodes	41–58 min	Selected territories	
The Dropout	Drama	Hulu	March 3, 2022; April 20, 2022	8 episodes	45–55 min	All markets	
The Hardy Boys	Mystery teen drama	Hulu; YTV	April 6, 2022; December 14, 2022	2 seasons, 23 episodes	40–46 min	All markets except Canada	
Pistol	Biographical drama	FX on Hulu	May 31, 2022; July 6, 2022 (Note: Hong Kong and Taiwan); July 17, 2022 (Note: Japan); August 19, 2022 (Note: South Korea)	6 episodes	46–57 min	All markets except Canada	
The Orville (season 3)	Science fiction comedy drama	Fox (seasons 1–2); Hulu (season 3)	June 2, 2022; August 10, 2022	3 seasons, 36 episodes	43–87 min	Selected territories	
Under the Banner of Heaven	Crime drama	FX on Hulu	June 8, 2022; August 3, 2022	7 episodes	63–88 min	All markets except Canada	
9-1-1: Lone Star	Procedural drama	Fox	July 6, 2022	5 seasons, 72 episodes	42–48 min	Selected territories	
The Old Man	Action thriller	FX	July 13, 2022; August 19, 2022; September 28, 2022	2 seasons, 15 episodes	39–64 min	All markets except Canada	
Candy	True crime drama	Hulu	July 27, 2022 (Note: Canada, Australia and New Zealand); August 10, 2022; October 12, 2022	5 episodes	48−55 min	All markets	
Mike	Biographical drama	Hulu	August 25, 2022	8 episodes	21–33 min	All markets	
The Patient	Psychological thriller	FX on Hulu	August 30, 2022; November 30, 2022	10 episodes	21–46 min	Selected territories	
Tell Me Lies	Romantic drama	Hulu	September 7, 2022; November 16, 2022	2 seasons, 18 episodes	45–53 min	All markets	
Reasonable Doubt	Legal drama	Hulu	September 27, 2022	3 seasons, 29 episodes	46–55 min	All markets	
Fleishman Is in Trouble	Drama	FX on Hulu	November 17, 2022	8 episodes	47–52 min	All markets except Canada	
Welcome to Chippendales	Biographical drama	Hulu	November 22, 2022	8 episodes	35–46 min	All markets	
Criminal Minds (seasons 16–18)	Crime drama	Paramount+	November 24, 2022	3 seasons, 30 episodes	44–56 min	Selected territories	
Alaska Daily	Drama	ABC	January 4, 2023; February 8, 2023	1 season, 10 episodes	42–44 min	Selected territories	
Kindred	Science fiction drama	FX on Hulu	February 8, 2023	1 season, 8 episodes	36–54 min	All markets except Canada	
True Lies	Action drama	CBS	March 1, 2023; April 19, 2023	1 season, 10 episodes	42–44 min	Selected territories	
Will Trent	Crime drama	ABC	March 8, 2023; April 5, 2023	3 seasons, 41 episodes	42–44 min	Selected territories	
The Watchful Eye	Mystery thriller	Freeform	March 29, 2023	1 season, 10 episodes	42–44 min	Selected territories	
The Company You Keep	Drama	ABC	April 5, 2023	1 season, 9 episodes	42–43 min	Selected territories	
Tiny Beautiful Things	Drama	Hulu	April 7, 2023	8 episodes	26–32 min	All markets	
A Small Light	Biographical drama	National Geographic	May 2, 2023	8 episodes	40–53 min	All markets	
Class of '09	Crime drama	FX on Hulu	May 10, 2023; January 3, 2024	1 season, 8 episodes	38–48 min	All markets except Canada	
Saint X	Psychological drama	Hulu	June 7, 2023	8 episodes	42–53 min	All markets	
Great Expectations	Historical drama	BBC One; FX on Hulu	June 28, 2023	6 episodes	56–58 min	All markets except Canada and United Kingdom	
Justified: City Primeval	Neo-Western crime drama	FX	July 19, 2023; September 6, 2023	8 episodes	43–52 min.	Selected territories	
Black Cake	Historical drama	Hulu	November 1, 2023; January 31, 2024	1 season, 8 episodes	45–55 min.	Selected territories	
A Murder at the End of the World	Murder mystery	FX on Hulu	November 14, 2023	7 episodes	42–72 min	All markets except Canada	
Death and Other Details	Murder mystery	Hulu	January 16, 2024	1 season, 10 episodes	40–52 min	All markets	
Shōgun	Historical drama	FX on Hulu	February 27, 2024	1 season, 10 episodes	53–70 min	All markets except Canada	
Tracker	Action drama	CBS	April 3, 2024; June 19, 2024; July 3, 2024	2 seasons, 26 episodes	42–44 min	Selected territories	
We Were the Lucky Ones	Historical drama	Hulu	April 17, 2024; June 19, 2024; August 7, 2024	8 episodes	50–56 min	Selected territories	
The Veil	Spy thriller	FX on Hulu	April 30, 2024; May 29, 2024	6 episodes	38–46 min	All markets except Canada	
Under the Bridge	True crime drama	Hulu	May 8, 2024; June 12, 2024; July 10, 2024	8 episodes	46–47 min	Selected territories	
Clipped	Sports drama	FX on Hulu	June 4, 2024	6 episodes	44–49 min	All markets except Canada	
Queenie	Drama	Channel 4; Hulu	June 7, 2024	8 episodes	25–26 min	All markets except Ireland and United Kingdom	
Resident Alien (season 3) (Note: Previous seasons were released exclusively on Star+)	Comedy drama	Syfy	September 11, 2024	1 seasons, 10 episodes	40–80 min	Brazil and Latin America	
American Sports Story	Sports drama anthology	FX	September 18, 2024 (Note: Rest of the world); November 20, 2024	1 season, 10 episodes	38–59 min	All markets except Canada	
Grotesquerie	Horror drama	FX	September 26, 2024; October 23, 2024	10 episodes	30–57 min	All markets except Canada	
Doctor Odyssey	Medical drama	ABC	September 27, 2024; October 24, 2024; January 15, 2025	1 season, 18 episodes	42 min	Selected territories	
Bel-Air (season 3)	Coming-of-age drama	Peacock	October 2, 2024	1 season, 10 episodes	40–80 min	Brazil and Latin America	
Law & Order: Organized Crime	Crime drama	NBC (seasons 1–4); Peacock (season 5)	October 2, 2024	5 seasons, 75 episodes	40–49 min	Brazil and Latin America	
Say Nothing	Historical political drama	FX on Hulu	November 14, 2024; December 11, 2024	10 episodes	40–49 min	All markets except Canada	
The Day of the Jackal	Political thriller	Peacock; Sky Atlantic	November 15, 2024	1 season, 10 episodes	49–56 min	Brazil and Latin America	
Interior Chinatown	Crime drama	Hulu	November 19, 2024	10 episodes	35–47 min	All markets	
Outlander	Historical fantasy	Starz	November 23, 2024	7 seasons, 91 episodes	53–90 min	Brazil and Latin America	
High Potential	Crime procedural	ABC	January 23, 2025; March 19, 2025	2 seasons, 15 episodes	42–44 min	Selected territories	
Paradise	Crime drama	Hulu	January 26, 2025	1 season, 8 episodes	46–57 min	All markets	
Good American Family	True crime drama	Hulu	March 19, 2025; May 7, 2025	8 episodes	46–52 min	All markets	
Dying for Sex	Comedy drama	FX on Hulu	April 4, 2025	8 episodes	27–35 min	All markets except Canada	
Doc	Medical drama	Fox	May 14, 2025	1 season, 10 episodes	44 min	Brazil and Latin America	
Washington Black	Historical drama	Hulu	July 23, 2025	8 episodes	32–57 min	All markets	
Outlander: Blood of My Blood	Historical romance drama	Starz	August 9, 2025	1 season, 10 episodes	59–80 min	Brazil and Latin America	
Alien: Earth	Science fiction horror	FX on Hulu	August 12, 2025	1 season, 8 episodes	54–63 min	All markets	
The Twisted Tale of Amanda Knox	True crime drama	Hulu	August 20, 2025	8 episodes	48–55 min	All markets	
The Lowdown	Drama	FX	September 24, 2025; November 26, 2025; December 10, 2025	1 season, 8 episodes	49–59 min	All markets	

=== Comedy ===
Title	Genre	Original network	Premiere	Seasons	Runtime	Exclusive region(s)	Notes
High Fidelity	Romantic comedy	Hulu	February 23, 2021 (Note: Portugal, Spain, Denmark, Finland, Sweden, Belgium, and Eastern Europe); January 26, 2022	1 season, 10 episodes	26–34 min	Selected territories	
Atlanta	Surreal comedy drama	FX	February 23, 2021	4 seasons, 41 episodes	23–35 min	Selected territories	
Dollface	Comedy	Hulu	March 5, 2021 (Note: Ireland, Italy, Norway, Sweden and United Kingdom); April 9, 2021 (Note: Belgium); April 16, 2021	2 seasons, 20 episodes	22–32 min	Selected territories	
Love in the Time of Corona	Romantic comedy	Freeform	March 12, 2021; March 26, 2021; April 2, 2021	4 episodes	27–35 min	Selected territories	
Grown-ish	Teen comedy drama	Freeform	April 23, 2021; April 30, 2021; July 30, 2021	6 seasons, 105 episodes	20–23 min	Selected territories	
American Housewife	Sitcom	ABC	May 14, 2021	5 seasons, 103 episodes	20–21 min	Selected territories	
Last Man Standing	Sitcom	ABC (seasons 1–6); Fox (seasons 7–9)	July 28, 2021	9 seasons, 194 episodes	21 min	Selected territories	
Mixed-ish	Period sitcom	ABC	August 18, 2021	2 seasons, 36 episodes	19–21 min	Selected territories	
Only Murders in the Building	Crime comedy	Hulu	August 31, 2021	5 seasons, 50 episodes	26–40 min	All markets	
Reservation Dogs	Teen comedy drama	FX on Hulu	September 1, 2021; September 15, 2021 (Note: New Zealand); October 13, 2021 (Note: Germany, Austria and Switzerland); August 6, 2025 (Note: Australia)	2 seasons, 18 episodes	24–32 min	All markets except Canada	
Dave	Comedy	FXX	September 22, 2021 (Note: Germany, Austria, Switzerland, and Eastern Europe); April 5, 2023	3 seasons, 30 episodes	24–32 min	All markets except Canada	
What We Do in the Shadows	Horror mockumentary	FX	October 1, 2021	6 seasons, 61 episodes	22–30 min	Selected territories	
The Wonder Years	Coming-of-age comedy	ABC	December 22, 2021	2 seasons, 32 episodes	21–22 min	Selected territories	
Single Drunk Female	Comedy	Freeform	January 26, 2022; April 6, 2022	2 season, 20 episodes	20–25 min.	Selected territories	
Abbott Elementary	Mockumentary sitcom	ABC	February 16, 2022	4 seasons, 71 episodes	21–22 min	Selected territories	
How I Met Your Father	Sitcom	Hulu	March 9, 2022; May 11, 2022; May 25, 2022; June 8, 2022 (Note: Germany)	2 seasons, 30 episodes	22–25 min	All markets	
Life & Beth	Comedy drama	Hulu	March 18, 2022; May 18, 2022	2 seasons, 20 episodes	24–32 min	All markets	
Fresh Off the Boat	Sitcom	ABC	May 4, 2022; December 6, 2023	6 seasons, 116 episodes	19–21 min	Selected territories	
The Bear	Comedy drama	FX on Hulu	August 3, 2022; August 31, 2022; October 5, 2022	4 seasons, 38 episodes	20–66 min	All markets except Canada	
Maggie	Sitcom	Hulu	August 10, 2022	1 season, 13 episodes	23–24 min	All markets	
This Fool	Comedy	Hulu	August 12, 2022	2 seasons, 20 episodes	22–31 min	Canada	
Reboot	Comedy	Hulu	September 20, 2022; November 2, 2022	1 season, 8 episodes	22–33 min	Selected territories	
It's Always Sunny in Philadelphia	Sitcom	FX (seasons 1–8); FXX (seasons 9–16)	January 26, 2023	17 seasons, 178 episodes	18–43 min	Selected territories	
Not Dead Yet	Comedy	ABC	February 9, 2023	2 seasons, 23 episodes	20–22 min	Australia and New Zealand	
History of the World, Part II	Sketch comedy	Hulu	March 6, 2023	8 episodes	21–30 min	Selected territories	
Unprisoned	Comedy drama	Hulu	March 10, 2023	2 seasons, 16 episodes	25–31 min	All markets	
Up Here	Musical romantic comedy	Hulu	March 24, 2023	1 season, 8 episodes	24–31 min	All markets	
The Other Black Girl	Dark comedy psychological thriller	Hulu	September 13, 2023	1 season, 10 episodes	25–32 min	All markets	
English Teacher	Comedy drama	FX	September 3, 2024; November 27, 2024	2 seasons, 18 episodes	21–24 min	All markets except Canada	
How to Die Alone	Comedy	Hulu	September 13, 2024	1 season, 8 episodes	27–35 min	All markets	
Deli Boys	Comedy	Hulu	March 6, 2025	1 season, 10 episodes	21–27 min	All markets	
Mid-Century Modern	Sitcom	Hulu	March 28, 2025	1 season, 10 episodes	21–25 min	Selected territories	
Shifting Gears	Sitcom	ABC	April 23, 2025; May 7, 2025; May 14, 2025	1 season, 10 episodes	22 min	Selected territories	
Adults	Comedy	FX	May 28, 2025	1 season, 8 episodes	20–27 min	Selected territories	
Chad Powers	Sports comedy	Hulu	September 30, 2025	1 season, 6 episodes	34–42 min	All markets	

=== Animation ===
==== Adult animation ====
Title	Genre	Original network	Premiere	Seasons	Runtime	Exclusive region(s)	Notes
American Dad!	Sitcom	Fox (seasons 1–11); TBS (seasons 12–20)	February 23, 2021	21 seasons, 388 episodes	21 min	Selected territories	
Bob's Burgers	Sitcom	Fox	February 23, 2021	15 seasons, 298 episodes	21 min	Selected territories	
Cake	Psychedelic anthology series	FXX	February 23, 2021; March 9, 2022	5 seasons, 55 episodes	22 min	Selected territories	
Family Guy	Sitcom	Fox	February 23, 2021	23 seasons, 444 episodes	21 min	Selected territories	
The Simpsons	Sitcom	Fox	August 31, 2021	36 seasons, 790 episodes	21 min	Selected territories	
Solar Opposites	Science fiction sitcom	Hulu	February 23, 2021	5 seasons, 53 episodes	21–25 min	All markets	
Bless the Harts	Sitcom	Fox	April 2, 2021; June 7, 2021 (Note: Australia); August 11, 2021; November 3, 2021	2 seasons, 34 episodes	22 min	Selected territories	
M.O.D.O.K.	Superhero science fiction comedy	Hulu	May 21, 2021	1 season, 10 episodes	22 min	All markets	
The Great North	Sitcom	Fox	September 29, 2021; June 16, 2022 (Note: Israel)	5 seasons, 82 episodes	22–27 min	Selected territories	
Hit-Monkey	Superhero science fiction comedy	Hulu	January 26, 2022	2 seasons, 20 episodes	22–27 min	All markets	
Little Demon	Sitcom	FXX	September 21, 2022	1 season, 10 episodes	22–26 min	All markets	
Koala Man	Superhero comedy	Hulu	January 9, 2023	1 season, 8 episodes	23–24 min	All markets	
Praise Petey	Comedy	Freeform	September 6, 2023	1 season, 10 episodes	20–21 min	Selected territories	

==== Anime ====
Title	Genre	Original network	Premiere	Seasons	Runtime	Language	Exclusive region(s)	Notes
Platinum End (Note: These shows premiered on the service without the Star Original billing, as these shows premiered exclusively on Star under license from third-party licensers.)	Supernatural thriller	TBS, BS11, RKK, KBC, TUF, CBC TV, HBC, tbc, IBC	February 25, 2022	24 episodes	24 min	Japanese	Hong Kong, Singapore and Taiwan	
Black Rock Shooter: Dawn Fall	Action science fantasy	Tokyo MX, BS11, KBS Kyoto, SUN, TV Aichi	April 3, 2022; May 25, 2022 (Note: Asia-Pacific territories); August 14, 2022	12 episodes	24 min	Japanese	All markets except Japan	
Dance Dance Danseur	Coming-of-age drama	JNN (TBS, MBS), BS Asahi, AT-X	April 8, 2022; May 25, 2022 (Note: Hong Kong, Taiwan and Singapore); August 28, 2022	1 season, 11 episodes	24 min	Japanese	All Asia markets except Japan (Note: The series was exclusive to Disney+ in Japan until April 9, 2023)	
Summer Time Rendering	Supernatural suspense mystery	Tokyo MX, BS11, Kansai TV, KBC	April 15, 2022; June 1, 2022; July 20, 2022; January 9, 2023	25 episodes	24 min	Japanese	All markets except Japan (Note: The series was exclusive to Disney+ in Japan until November 15, 2022)	
Aoashi	Coming-of-age sports drama	NHK E	June 8, 2022; July 27, 2022	1 season, 24 episodes	24 min	Japanese	All Asia markets except Japan	
Tomodachi Game	Psychological thriller	Nippon TV, BS Nittere, KKT, AT-X	June 8, 2022	1 season, 12 episodes	24 min	Japanese	All Asia markets except Japan	
The Devil Is a Part-Timer!!	Fantasy comedy	Tokyo MX, BS11, MBS, AT-X	July 14, 2022	1 season, 24 episodes	24 min	Japanese	Japan	
Bleach: Thousand-Year Blood War	Supernatural adventure	TV Tokyo	October 10, 2022	3 parts, 27 episodes	24 min	Japanese	Selected territories	
Tokyo Revengers (season 2) (Note: Both the Christmas Showdown and Tenjiku arcs are listed together as season 2 on the Star content hub.)	Fantasy action drama	MBS, TV Tokyo, TV Aichi, TVh, TVQ, BS Asahi, AT-X, TSK, QAB, RKK, Aomori TV, UTY, RSK	January 8, 2023	1 seasons, 26 episodes	24 min	Japanese	All markets	
Tengoku-Daimakyo (Heavenly Delusion)	Science fiction mystery adventure	Tokyo MX, BS11, HTB, RKB, TV Aichi, MBS	April 1, 2023	1 season, 13 episodes	24 min	Japanese	All markets	
Synduality: Noir	Science fiction action-adventure	TXN (TV Tokyo), BS Nittele, AT-X	July 10, 2023	1 season, 14 episodes	24 min	Japanese	All markets	
Undead Unluck	Supernatural action-adventure comedy	JNN (MBS, TBS)	December 13, 2023	1 season, 24 episodes	24 min	Japanese	Selected territories	
Ishura	Fantasy action-adventure	Tokyo MX, BS Nittele, KBS Kyoto, SUN, Mētele, AT-X	January 3, 2024	2 seasons, 24 episodes	23 min	Japanese	All markets	
Go! Go! Loser Ranger!	Tokusatsu black comedy	JNN (TBS, CBC), BS11, AT-X	April 7, 2024	2 seasons, 24 episodes	23 min	Japanese	All markets	
Mission: Yozakura Family	Spy thriller	JNN (TBS, MBS)	April 7, 2024	1 season, 27 episodes	23 min	Japanese	Selected territories	
The Fable	Crime thriller	NNS (Nippon TV), BS Nittere	April 7, 2024	1 season, 25 episodes	23 min	Japanese	All markets	
Code Geass: Rozé of the Recapture	Mecha military/Science fantasy	Theatrical release	June 21, 2024	12 episodes	24 min	Japanese	All markets	
Murai in Love	Romantic comedy	Tokyo MX, BS Nittere, BBC Biwako	September 4, 2024 (Note: The series premiered prior to the linear TV broadcast on October 6, 2024)	1 season, 12 episodes	23 min	Japanese	All markets	
Medalist	Sports drama	ANN (TV Asahi), CS Asahi 1, BS Asahi	January 5, 2025	1 season, 13 episodes	23 min	Japanese	All markets	

==== Kids & family ====
Title	Original network	Premiere	Seasons	Runtime	Language	Exclusive region(s)	Notes
The Beachbuds	Disney+ Hotstar	November 12, 2021	52 episodes	11 min	English	Singapore	
Ejen Ali (season 3)	TV3; Disney+ Hotstar (season 3)	June 25, 2022; November 17, 2022 (Note: Philippines)	3 seasons, 39 episodes	TBA	Malay	Singapore and Philippines	

=== Unscripted ===
==== Docuseries ====
Title	Subject	Original network	Premiere	Seasons	Runtime	Exclusive region(s)	Notes
Pride	LGBT rights	FX	June 25, 2021	6 episodes	41–46 min	Selected territories	
McCartney 3,2,1	Music	Hulu	July 16, 2021; August 25, 2021	6 episodes	27–31 min	Selected territories	
Hip Hop Uncovered	Hip hop	FX	July 16, 2021 (Note: Italy); July 21, 2021; July 23, 2021; August 6, 2021	6 episodes	53–60 min	Selected territories	
A Wilderness of Error	True crime	FX	June 25, 2021; August 6, 2021; August 18, 2021	5 episodes	40–61 min	Selected territories	
Superstar	American culture	ABC	April 18, 2022	7 episodes	40–41 min	United Kingdom and Ireland	
Have You Seen This Man?	True crime	Hulu	June 22, 2022	3 episodes	37–41 min	Selected territories	
Captive Audience: A Real American Horror Story	Paranormal	Hulu	July 6, 2022	3 episodes	42–49 min	Selected territories	
City of Angels | City of Death	True crime	Hulu	July 20, 2022	6 episodes	40–46 min	Selected territories	
Wild Crime	True crime	Hulu	July 20, 2022	4 seasons, 16 episodes	39–41 min	Selected territories	
Welcome to Wrexham	Sports	FX	August 25, 2022 (Note: Australia, Ireland, New Zealand, Singapore and United Kingdom)	4 seasons, 49 episodes	20–47 min	Selected territories	
Mormon No More	LGBT rights	Hulu	October 12, 2022	4 episodes	49–51 min	Selected territories	
Let the World See	American history	ABC	October 12, 2022	3 episodes	20–41 min	Selected territories	
The Captain	Sports	ESPN; ESPN+	October 12, 2022	7 episodes	49–51 min	Selected territories	
Keep This Between Us	True crime	Freeform	November 16, 2022	4 episodes	43–44 min	Selected territories	
Legacy: The True Story of the LA Lakers	Sports	Hulu	November 23, 2022	10 episodes	47–66 min	Selected territories	
The Murders Before the Marathon	True crime	Hulu	November 23, 2022	3 episodes	42–47 min	Selected territories	
Children of the Underground	True crime	FX	December 7, 2022	5 episodes	45–54 min	Selected territories	
The Come Up	Docu-soap	Freeform	December 7, 2022	8 episodes	21 min	Selected territories	
The Deep End	Biography	Freeform	December 28, 2022	4 episodes	43–45 min	Selected territories	
Death in the Dorms	True crime	Hulu	January 5, 2023	2 seasons, 12 episodes	55–56 min	Selected territories	
How I Caught My Killer	True crime	Hulu	January 12, 2023	2 seasons, 19 episodes	42–50 min	Selected territories	
Killing County	True crime	Hulu	February 8, 2023	3 episodes	46–47 min	Selected territories	
Stolen Youth: Inside the Cult at Sarah Lawrence	True crime	Hulu	February 9, 2023	3 episodes	63–74 min	Selected territories	
The Hair Tales	Culture	OWN; Hulu	February 15, 2023	1 season, 6 episodes	41 min.	Selected territories	
Web of Death	True crime	Hulu	February 22, 2023	6 episodes	45–60 min.	Selected territories	
Where Is Private Dulaney?	True crime	Hulu	March 15, 2023	3 episodes	46–52 min	Selected territories	
Still Missing Morgan	True crime	Hulu	March 22, 2023	4 episodes	50–59 min	Selected territories	
Pretty Baby: Brooke Shields	Biographical	Hulu	April 3, 2023	2 episodes	68–70 min	Selected territories	
RapCaviar Presents	Music	Hulu	April 12, 2023	6 episodes	41–43 min	Selected territories	
Searching for Soul Food	Travel/food	Hulu	June 2, 2023	8 episodes	22–27 min	Selected territories	
The 1619 Project	American history	Hulu	June 21, 2023	6 episodes	55–61 min	Selected territories	
The Ashley Madison Affair	True crime	Hulu	July 7, 2023	3 episodes	42–43 min	Selected territories	
The Secrets of Hillsong	Investigative journalism	FX	July 12, 2023	4 episodes	62–64 min	Selected territories	
The Lesson Is Murder	True crime	Hulu	July 19, 2023	3 episodes	53–54 min	Selected territories	
Demons & Saviors	True crime	Hulu	September 6, 2023; October 11, 2023; January 10, 2024	3 episodes	41–47 min	Selected territories	
Betrayal	True crime	Hulu	September 13, 2023	2 seasons, 6 episodes	41–45 min	Selected territories	
The Age of Influence	Social media / true crime	Hulu	September 27, 2023	6 episodes	49–65 min	Selected territories	
Dear Mama	Biography	FX on Hulu	October 4, 2023	5 episodes	49–65 min	Selected territories	
Never Let Him Go	True crime	Hulu	October 4, 2023; January 24, 2024	4 episodes	51–60 min	Selected territories	
Impact x Nightline	News magazine	Hulu	October 6, 2023	3 seasons, 100 episodes (Note: Several "episodes" are listed as separate entries on Hulu, rather than as part of the series.)	24–49 min	Selected territories	
The Conversations Project	African-American culture	Hulu	October 11, 2023	1 season, 6 episodes	30–33 min	Selected territories	
Algiers, America	Sports	Hulu	October 11, 2023	5 episodes	53–59 min	Selected territories	
BePlaying: The Voice Behind The Sound	Music	Star+	October 20, 2023	6 episodes	TBA	Netherlands, United Kingdom and Ireland	
Drive with Swizz Beatz	Cars	Hulu	November 15, 2023	6 episodes	32–36 min	Selected territories	
The Secret Life of Dancing Dogs	Dog show	Hulu	November 17, 2023; January 10, 2024	6 episodes	27–42 min	Selected territories	
Daughters of the Cult	True crime	Hulu	January 4, 2024; January 10, 2024	5 episodes	42–49 min	Selected territories	
Superhot: The Spicy World of Pepper People	Food	Hulu	January 22, 2024	10 episodes	31–38 min	All markets	
Thank You, Goodnight: The Bon Jovi Story	Music	Hulu	April 26, 2024	4 episodes	60–94 min	All markets	
Cult Massacre: One Day in Jonestown	True crime	Hulu; National Geographic	June 17, 2024	3 episodes	44 min	All markets	
Mastermind: To Think Like a Killer	True crime	Hulu	July 11, 2024	3 episodes	40–44 min	All markets	
After Baywatch: Moment in the Sun	Television	Hulu	September 18, 2024	4 episodes	46–50 min	Selected territories	
Perfect Wife: The Mysterious Disappearance of Sherri Papini	True crime	Hulu	September 22, 2024	3 episodes	52–61 min	Selected territories	
Out There: Crimes of the Paranormal	Paranormal/True crime	Hulu	September 24, 2024	1 season, 8 episodes	39–51 min	Selected territories	
At Witt's End: The Hunt for a Killer	True crime	Hulu	September 25, 2024	4 episodes	42–50 min	Selected territories	
Sasha Reid and the Midnight Order	True crime	Freeform	September 25, 2024	1 season, 5 episodes	41 min	Selected territories	
Little Miss Innocent: Passion. Poison. Prison.	True crime	Hulu	September 28, 2024	3 episodes	42 min	Selected territories	
Social Studies	Social media	FX	September 28, 2024	5 episodes	56–66 min	All markets	
Vow of Silence: The Assassination of Annie Mae	True crime	Hulu	January 1, 2025	4 episodes	51–53 min	Selected territories	
Devil in the Family: The Fall of Ruby Franke	True crime	Hulu	February 27, 2025; March 19, 2025	3 episodes	50 min	All markets	
Scamanda	True crime	ABC	February 23, 2025; March 23, 2025	4 episodes	41–42 min	Selected territories	
The Fox Hollow Murders: Playground of a Serial Killer	True crime	Hulu	April 2, 2025	4 episodes	48–55 min	Latin America	
How I Escaped My Cult	Cults/True crime	Freeform	April 16, 2025; April 23, 2025	1 season, 10 episodes	42 min	Selected territories	
Scam Goddess	True crime	Freeform	May 14, 2025; October 15, 2025	1 season, 6 episodes	42 min	Selected territories	
Diddy on Trial: As It Happened	True crime	Hulu	May 25, 2025	1 season, 6 episodes	28–39 min	Selected territories	
Call Her Alex	Media	Hulu	June 10, 2025	2 episodes	57–59 min	All markets	
Hey Beautiful: Anatomy of a Romance Scam	True crime	Hulu	July 16, 2025	3 episodes	50 min	Selected territories	
Stalking Samantha: 13 Years of Terror	True crime	Hulu	August 19, 2025	3 episodes	42 min	Selected territories	
Capturing Their Killer: The Girls on the High Bridge	True crime	Hulu	August 20, 2025	3 episodes	42 min	Selected territories	
Her Last Broadcast: The Abduction of Jodi Huisentruit	True crime	Hulu	August 20, 2025	3 episodes	42 min	Selected territories	
Murder Has Two Faces	True crime	Hulu	August 20, 2025	3 episodes	42 min	Selected territories	
Mr. & Mrs. Murder	True crime	Hulu	August 20, 2025	4 episodes	41–43 min	Selected territories	
Memphis to the Mountain	Rock climbing	Hulu	September 5, 2025	3 episodes	47–59 min	Selected territories	
Death in Apartment 603: What Happened to Ellen Greenberg?	True crime	Hulu	September 29, 2025	3 episodes	43 min	Selected territories	

==== Reality ====
Title	Genre	Original network	Premiere	Seasons	Runtime	Exclusive region(s)	Notes
The D'Amelio Show	Docu-reality	Hulu	September 3, 2021; September 15, 2021; October 13, 2021	3 seasons, 28 episodes	23–47 min	All markets except Hong Kong, Japan, South Korea and Taiwan	
The Kardashians	Docu-soap	Hulu	April 14, 2022; July 13, 2022	6 seasons, 60 episodes	39–56 min	All markets	
Best in Dough	Cooking competition	Hulu	September 19, 2022	1 season, 10 episodes	33–34 min	All markets	
Chefs vs. Wild	Cooking competition	Hulu	February 1, 2023	1 season, 8 episodes	39–41 min	All markets	
Back in the Groove	Dating competition	Hulu	February 8, 2023	1 season, 8 episodes	45–57 min	All markets	
Secrets & Sisterhood: The Sozahdahs	Docu-reality	Hulu	June 7, 2023	1 season, 10 episodes	36–44 min	All markets	
Love Trip: Paris	Dating show	Freeform	June 14, 2023	1 season, 8 episodes	41–42 min	Selected territories	
Secret Chef	Cooking competition	Hulu	June 29, 2023	1 season, 10 episodes	40–46 min	All markets	
Drag Me to Dinner	Cooking competition	Hulu	July 26, 2023	1 season, 10 episodes	35–43 min	Selected territories	
Living for the Dead	Paranormal activity	Hulu	October 25, 2023	1 season, 8 episodes	45–49 min	All markets	
Love in Fairhope	Dating docu-reality	Hulu	October 25, 2023; November 8, 2023; November 22, 2023	1 season, 9 episodes	20–30 min	Selected territories	
The Prank Panel	Reality panel show	ABC	November 1, 2023	1 season, 10 episodes	43 min	Selected territories	
Love & WWE: Bianca & Montez	Sports docu-reality	Hulu	February 2, 2024	1 season, 8 episodes	26–29 min	All markets	
Chrissy & Dave Dine Out	Reality	Freeform	March 6, 2024	1 season, 5 episodes	42 min	Selected territories	
Vanderpump Villa	Docu-soap	Hulu	April 1, 2024	2 seasons, 22 episodes	42–50 min	Selected territories	
High Hopes	Docu-reality	Hulu	April 20, 2024	1 season, 6 episodes	29–38 min	Selected territories	
Wayne Brady: The Family Remix	Docu-reality	Freeform	August 1, 2024; November 13, 2024	1 season, 6 episodes	42 min	Selected territories	
Grand Cayman: Secrets in Paradise	Docu-reality	Freeform	August 15, 2024	1 season, 10 episodes	28–43 min	Selected territories	
The Secret Lives of Mormon Wives	Docu-reality	Hulu	September 6, 2024	2 seasons, 19 episodes	40–49 min	All markets	
Royal Rules of Ohio	Reality	Freeform	September 25, 2024	1 season, 10 episodes	20 min	Selected territories	
Dress My Tour	Reality competition	Hulu	November 13, 2024	1 season, 10 episodes	42–49 min	Brazil and Latin America	
Muslim Matchmaker	Reality	Hulu	February 11, 2025	1 season, 8 episodes	30–37 min	Selected territories	
Got to Get Out	Reality competition	Hulu	April 11, 2025	1 season, 8 episodes	43–44 min	All markets	
Are You My First?	Dating show	Hulu	August 18, 2025	1 season, 10 episodes	41–65 min	All markets	
Love Thy Nader	Reality	Freeform	October 1, 2025	1 season, 8 episodes	41–42 min	Selected territories	

==== Variety ====
Title	Genre	Original network	Premiere	Seasons	Runtime	Exclusive region(s)	Notes
The Choe Show	Talk show	FX	December 8, 2021; December 29, 2021	1 season, 4 episodes	22–30 min	Selected territories	

=== Continuations ===
Title	Genre	Original network	Premiere	Seasons	Runtime	Exclusive region(s)	Notes
Futurama (seasons 8–10)	Science fiction animated sitcom	Fox (seasons 1–4); Comedy Central (seasons 5–7); Hulu (seasons 8–9)	July 24, 2023	3 seasons, 30 episodes	25–26 min	All markets	
King of the Hill (season 14)	Animated sitcom	Fox (seasons 1–13); Hulu (season 14)	August 4, 2025	1 season, 10 episodes	26–27 min	All markets	
Project Runway (season 21)	Reality competition	Bravo (seasons 1–5, 17–20); Lifetime (seasons 6–16); Freeform (season 21)	September 16, 2025	1 season, 10 episodes	42–45 min	Selected territories	

=== Non-English language ===
==== Indonesian ====
Title	Genre	Original network	Premiere	Seasons	Runtime	Exclusive region(s)	Notes
Between Two Hearts	Romantic thriller	Disney+ Hotstar	December 17, 2022	1 season, 8 episodes	48–51 min	Singapore and Philippines	
Blood Curse	Horror drama	Disney+ Hotstar	February 25, 2023 (Note: Singapore and Philippines); June 7, 2023	10 episodes	41–49 min	All markets	
Virgin: The Series	Teen drama	Disney+ Hotstar	March 1, 2023	10 episodes	46–57 min	All markets	
Wedding Agreement: The Series	Romantic drama	Disney+ Hotstar	March 15, 2023	2 seasons, 20 episodes	40–69 min	All markets	
Susah Sinyal: The Series	Comedy drama	Disney+ Hotstar	April 5, 2023	12 episodes	36–45 min	Selected territories	
What We Lose to Love	Romantic fantasy drama	Disney+ Hotstar	April 19, 2023	12 episodes	28–34 min	All markets	
Keluarga Cemara: The Series	Coming-of-age drama	Disney+ Hotstar	August 9, 2023	8 episodes	43–47 min	Selected territories	

==== Japanese ====
Title	Genre	Original network	Premiere	Seasons	Runtime	Exclusive region(s)	Notes
Tokyo MER: Mobile Emergency Room	Medical drama	JNN (MBS/TBS)	October 27, 2021; November 12, 2021 (Note: Singapore, South Korea and Taiwan); January 5, 2022	11 episodes	46–60 min	Asia-Pacific	
My Family	Family drama	JNN (MBS/TBS)	May 25, 2022; August 19, 2022	10 episodes	54 min	All markets	
The Files of Young Kindaichi	Mystery/suspense drama	NNS (NTV/ytv)	April 24, 2022; June 1, 2022	1 season, 10 episodes	46–69 min	All markets	
Tomorrow, I'll Be Someone's Girlfriend	Romantic drama	JNN (MBS/TBS)	April 27, 2022; June 15, 2022	2 seasons, 21 episodes	23 min	All markets	
Atom's Last Shot	Video game industry drama	JNN (MBS/TBS)	October 16, 2022	9 episodes	45–69 min	All markets	
Yakuza Lover	Romantic drama	JNN (MBS/TBS)	October 27, 2022	10 episodes	24 min	All markets	
My Home Hero	Suspense mafia drama	JNN (MBS/TBS)	October 25, 2023	10 episodes	23–24 min	Selected territories	
Suspicious Partner	Romantic crime comedy	JNN (MBS/TBS)	April 29, 2025; May 14, 2025	12 episodes	23–24 min	Selected territories	

==== Korean ====
Title	Genre	Original network	Premiere	Seasons	Runtime	Exclusive region(s)	Notes
Snowdrop	Romantic dark comedy	JTBC	December 18, 2021; February 9, 2022	16 episodes	74–100 min	Selected territories	
Crazy Love	Romantic dark comedy	KBS2	March 7, 2022; May 24, 2023	16 episodes	62–69 min	Selected territories	
Going to You at a Speed of 493 km	Romantic sports drama	KBS2	April 27, 2022; May 4, 2022	16 episodes	62–70 min	Selected territories	
Bloody Heart	Romantic period drama	KBS2	May 2, 2022; May 10, 2022	16 episodes	64–71 min	Selected territories	
Doctor Lawyer	Medical-legal drama	MBC TV	June 3, 2022; April 19, 2023	16 episodes	63–64 min	Selected territories	
Link: Eat, Love, Kill	Romantic fantasy comedy drama	tvN	June 6, 2022; June 13, 2022; May 24, 2023	16 episodes	60–72 min	Selected territories	
Adamas	Fantasy crime drama	tvN	July 27, 2022	16 episodes	65–78 min	Selected territories	
Big Mouth	Fantasy crime thriller	MBC TV	July 29, 2022	16 episodes	63–74 min	Selected territories	
The Golden Spoon	Fantasy drama	MBC TV	September 23, 2022	16 episodes	68–80 min	Selected territories	
One Dollar Lawyer	Legal comedy drama	SBS TV	September 23, 2022	12 episodes	58–74 min	Selected territories	
The First Responders	Medical drama	SBS TV	November 12, 2022	2 seasons, 24 episodes	59–70 min	Selected territories	
Pandora: Beneath the Paradise	Revenge drama	tvN	March 11, 2023	16 episodes	62–66 min	Selected territories	
Family: The Unbreakable Bond	Spy comedy drama	tvN	April 17, 2023	12 episodes	66–79 min	Selected territories	
Dr. Romantic (season 3)	Medical drama	SBS TV	April 28, 2023	1 season, 16 episodes	70 min	Selected territories	
Revenant	Mystery horror thriller	SBS TV	June 23, 2023	12 episodes	57–77 min	Selected territories	
Arthdal Chronicles: The Sword of Aramoon (season 2)	Historical fantasy	tvN	September 9, 2023	1 season, 12 episodes	72–78 min	Selected territories	
Unexpected Business (season 3)	Reality show	tvN	October 26, 2023	1 season, 12 episodes	TBA	Selected territories	
Tell Me That You Love Me	Romantic drama	Genie TV (ENA)	November 27, 2023	16 episodes	60–66 min	Selected territories	
Maestra: Strings of Truth	Music melodrama	tvN	December 9, 2023	12 episodes	55–75 min	Selected territories	
Flex X Cop	Action crime comedy	SBS TV	January 26, 2024	1 season, 16 episodes	60–65 min	Selected territories	
Wonderful World	Mystery revenge drama	MBC TV	March 1, 2024	14 episodes	63–73 min	Selected territories	
Chief Detective 1958	Period crime action	MBC TV	April 19, 2024	10 episodes	65–74 min	Selected territories	
Crash	Crime comedy	Genie TV (ENA)	May 13, 2024	1 season, 12 episodes	60–63 min	Selected territories	
My Name Is Gabriel	Reality show	JTBC	June 21, 2024	1 season, 8 episodes	97–118 min	Selected territories	
No Way Out: The Roulette	Mystery thriller	U+ Mobile TV	July 31, 2024	8 episodes	54–61 min	Selected territories	
The Judge from Hell	Dark fantasy legal thriller	SBS TV	September 21, 2024	1 season, 14 episodes	60–74 min	Selected territories	
Jeongnyeon: The Star Is Born	Coming-of-age period drama	tvN	October 12, 2024	16 episodes	61–75 min	Selected territories	
The Fiery Priest (season 2)	Crime drama	SBS TV	November 8, 2024	1 season, 12 episodes	65–88 min	Selected territories	
Love Your Enemy	Romantic comedy	tvN	November 23, 2024	12 episodes	62–74 min	Selected territories	
Buried Hearts	Revenge drama	SBS TV	February 21, 2025	16 episodes	61–75 min	Selected territories	
Our Movie	Melodrama	SBS TV	June 13, 2025	12 episodes	64–72 min	Selected territories	
Law and the City	Legal drama	tvN	July 5, 2025	12 episodes	61–81 min	Selected territories (Note: Co-distribute with tvN Asia for Southeast Asia)	
The Nice Guy	Romantic drama	JTBC	July 18, 2025	14 episodes	60–62 min	Selected territories	
Anchovy Physical Camp	Variety show	Disney+ (Star Hub)	August 22, 2025	1 season, 11 episodes	27–35 min	Selected territories	
60 Minutes to Love	Dating reality show	Disney+ (Star Hub)	August 23, 2025	1 season, 11 episodes	20–27 min	Selected territories	
Twelve	Fantasy action superhero	KBS2	August 23, 2025	8 episodes	49–51 min	Selected territories	
Belly Showdown	Variety show	Disney+ (Star Hub)	August 24, 2025	1 season, 11 episodes	24–35 min	Selected territories	
YOO Got a Minute?	Variety/Talk show	Disney+ (Star Hub)	August 25, 2025	1 season, 11 episodes	25–34 min	Selected territories	
Chef's Go-To	Reality show	Disney+ (Star Hub)	August 26, 2025	1 season, 10 episodes	25–34 min	Selected territories	

==== Portuguese ====
Title	Genre	Original network	Premiere	Seasons	Runtime	Exclusive region(s)	Notes
Insanity	Horror/ psychological thriller	Star+	January 26, 2022	1 season, 8 episodes	32–38 min	All markets	
The King of TV	Biographical drama	Star+	October 19, 2022	2 seasons, 16 episodes	34–62 min	All markets	
Damned Saint	Thriller drama	Star+	February 8, 2023	1 season, 8 episodes	32–42 min	All markets	
Impure (seasons 3–4)	Crime drama	Star+	May 10, 2023	2 seasons, 20 episodes	38–56 min	All markets	(Note: Originally premiered on the Star+ service, which was migrated to Disney+. Additional seasons premiered directly on Disney+.)
Time Switch	Fantasy drama	Star+	May 10, 2023	1 season, 8 episodes	32–39 min	All markets	
Likes for Sale	Comedy	Star+	September 22, 2023	1 season, 5 episodes	28–32 min	All markets	
How to Be a Carioca	Comedy	Star+	October 18, 2023	8 episodes	36–46 min	All markets	
Killer Vacation	Drama thriller	Star+	November 8, 2023	1 season, 8 episodes	34–41 min	Selected territories	
Their Stories	Drama	Star+	December 6, 2023	1 season, 8 episodes	45–55 min	Selected territories	

==== Spanish ====
Title	Genre	Original network	Premiere	Seasons	Runtime	Exclusive region(s)	Notes
Not My Fault: Mexico	Drama	Star+	March 23, 2022	10 episodes	38–47 min	All markets	
Alternative Therapy	Comedy drama	Star+	April 6, 2022	2 seasons, 17 episodes	31–44 min	All markets	
The Heartthrob: TV Changed, He Didn't	Comedy	Star+	June 8, 2022	1 season, 12 episodes	28–39 min	All markets	
Santa Evita	Biopic / period drama	Star+	July 26, 2022	7 episodes	36–47 min	All markets	
Repatriated	Drama	Star+	September 21, 2022	1 season, 10 episodes	33–45 min	All markets	
Limbo	Drama	Star+	September 28, 2022	1 season, 10 episodes	32–42 min	All markets	
The Boss (seasons 1–2)	Comedy drama	Star+	October 26, 2022	2 seasons, 18 episodes	28–32 min	All markets	(Note: Moved to Star (Disney+) for season 3 onward.)
The Stolen Cup	Comedy drama	Star+	November 9, 2022	1 season, 6 episodes	25–33 min	All markets	
The Heir: The Freestyle Dynasty	Reality competition	Star+	January 20, 2023	1 season, 20 episodes	33–43 min	All markets	
Commander Fort	Biographical docuseries	Star+	January 25, 2023	4 episodes	35–62 min	All markets	
Prime Time	Thriller	Star+	February 15, 2023	1 season, 10 episodes	33–44 min	All markets	
Let's Not Talk About It	News magazine	Star+	February 22, 2023	1 season, 7 episodes	25–35 min	All markets	
The Cry of the Butterflies	Historical drama	Star+	March 8, 2023	13 episodes	39–57 min	All markets	
Ringo: Glory and Death	Biopic	Star+	March 24, 2023	7 episodes	30–50 min	All markets	
Mask vs. Knight	Comedy	Star+	April 19, 2023	1 season, 8 episodes	22–26 min	All markets	
Planners	Comedy drama	Star+	May 5, 2023	2 seasons, 13 episodes	30–41 min	All markets	
Los protectores	Sports comedy drama	Star+	June 25, 2023	2 seasons, 15 episodes	31–45 min	All markets	
Pancho Villa: The Centaur of the North	Period drama	Star+	July 19, 2023	10 episodes	38–50 min	All markets	
Butter Man: The Slickest Mexican Thief	True crime drama	Star+	September 13, 2023	8 episodes	24–38 min	Selected territories	
Nothing	Comedy	Star+	October 11, 2023	1 season, 5 episodes	28–25 min	All markets	
I'm Your Fan	Comedy	Star+	November 15, 2023	1 season, 8 episodes	28–30 min	All markets	
Coppola, The Agent	Biopic	Star+	March 15, 2024	1 season, 6 episodes	33–45 min	All markets	
UFO Factory	Science fiction comedy	Star+	April 3, 2024	1 season, 10 episodes	21–27 min	All markets	
La Máquina	Sports drama	Hulu	October 9, 2024	6 episodes	29–53 min	All markets	

==== Other ====
Title	Genre	Original network	Premiere	Seasons	Runtime	Exclusive region(s)	Language	Notes
War of the Worlds (seasons 2–3)	Post-apocalyptic science fiction	Fox	July 16, 2021	2 seasons, 16 episodes	48–50 min	Ireland and United Kingdom	English; French	
Anita (Director's Cut)	Musical biopic	Theatrical release	February 2, 2022; March 9, 2022	5 episodes	45 min	Selected territories	Cantonese	
Special Force: Anarchy	Action crime drama	Disney+ Hotstar	January 14, 2023; June 21, 2023	7 episodes	TBA	Australia, New Zealand, Philippines and Singapore	Malay	
A Little Mood for Love	Melodrama	Hunan TV; Youku	February 1, 2023	40 episodes	45 min	Selected territories	Mandarin	
Joy of Life (season 2)	Slice of life period drama	Tencent Video; CCTV-8	May 16, 2024 (Note: Hong Kong and Taiwan)	1 season, 36 episodes	TBA	Selected territories	Mandarin	

== Original films ==
=== Feature films ===
Title	Genre	Release date	Runtime	Exclusive region(s)	Language
Recep İvedik 7	Comedy	December 9, 2022 (Note: Turkey, Austria, Germany, Switzerland); December 23, 2022 (Note: Rest of Europe); February 10, 2023	2 h 13 min	All markets	Turkish
New Year's Eve	Comedy	December 30, 2022; March 3, 2023	2 h 21 min	All markets	Turkish
The Nightingale of Bursa	Comedy	January 13, 2023; March 10, 2023	2 h	All markets	Turkish
My Apologies	Comedy	April 14, 2023	1 h 50 min	All markets	Turkish
A Place to Fight For	Romantic thriller	July 7, 2023	1 h 34 min	All markets	French
Antigang: La Relève	Action thriller	August 25, 2023	1 h 30 min	Selected territories	French
Cooked	Drama	February 12, 2025	1 h 53 min	Selected territories	Turkish
Another You	Comedy	March 7, 2025	1 h 51 min	Selected territories	Turkish
Pita Hall	Comedy	May 2, 2025	1 h 46 min	Selected territories	Turkish
The Balloonist	Comedy drama	October 3, 2025	1 h 48 min	Selected territories	Dutch

=== Documentaries ===
Title	Subject	Release date	Runtime	Exclusive region(s)	Language
Finding Michael	Search and rescue biopic	March 15, 2023	1 h 40 min	All markets	English
Hideo Kojima: Connecting Worlds	Video games biopic	February 23, 2024	59 min	Selected territories	English

=== Specials ===
Title	Genre	Release date	Runtime	Exclusive region(s)	Language
The Pope: Answers	Interview/dialogue	April 5, 2023	1 h 22 min	All markets	Spanish
PSY Summer Swag 2022	Concert film	May 3, 2023	1 h 26 min	All markets	Korean

=== Exclusive international distribution ===
==== Feature films ====
Title	Genre	Release date	Runtime	Language	Exclusive region(s)
Nomadland	Drama	April 9, 2021; April 30, 2021	1 h 48 min	English	Selected territories
Vacation Friends	Comedy	August 27, 2021	1 h 45 min	English	All markets except Japan and South Korea
Books of Blood	Anthology horror	October 29, 2021; April 1, 2022	1 h 47 min	English	Australia, New Zealand, Germany, Austria, Switzerland, France, United Kingdom, Ireland and Canada
No Exit	Suspense thriller	February 25, 2022	1 h 36 min	English	All markets
Fresh	Dark comedy thriller	March 4, 2022; March 18, 2022; April 15, 2022	1 hr 57 min	English	All markets
Sex Appeal	Teen romantic comedy	March 18, 2022; April 5, 2022; April 8, 2022	1 h 30 min	English	Australia, New Zealand, Canada and Europe
The Eyes of Tammy Faye	Biographical drama	March 22, 2022; March 23, 2022	2 h 6 min	English	Selected territories
Crush	Romantic comedy	April 29, 2022	1 h 33 min	English	All markets
The Valet	Romantic comedy	May 20, 2022	2 h 4 min	English	All markets
Fire Island	Romantic comedy	June 3, 2022; June 17, 2022	1 h 45 min	English	All markets
The Princess	Period action comedy	July 1, 2022	1 h 34 min	English	All markets
Not Okay	Dark comedy	July 29, 2022	1 h 47 min	English	All markets
Prey	Science fiction action horror	August 5, 2022	1 h 39 min	English	All markets
Grimcutty	Horror	October 10, 2022	1 h 41 min	English	All markets
Rosaline	Period romantic comedy	October 14, 2022	1 h 37 min	English	All markets
Matriarch	Horror	October 21, 2022	1 h 25 min	English	All markets
Plan B	Coming-of-age road comedy	December 16, 2022	1 h 48 min	English	All markets
It's a Wonderful Binge	Dystopian holiday satire	December 16, 2022	1 h 38 min	English	All markets
Darby and the Dead	Supernatural teen comedy	January 27, 2023	1 h 40 min	English	All markets
Bruiser	Drama	February 24, 2023	1 h 41 min	English	All markets
Boston Strangler	True crime drama	March 17, 2023	1 h 52 min	English	All markets
Rye Lane	Romance comedy	March 31, 2023	1 h 23 min	English	All markets
Quasi	Period comedy	April 20, 2023	1 h 40 min	English	All markets
Clock	Science fiction horror	April 28, 2023	1 h 33 min	English	All markets
White Men Can't Jump	Sports comedy	May 19, 2023	1 h 42 min	English	All markets
Flamin' Hot	Biographical comedy drama	June 9, 2023	1 h 38 min	English	All markets
Jagged Mind	Horror	August 11, 2023	1 h 28 min	English	All markets
Miguel Wants to Fight	Coming-of-age comedy	August 16, 2023	1 h 15 min	English	All markets
Vacation Friends 2	Comedy	August 25, 2023	1 h 46 min	English	All markets
No One Will Save You	Science fiction horror	September 22, 2023	1 h 33 min	English	All markets
The Mill	Science fiction thriller	October 9, 2023	1 h 46 min	English	All markets
Appendage	Horror	October 18, 2023	1 h 35 min	English	All markets
Quiz Lady	Comedy	November 3, 2023	1 h 40 min	English	All markets
Suncoast	Coming-of-age drama	February 9, 2024	1 h 49 min	English	All markets
Prom Dates	Coming-of-age comedy	May 3, 2024	1 h 25 min	English	All markets
Hold Your Breath	Horror	October 3, 2024	1 h 34 min	English	All markets
O'Dessa	Post-apocalyptic musical drama	March 20, 2025	1 h 46 min	English	All markets
Predator: Killer of Killers	Adult animated science fiction anthology action	June 6, 2025	1 h 26 min	English	All markets
Eenie Meanie	Heist comedy thriller	August 22, 2025	1h 36 min	English	All markets
Swiped	biographical drama	September 19, 2025	1 h 50 min	English	All markets

==== Documentaries ====
Title	Subject	Release date	Runtime	Language	Exclusive region(s)
Summer of Soul	Concert film	July 2, 2021; July 30, 2021; November 19, 2021	1 h 57 min	English	Selected territories (Note: Co-distributed with Searchlight Pictures in selected markets)
Hysterical	Stand-up comedy	August 6, 2021; November 5, 2021	1 h 27 min	English	Selected territories
The Real Queens of Hip-Hop: The Women Who Changed the Game	Music	January 14, 2022	39 min	English	Selected territories
Machine Gun Kelly's Life in Pink	Music	June 27, 2022	1 h 41 min	English	Selected territories
The Sinfluencer of Soho	True crime	July 22, 2022	39 min	English	Selected territories
Women of 9/11: A Special Edition of 20/20 with Robin Roberts	American history	September 9, 2022	1 h 24 min	English	Selected territories
Leave No Trace	True crime	September 16, 2022	1 h 50 min	English	Selected territories
Aftershock	American history	September 30, 2022	1 h 27 min	English	Selected territories
God Forbid: The Sex Scandal That Brought Down a Dynasty	True crime	November 9, 2022	1 h 49 min	English	Selected territories
The Housewife & the Shah Shocker	True crime	December 2, 2022	48 min	English	Selected territories
Queenmaker: The Making of an It Girl	True crime	June 7, 2023	1 h 27 min	English	Selected territories
Anthem	American history	June 28, 2023	1 h 39 min	English	Selected territories
The Randall Scandal: Love, Loathing, and Vanderpump	True crime	August 4, 2023	1 h 24 min	English	Selected territories
Trap Jazz	Music	October 27, 2023	1 h 33 min	English	Selected territories
The Lady Bird Diaries	Biopic	November 13, 2023	1 h 40 min	English	Selected territories
Shohei Ohtani – Beyond the Dream	Sports	November 17, 2023	1 h 39 min	English	Selected territories
Aaron Carter: The Little Prince of Pop	Music	December 27, 2023	56 min	English	Selected territories

==== Specials ====
Title	Genre	Release date	Runtime	Language	Exclusive region(s)
Derek DelGaudio's In & Of Itself	Mentalism	December 31, 2021; February 4, 2022	1 h 30 min	English	All markets
The Paloni Show! Halloween Special	Animated sitcom	October 31, 2022	1 h 2 min	English	All markets
Kate Berlant: Cinnamon in the Wind	Stand-up comedy	December 30, 2022	45 min	English	Selected territories
Byron Bowers	Stand-up comedy	January 20, 2023	58 min	English	Selected territories
AREA21 Live on Planet Earth	Concert film	April 5, 2023	46 min	English	All markets
Imagine Dragons Live in Vegas	Concert	July 30, 2023	2 h	English	All markets
2023 Rock & Roll Hall of Fame Induction Ceremony	Virtual event	January 2, 2024	4 h 22 min	English	All markets

== See also ==
- List of Hulu original programming
  - List of Hulu original films
- List of Disney+ original programming
  - List of Disney+ original films
- List of Star+ original programming, for the former streaming service in Latin America
- List of Disney+ Hotstar original programming, for the streaming service in India and Southeast Asia
  - List of Disney+ Hotstar original films
