= How I Escaped My Cult =

American true crime documentary series

- Genre: Documentary
- Narrated by: Tamron Hall
- Country of origin: United States
- Original language: English
- No. of seasons: 1
- No. of episodes: 10

Production
- Executive producers: David Karabinas; Brad Bernstein; Greg Spring; Ivy Brown; James Macnab; John X. Kim; Ray Dotch; Rick Cikowski; Chip Rives
- Production companies: Texas Crew Productions; Spring Theory

Original release
- Network: Freeform
- Release: February 20 – April 17, 2025

How I Escaped My Cult is a true crime television docuseries. The series premiered on February 20, 2025, on Freeform and Hulu. (Note: Freeform is an America basic cable channel owned and operated by ABC Family Worldwide)

== Episodes ==
No.	Title	Original release date	U.S. viewers (millions)
1	"Tony Alamo Christian Academy"	February 20, 2025	N/A
2	"Angel's Landing"	February 20, 2025	N/A
3	"Word of Life"	February 27, 2025 (Note: These episodes were first released on Hulu on February 21, 2025.)	N/A
4	"Nuwaubian Nation"	March 6, 2025	N/A
5	"The Pilgrims"	March 13, 2025	N/A
6	"La Luz Del Mundo"	March 20, 2025	N/A
7	"Yearning for Zion/FLDS"	March 27, 2025	N/A
8	"NXIVM/The Vow"	April 3, 2025	N/A
9	"The Bergholz Clan"	April 10, 2025	N/A
10	"The House of Yahweh"	April 17, 2025	N/A

Each episode is followed by a public service announcement that reads:

If you or someone you know has experienced sexual violence, you're not alone.
RAINN'S National Sexual Assault Hotline is available with free, confidential 24/7 support at 800-656-HOPE (4873) and online.rainn.org.
For help worldwide, visit findahelpline.com
