= Wayne Brady: The Family Remix =

2024 reality television series

- Genre: Reality
- Starring: Wayne Brady; Mandie Taketa; Maile Brady; Jason Fordham
- Country of origin: United States
- Original language: English
- No. of series: 1
- No. of episodes: 8

Production
- Executive producers: Wayne Brady; Mandie Taketa; Shahram Qureshi; Rachel Tung
- Production companies: Fremantle; A Wayne & Mandie Creative

Original release
- Network: Freeform
- Release: July 24 – September 11, 2024

Wayne Brady: The Family Remix is an American reality television series that premiered on July 24, 2024, on Freeform.

In February 2025, the series was canceled after one season.

== Cast ==
- Wayne Brady
- Mandie Taketa
- Maile Brady
- Jason Fordham

== Production ==
On July 26, 2023, it was announced that Hulu had ordered the series. On March 6, 2024, the series was given the title Wayne Brady: The Family Remix and moved to Freeform. On May 2, 2024, it was announced that the series would premiere on July 24, 2024.

== Episodes ==
No.	Title	Original release date	U.S. viewers (millions)
1	"All Eyez On Me"	July 24, 2024	N/A
2	"Through The Wire"	July 31, 2024	N/A
3	"NY State Of Mind"	August 7, 2024	N/A
4	"Dear Mama"	August 14, 2024	N/A
5	"Keep Ya Head Up"	August 21, 2024	N/A
6	"Feeling Myself"	August 28, 2024	N/A
7	"Ready or Not"	September 4, 2024	N/A
8	"Run This Town"	September 11, 2024	N/A
