= Freak Out (TV series) =

American reality television series

- Genre: Reality
- Country of origin: United States
- Original language: English
- No. of seasons: 1
- No. of episodes: 14

Production
- Running time: 22 minutes

Original release
- Network: ABC Family
- Release: October 21, 2014 – May 27, 2015

Freak Out is an American reality television series where people prank their close friends and family. The show premiered as a two-night one-hour special on October 21 and October 22, 2014. The first season premiered on March 25, 2015 and ended on May 27, 2015.

== Episodes ==
=== Specials (2014) ===
No.	Title	Original release date	US viewers (millions)
1	"Bugs Freak Me Out!"	October 21, 2014	N/A
2	"Stalkers Freak Me Out!"	October 21, 2014	N/A
3	"Exorcisms Freak Me Out!"	October 22, 2014	N/A
4	"Ghosts Freak Me Out!"	October 22, 2014	N/A

=== Season 1 (2015) ===
No.	Title	Original release date	US viewers (millions)
1	"Prison Breaks Freak Me Out!"	March 25, 2015	0.32
2	"Spirit Boards Freak Me Out!"	April 1, 2015	0.23
3	"The Ooze Freaks Me Out!"	April 8, 2015	0.29
4	"Photo Booths Freak Me Out!"	April 15, 2015	0.29
5	"Rodents Freak Me Out!"	April 22, 2015	0.30
6	"Nitrogen Freaks Me Out!"	April 29, 2015	0.12
7	"Flesh Eating Viruses Freak Me Out!"	May 6, 2015	0.20
8	"Aliens Freak Me Out!"	May 13, 2015	0.14
9	"Fire Freaks Me Out!"	May 20, 2015	0.32
10	"Yoga Freaks Me Out!"	May 27, 2015	0.33
