= Las Vegas Garden of Love =

- Genre: Reality television
- Country of origin: United States
- Original language: English
- No. of seasons: 1
- No. of episodes: 10

Production
- Production company: Schmaguuli LLC

Original release
- Network: ABC Family
- Release: March 21 – May 9, 2005

Las Vegas Garden of Love is a reality television series that aired on ABC Family for 10 episodes during mid-2005. It was not given a real ending or a second season, due to very low ratings. It was re-run until fall of 2005.

== Reception ==
The New York Times critic Virginia Heffernan wrote that the television series "looks in this fingernail instant like a 1970's documentary—a staring, verité meditation that will expose the pallid loneliness of the quickie wedding and, in turn, the perfidy of the American dream". Brian Lowry of Variety criticized the show for "exhausting the 'family with weird occupation reality format in record time'", writing, "Someone apparently forgot to watch other reality shows, which capitalize on editing to craft stories."
