= Keep This Between Us =

2022 television documentary series

- Genre: Documentary
- Directed by: Amy Berg; Jenna Rosher; Kristi Jacobson
- Country of origin: United States
- Original language: English
- No. of episodes: 4

Production
- Executive producers: Chad Mumm; Mark W. Olsen; Dana J. Olkkonen; Thalia Mavros; Cheryl Nichols; Ari Basile; Amy Berg; Sarah Gibson
- Production companies: Vox Media Studios; The Front Media

Original release
- Network: Freeform
- Release: August 29 – August 30, 2022

Keep This Between Us is an American four-part television documentary series which premiered on August 29, 2022 on Freeform.

== Production ==
On April 5, 2022, it was announced that Freeform had ordered the series, originally titled Dear Pony: Keep This Between Us which was originally set to premiere on June 15, 2022 before rescheduling to August 29.

== Episodes ==
No.	Title	Directed by	Original release date	U.S. viewers (millions)
1	"Return to Little Elm"	Amy Berg & Jenna Rosher	August 29, 2022	0.10
2	"The Rumors Are True"	Jenna Rosher	August 29, 2022	0.10
3	"Passing the Trash"	Jenna Rosher	August 30, 2022	N/A
4	"The Burden"	Kristi Jacobson	August 30, 2022	N/A
