= Royal Rules of Ohio =

2024 reality television series

- Genre: Reality
- Starring: Thelma Agyekum; Akili Bobo Agyekum; Brenda Agyekum; Delali Agyekum; Nana Agyekum
- Country of origin: United States
- Original language: English
- No. of series: 1
- No. of episodes: 10

Production
- Executive producers: Tara Long; Ben Megargel; Madison Merritt; Kim McKoy; Amy Callahan; Jayson Elmore
- Production location: Columbus, Ohio
- Production company: Lionsgate Television

Original release
- Network: Freeform
- Release: May 15 – July 17, 2024

Royal Rules of Ohio is an American reality television series which premiered on May 15, 2024, on Freeform.

== Cast ==
- Thelma Agyekum
- Akili Bobo Agyekum
- Brenda Agyekum
- Delali Agyekum
- Nana Agyekum

== Production ==
On March 9, 2023, it was announced that Hulu had ordered the series. On September 27, 2023, the series moved to Freeform. On April 11, 2024, it was announced that the series would premiere on May 15, 2024.

== Episodes ==
No.	Title	Original release date	U.S. viewers (millions)
1	"Rule #1: Never Let Your Crown Tilt"	May 15, 2024	N/A
2	"Rule #2: All That Glimmers Better Be Gold"	May 22, 2024	N/A
3	"Rule #3: Gold Never Sweats"	May 29, 2024	N/A
4	"Rule #4: Royals Don't Go Rogue"	June 5, 2024	N/A
5	"Rule #5: Protect The Royal Rep"	June 12, 2024	N/A
6	"Rule #6: Royal Realness Is A Must"	June 19, 2024	N/A
7	"Rule #7: Ruling Isn't Easy"	June 26, 2024	N/A
8	"Rule #8: Heavy Is The Heart That Wears The Crown"	July 3, 2024	N/A
9	"Rule #9: Royals Always Bring It"	July 10, 2024	N/A
10	"Rule #10: Stay Your Own Way"	July 17, 2024	N/A
