= Freeform (TV channel) =

American television channel

- Logo used since September 12, 2022
- Country: United States
- Broadcast area: Nationwide
- Headquarters: Walt Disney Studios, Burbank, California, US

Programming
- Languages: English; Spanish (via SAP audio track)
- Picture format: 720p HDTV

Ownership
- Owner: Disney Entertainment Television
- Parent: ABC Family Worldwide
- Sister channels: List: ABC; Disney Channel; Disney XD; Disney Jr.; FX; FXX; FXM; National Geographic; Nat Geo Wild

History
- Launched: April 29, 1977; 49 years ago
- Former names: CBN Satellite Service/CBN Satellite Network (1977—1981); CBN Cable Network (1981–1988); The CBN Family Channel (1988–1990); The Family Channel (1990–1998); Fox Family Channel (1998–2000); Fox Family (2000–2001); ABC Family (2001–2016)

Links
- Website: freeform.com

Availability

Streaming media
- Affiliated Streaming Service: Disney+ and Hulu
- Streaming services: YouTube TV, Hulu + Live TV, Sling TV, FuboTV, Vidgo, DirecTV Stream

Freeform (known as Fox Family from 1998 to 2001, and ABC Family until 2016) is an American basic cable channel owned and operated by ABC Family Worldwide, a subsidiary of the Disney Entertainment business segment and division of the Walt Disney Company. Freeform primarily broadcasts programming geared towards young adults—with some skewing toward young women—in the 18–34 age range, a target demographic designated by the channel as "becomers". Its programming includes contemporary off-network syndicated reruns and original series, feature films, and made-for-TV original movies. Movies are also shown during seasonal programming blocks, like 31 Nights of Halloween, 30 Days of Disney, and 25 Days of Christmas.

Since the network was launched on April 29, 1977, it has undergone various changes to its programming format and naming under 4 different owners. The network was originally founded as a religious channel, the CBN Satellite Service—an extension of televangelist Pat Robertson's Christian Broadcasting Network. It evolved into a family-focused entertainment network in 1981. It was spun off into a for-profit company known as International Family Entertainment (IFE) in 1990, eventually becoming known as The Family Channel. As a condition of the spin-off, the channel was contractually required to maintain airings of The 700 Club and an annual telethon the last Sunday in January; these conditions have applied to all future owners of the channel.

In 1997, IFE and the Family Channel were acquired by a joint venture between News Corporation and Haim Saban. This resulted in its rebranding as the Fox Family Channel a year later. The new owners wanted to reposition the network toward younger viewers as a companion to Fox Kids Network. The venture was sold to Disney in October 2001 after the network began to struggle as a result of their changes. The channel altered its name to ABC Family one month later on November 10. The network was later rebranded as Freeform on January 12, 2016.

The network's president reports to the chairman of Disney Television Studios, FX Networks and ABC Entertainment.

== History ==
The channel traces its origins to the launch of the CBN Satellite Service (CBN Satellite Network), an arm of Pat Robertson's Christian Broadcasting Network (CBN), on April 29, 1977. Focusing mainly on religious programming, the channel was notable for being one of the first cable channels to distribute its signal nationally through satellite transmission (the third overall, as the method had been first pioneered by HBO in September 1975) as well as the first national basic cable-originated network (TBS – which became the second cable channel in the United States to begin transmitting via satellite in December 1976 – originated as a feed of broadcast television station WTCG (now WPCH-TV) in Atlanta, Georgia). The channel changed its name to the CBN Cable Network on September 1, 1981, and adopted a more secular programming format featuring a mix of family-oriented series and films while retaining some religious programs from various televangelists (mirroring the format used by CBN's independent television stations of that time). Around this time, the channel began airing a late night block of classic family oriented shows like You Bet Your Life with Groucho Marx, I Married Joan, and The Many Loves of Dobie Gillis. This block of programming is said by some to have inspired the 1985 debut of the Nick at Nite classic television block on Nickelodeon. By this point, its carriage grew to 10.9 million homes with a cable television subscription.

On January 1, 1988, the word "Family" was incorporated into the channel's name to better reflect its programming format, rebranding as The CBN Family Channel. By 1990, the network had grown too profitable to remain under the Christian Broadcasting Network umbrella without endangering the ministry's non-profit status. On January 8 of that year, CBN spun out the network into a new, for-profit corporation known as International Family Entertainment (IFE). Managed by Pat Robertson's eldest son Timothy, IFE was co-owned by the Robertsons, with a minority interest held by Liberty Media and Tele-Communications Inc. (TCI) owner John C. Malone. Following the spin-off, the channel's name was officially shortened to The Family Channel on September 15, 1990.

As a stipulation included as part of the spin-out from CBN to International Family Entertainment, The Family Channel was required to continue its daily airings of CBN's flagship program, The 700 Club. This carried on to ABC Family and eventually Freeform, with Freeform gaining attention for snarky disclaimers before airings, which have since been toned down.

As of September 2023, Freeform was available to more than 55 million households in the United States, according to Nielsen estimates. The channel was among several dropped by Charter Spectrum in September 2023 following a carriage dispute with Disney and then restored in September 2025 following a new agreement to offer Hulu.

== Programming ==
Outside of prime time and programming that's part of their contractual obligations with CBN, Freeform (as of October 2026) mostly airs reruns of contemporary comedy series such as Modern Family and Boy Meets World.

The channel also produces some original programming, which as of October 2026 includes shows such as House of Stassi, Million Dollar Nannies, Project Runway, Love Thy Nader, That Thrifting Show with Lara Spencer, Raising Chelsea, Somebody Knows Something, and Coven Academy. Until the debuts of Melissa & Joey (which ran from 2010 to 2015), Baby Daddy (which ran from 2012 to 2017), Young and Hungry (which ran from 2014 to 2018) and Grown-ish (which ran from 2018 to 2024), Freeform (as ABC Family) had long faced minimal success with its original sitcoms, with its drama series often outlasting its comedies.

Freeform airs its original drama series on Monday and/or Tuesday nights, and since 2011 (beginning under the former ABC Family brand), has aired its comedy series on Wednesdays. The channel airs first-run episodes of its original series mainly between January and August, with films generally airing in their place during prime time on the aforementioned nights from September to December (the only exception since 2010, have been annual Halloween episodes of Pretty Little Liars that air as part of the 13 Nights of Halloween in October as well as the debut of the first third of season one (and the only season) of Ravenswood in October 2013), the first ten episodes (or as few as eight for new series) of each season of its original programs air consecutively, the season's remaining episodes are broadcast following a hiatus of four to six months. Dating back to its existence as ABC Family, Freeform typically only reruns episodes of its original series in a marathon that airs prior to a season premiere, mid-season or season finale, or other special occasion, though the channel does air encore presentations of its shows that typically preempt programs that normally air at 7:00 and 10:00 p.m. Eastern Time during the rest of the week on these nights (with the previous week's episode airing in the former time slot prior to the newest episode and a same-night encore of the newest episode on the evening of an episode premiere in the latter time slot).

=== Films ===
Freeform airs movies in prime time on Thursday and Friday nights (and if no original series are scheduled, Mondays, Tuesdays and/or Wednesdays as well), along with a day-long schedule of films on weekends from as early as 7:00 a.m. (sometimes later, such as around 7:30 a.m. or 8:00 a.m.) to as late as 2:00 a.m. Eastern Time on Saturdays and Sundays.

As of 2019, Freeform features a mix of animated and live action films from film divisions Walt Disney Pictures, Walt Disney Animation Studios, Pixar, 20th Century Studios, Searchlight Pictures, Touchstone Pictures, Hollywood Pictures, and Blue Sky Studios.

Freeform also shows sub-runs (runs of films that have already received broadcast or syndicated television airings) of theatrical films from other studios such as Sony Pictures, Universal Pictures, Paramount Pictures (barring Nickelodeon Movies titles), Warner Bros. Pictures, New Line Cinema, HiT Entertainment, Lionsgate, and DreamWorks Pictures.

Freeform has purchased the cable television rights to many film series, such as the Harry Potter series (which ABC and Disney Channel also hold rights to), 2004's A Cinderella Story (and the direct to video sequels, Another Cinderella Story, A Cinderella Story: Once Upon a Song, and A Cinderella Story: If the Shoe Fits) and most recently the Legally Blonde film series (after securing rights to the 2009 made-for-DVD release Legally Blondes).

The channel also produces its own original made-for-TV movies (targeting a slightly older audience than those aired by sister network Disney Channel); some of Freeform's most popular original movies include Night of the Twisters (the channel's first original movie, which premiered in 1996 during its existence as The Family Channel), Holiday in Handcuffs, the Au Pair trilogy, Ice Angel, and Cyberbully (which premiered on the channel under either the Fox Family or ABC Family identities). As Freeform, the channel has had original movies such as Angry Angel, The Truth About Christmas, Life-Size 2, No Sleep 'Til Christmas, Turkey Drop, and Ghosting: The Spirit of Christmas. ABC Family, the channel has also recently been generating high levels of viewers with its weekend movie events; the "Harry Potter Weekend" block in July 2009 generated some of the highest levels of viewers for its weekend events for the year to date. ABC Family's airing of The Hunger Games on October 10, 2014, was one of the channel's most watched telecasts for a single film, being seen by nearly 1.9 million viewers.

Freeform is becoming known for airing previews of upcoming movies, as it has done for Harry Potter and the Order of the Phoenix, Hairspray, and Stardust.

The channel has also aired select Disney Channel Original Movies in recent years, including the 2008 movie Camp Rock the 2011 films Lemonade Mouth and Phineas and Ferb the Movie: Across the 2nd Dimension, and the 2017 movie Descendants 2, which are also four of only five Disney Channel movies to air domestically on a non-Disney Channel branded network. (Cadet Kelly is the other, having aired on The Wonderful World of Disney in 2002.) This has become somewhat more prevalent since the channel's January 2016 rebranding to Freeform, which has also seen the channel air such popular Disney Channel films as High School Musical.

Freeform aired the Olivia Rodrigo film Driving Home 2 U on May 14, 2022. It was the first time that a Disney+ original movie ever aired on Freeform (and thus, any linear television channel).

=== Sports ===
From 2000 to 2001, Fox Family aired a weekly Major League Baseball (MLB) game on Thursday nights during the league's regular season (a game that had previously aired nationwide on Fox Sports Net from 1997 to 1999), as well as select Division Series games. As part of its purchase of Fox Family, in addition to that game, Disney acquired the MLB cable television rights that were also held by Fox Family's then-sister channel FX. ESPN assumed the production responsibilities for the two game packages beginning with the 2002 MLB season, although the game telecasts remained on ABC Family for one additional year, before ESPN struck a deal to move those playoff games to its flagship network starting the following year (although the games aired on Disney-owned networks, Fox kept the exclusive negotiation to renew the contract after the 2006 season; Fox chose not to renew their rights to the Division Series, which went to TBS as part of its new baseball contract). The Division Series games broadcast on the network were simulcast on local broadcast television stations in the home markets of the participating teams.

For the 2020 NFL season, ESPN aired an alternate broadcast of its National Football League (NFL) wild card game on Freeform, alongside simulcasts on ABC, ESPN2, and ESPN Deportes; this marked the first live sports telecast of any kind on the channel since 2002 (when the channel was known as ABC Family).

== Programming blocks ==
=== Current ===
- Funday Weekend – Launched in late 2014, "Funday Weekend" is a two-day event that occurs once a month. During "Funday Weekend", "Funday" usually plays movies from 7:00 a.m. to 2:00 a.m.

=== Seasonal ===
- 30 Days of Disney – In September 2019, the network introduced 30 Days of Disney—an event that features airings of films from Disney properties. The event was sub-divided into themed weeks, including "Villains Week" (highlighting iconic villains from Disney films), "Pirates Week" (featuring the Pirates of the Caribbean franchise), "Singalong Week", and a week highlighting female characters. After a year-long hiatus, the block returned in November 2023, in commemoration of the Walt Disney Company's 100th anniversary. The block ran in June 2024. Since 2024, the block was held in June and November in promotion of a new animated Disney film being released that month.
- 31 Nights of Halloween (originally 13 Days of Halloween and later 13 Nights of Halloween) – The channel aired specials, such as Casper: A Spirited Beginning, Casper Meets Wendy, The Haunting of Seacliff Inn, Lost Souls, Addams Family Reunion, Spiral Staircase, Grave Secrets: The Legacy of Hilltop Drive, The Hollow, When Good Ghouls Go Bad, and Deadly Invasion: The Killer Bee Nightmare. Also aired was the TV series Scariest Places on Earth. Starting in 2006, this holiday lineup shifted towards more family oriented films, such as The Haunted Mansion, The Addams Family, Addams Family Values, Scooby-Doo, Scooby-Doo 2: Monsters Unleashed, Monsters, Inc., Monsters University, and "Harry Potter Weekends" (consisting of the first six Harry Potter films). Hocus Pocus, which rose to the status of a cult film through its showings on the block, has been a featured part of the block for decades, eventually receiving its own marathon within the block in 2017. In 2019, the block began airing The Simpsons Treehouse of Horror after the purchase of 21st Century Fox
- 25 Days of Christmas and Kickoff to Christmas (originally Countdown to 25 Days of Christmas) – The channel has been known for airing many Christmas specials, such as the Rankin-Bass programs The Little Drummer Boy and Santa Claus Is Comin' to Town. It has since expanded this holiday programming, adding made-for-television and theatrically-released movies, a litany of Rankin-Bass sequels (this was complicated somewhat because the broadcast rights of some of the original specials, including Rudolph the Red-Nosed Reindeer and Frosty the Snowman, were still owned by CBS), and other original programming to create "The 25 Days of Christmas". This program block airs in prime time on weekdays and from noon through prime time on weekends from December 1 to 25 each year, and has existed since 1996 under Freeform's previous brands. The block has aired some movies that are not necessarily holiday-related. The "25 Days of Christmas" also features special Christmas episodes of the channel's original series (with seven different shows airing Christmas specials in 2014, including The Fosters, Pretty Little Liars, Chasing Life, Baby Daddy, Switched at Birth, and Melissa and Joey). As of 2019, the "25 Days of Christmas" name is now used for most of its sister channels, such as Disney Junior, Disney Channel, Disney XD, FX Networks and ABC. It competes with the Best Christmas Ever block on AMC.

==== Former ====
- Cable Health Club – In 1994, as The Family Channel, the channel ran programming from sister channel, the Cable Health Club, as part of a daytime block on Monday through Friday mornings, featuring the fitness instruction programs Tamilee Webb and Body by Jake.
- The Game Channel – Premiering on June 7, 1993, The Family Channel debuted a 2½-hour game show block in preparation for the planned launch of the cable channel of roughly the same name (which never launched), featuring reruns of Let's Make a Deal and Name That Tune, as well as two first-run shows based on the board game Trivial Pursuit (both hosted by Wink Martindale). By August of that year, the block was expanded to three hours.
- The Positive Place – Running from 1991 to 1994 on The Family Channel, "The Positive Place" was a weekly block that aired Sunday early evenings (from 6:00 to 8:00 p.m. Eastern Time) featuring first-run episodes and reruns of original and acquired programs (including Rin Tin Tin: K-9 Cop, Maniac Mansion, Big Brother Jake, and Zorro).
- It's Itsy Bitsy Time! – A preschool-oriented block that ran on the Fox Family channel (later ABC Family) from September 1999 until August 2002, airing in both half-hour and hour-long formats. The block featured a selection of children's series primarily imported from Europe, including 64 Zoo Lane, Tom and Vicky, The Animal Shelf, Budgie the Little Helicopter, and Charley and Mimmo.
- ABC Family Action Block / Jetix – The "ABC Family Action Block" debuted on the network in March 2002 (as part of a reduction of its children's programming), featuring various live action and (primarily) animated children's programs such as Medabots, Beyblade, Digimon: Digital Monsters, Daigunder, and Get Ed. The block was rebranded as "Jetix" in February 2004, at the same time that Toon Disney launched its own action-oriented block of the same name. Of its long list of programs, the Power Rangers series was its most successful. ABC Family's Jetix block was discontinued in September 2006, at the same time the companion Toon Disney block was expanded (taking over more than half of that channel's schedule).
- That's So Throwback – Launched in 2015 as a month-long programming stunt, "That's So Throwback" was a block of Disney Channel original programs (similar in format to that network's "Disney Replay" block) that aired Monday through Fridays from 12:00 to 2:00 a.m. Eastern Time. It featured a lineup of five Disney Channel Original Series from the 2000s each Monday through Thursday night (consisting of Even Stevens, That's So Raven, Hannah Montana, Wizards of Waverly Place and even Kim Possible), with a select Disney Channel Original Movie from the late 1990s and 2000s airing on Fridays.
- Family Guy Fridays – Launched on January 3, 2020, and then discontinued on April 26, 2024, and then returning on July 5, 2024, "Family Guy Fridays" is a weekly block that airs marathons of Family Guy. It currently airs Fridays from 1:00 p.m. to 11:00 p.m.

== Freeform Studios ==
ProdCo, Inc.
- Trade name: Freeform Studios
- Formerly: ABC Family Productions (2007–2016); Freeform Original Productions (2016–2018)
- Type: Subsidiary
- Industry: Television
- Predecessor: Fox Family Channel
- Founded: August 14, 2007; 19 years ago
- Key people: Jayne Bieber (SVP, Production Management and Operations)
- Parent: ABC Family Worldwide Inc.

Freeform Studios, the DBA of ProdCo, Inc., formerly known as ABC Family Productions, later Freeform Original Productions is the in-house production company of ABC Family Worldwide Inc. for original scripted series.

Programming executive Linda Mancuso died in December 2003. In early 2004, Disney Channel original programming leaders, executive vice president of original programming and production Gary Marsh and original movies VP Michael Healy took over ABC Family's original movies unit. They moved away from the planned romantic comedies to green light two telefilms, Crimes of Fashion and Head Rush.

ProdCo was incorporated on August 14, 2007. Jayne Bieber was hired as vice president of production in 2010. As of June 2015, Bieber is Vice President, Production Management and Operations, ABC Family over seeing ProdCo.

In October 2015, ABC Family, ABC Studios and ABC Signature signed a two-year production deal with McG's production banner, Wonderland Sound & Vision. Prior, McG had just put two series in at ABC Family. In January 2016, ABC Family changed its name to Freeform.

=== Filmography ===
Television films

Title	Year	Notes
Beautiful Girl	October 19, 2003	
Celeste in the City	March 14, 2004	
Love Rules	June 6, 2004	
Crimes of Fashion	July 25, 2004	
Pop Rocks!	September 12, 2004	originally titled Head Rush
Searching for David's Heart	November 21, 2004	
Snow	December 13, 2004	
I Do, They Don't	March 20, 2005	
Pizza My Heart	July 24, 2005	
Campus Confidential	August 21, 2005	co-production with Firm Films
The Initiation of Sarah	October 22, 2006	co-production with MGM Television

Television series

Title	Years	Network	Notes
Big Brother Jake	1990–1994	The Family Channel	
That's My Dog	1991–1995	The Family Channel	co-production with Albert Wallace Enterprises and NorthStar Entertainment Group (Note: The first two seasons are currently owned by the Christian Broadcasting Network.)
Baby Races	1993–1994	The Family Channel	co-production with Robert Sherman Productions
All-New Captain Kangaroo	1998–1999	Fox Family Channel	season 2
Mister Moose's Fun Time	1998–1999	Fox Family Channel	
Famous Families	1998–1999	Fox Family Channel	co-production with Glen Avenue Films, Foxstar Productions and Fox Television Studios
The New Addams Family	1998–1999	Fox Family Channel; YTV	co-production with Saban Entertainment and Shavick Entertainment
World Gone Wild	1999–2000	Fox Family Channel	co-production with 20th Century Fox Television
Scariest Places on Earth	2000–2002	Fox Family/ABC Family	
State of Grace	2001–2002	Fox Family/ABC Family	
My Life Is a Sitcom	2003–2004	ABC Family	
The Brendan Leonard Show	2003	ABC Family	
Switched!	2003–2004	ABC Family	co-production with Evolution Media and Charles Cook Productions
Knock First	2003–2004	ABC Family	co-production with Scout Productions
Switched Up!	2004	ABC Family	
Las Vegas Garden of Love	2005	ABC Family	
Brat Camp	2005	ABC Family	
Venus and Serena: For Real	2005	ABC Family	
Kicked Out	2005	ABC Family	
Looks of Love	2006	ABC Family	
Back on Campus	2006	ABC Family	
Lincoln Heights	2007–2009	ABC Family	
GRΣΣK	2007–2011	ABC Family	co-production with Piller/Sagan Company
The Middleman	2008	ABC Family	
The Secret Life of the American Teenager	2008–2013	ABC Family	co-production with Brendavision! and American Teenager Inc.
Make It or Break It	2009–2012	ABC Family	as ProdCo Original co-production with Pirates Cove Entertaining and Hollycake (season 2)
Roommates	2009	ABC Family	co-production with Acme Productions
10 Things I Hate About You	2009–2010	ABC Family	
Huge	2010	ABC Family	co-production with Dooley & Company Productions, Half Full Entertainment and Alloy Entertainment
Melissa & Joey	2010–2015	ABC Family	co-production with Hartbreak Films and JL Veritas
Switched at Birth	2011–2017	ABC Family/Freeform	
The Nine Lives of Chloe King	2011	ABC Family	
Jane by Design	2012	ABC Family	
Bunheads	2012–2013	ABC Family	
Beverly Hills Nannies	2012	ABC Family	co-production with Evolution Media
Baby Daddy	2012–2017	ABC Family/Freeform	co-production with Don't Borrow Trouble
The Fosters	2013–2018	ABC Family/Freeform	co-production with Blazing Elm Entertainment, Nitelite Entertainment and Nuyorican Productions
Twisted	2013–2014	ABC Family	
Chasing Life	2014–2015	ABC Family	
Mystery Girls	2014	ABC Family	
Freak Out	2014–2015	ABC Family	
Young & Hungry	2014–2018	ABC Family/Freeform	co-production with CBS Studios, The Tannembaum Company, Critical Content, Waffle Toaster Productions and Blondie Girl Productions
Stitchers	2015–2017	ABC Family/Freeform	
Becoming Us	2015	ABC Family	co-production with Ryan Seacrest Productions and Three Sisters Inc.
Job or No Job	2015	ABC Family	co-production with Studio Lambert and All3Media America
Next Step Realty: NYC	2015	ABC Family	co-production with Lincoln Square Productions
Startup U	2015	ABC Family	co-production with Ugly Brother Studios
Kevin from Work	2015	ABC Family	co-production with Wonderland Sound and Vision, Kapital Entertainment and 40 or 50 Years, Inc.
Shadowhunters	2016–2019	Freeform	co-production with Constantin Film
Recovery Road	2016	Freeform	co-production with Pilgrim Studios
Guilt	2016	Freeform	co-production with Lionsgate Television
Beyond	2017–2018	Freeform	co-production with Automatik and Imperative Entertainment
Truth & Iliza	2017	Freeform	co-production with Avalon Television
Alone Together	2018	Freeform	
Siren	2018–2020	Freeform	previously titled The Deep co-production with Stockton Drive, Inc.
Disney's Fairy Tale Weddings	2018–2020	Freeform/Disney+	co-production with T Group Productions
Good Trouble	2019–2024	Freeform	co-production with J.J Productions, Nuyorican Productions and Blazing Blm Entertainment
Party of Five	2020	Freeform	co-production with Pamplona Productions, Mad Ben Productions, and Sony Pictures Television
Everything's Gonna Be Okay	2020–2021	Freeform	co-production with Avalon Television
Motherland: Fort Salem	2020–2022	Freeform	co-production with Gary Sanchez Productions, Hyperobject Industries and Well Underway
Love in the Time of Corona	2020	Freeform	co-production with Anonymous Content
Kal Penn Approves This Message	2020	Freeform	co-production with Embassy Row
Cruel Summer	2021–2023	Freeform	co-production with Entertainment One (distributor) and Iron Ocean Productions
The Deep End	2022	Freeform	co-production with The Documentary Group
Keep This Between Us	2022	Freeform	co-production with Vox Media Studios and The Front Media
The Come Up	2022	Freeform	co-production with Cousins
Love Trip: Paris	2023	Freeform	
Grand Cayman: Secrets in Paradise	2024	Freeform	co-production with Haymaker East and This Way Out Media
Royal Rules of Ohio	2024	Freeform	co-production with Entertainment One
Sasha Reid and the Midnight Order	2024	Freeform	co-production with XTR
Wayne Brady: The Family Remix	2024	Freeform	

== Related services ==
Service	Description
Freeform HD	Freeform HD is a high definition simulcast feed of Freeform that broadcasts in the 720p format (the preferred HD resolution for the Walt Disney Company's television properties); it was launched as ABC Family HD in early 2008. All of the network's original series and made-for-TV films, and many of its acquired programs are currently produced in high definition, which are presented in a letterboxed format on the standard definition channel; films airing on the channel are also broadcast in HD whenever possible. The vast majority of pay-TV providers carry the network.
Freeform On Demand	Freeform On Demand is the channel's video-on-demand service, offering recent episodes of the channel's original series and select made-for-TV movies to digital cable and IPTV providers. Freeform On Demand's rotating program selection incorporates select new titles that are added the day after a program's original episode airdate (or every two weeks for its original movie selections), alongside existing program titles held over from the previous two weeks.
Freeform App	The Freeform mobile app (formerly known as Watch Freeform) allows subscribers to Freeform on participating television providers to stream Freeform programming live or on-demand. It launched on January 7, 2014, replacing the original ABC Family app on mobile devices. On August 23, 2024, Disney began notifying its carriage partners that it would discontinue the mobile and digital media player apps for Freeform, along with ABC, DisneyNow, FX, and National Geographic, effective September 23. However, TV Everywhere content would still be available via their respective websites in order to funnel viewers towards Disney+ and Hulu.
Hulu	The network also makes mention of the programming the network offers streaming on Hulu, which through its part-ownership by the Walt Disney Company has full season "stacking rights" to several of the network's self-produced series since the network's "ABC Family; a new kind of family" era, excluding series such as Pretty Little Liars, Shadowhunters and The Fosters that have instead been licensed to Netflix.

=== International versions ===
==== ABC Spark (Canada) ====
On October 26, 2011, the Walt Disney Company and Toronto-based media company Corus Entertainment entered into a partnership to launch a Canadian version of ABC Family, ABC Spark, which launched on March 23, 2012. The channel, which is licensed by the Canadian Radio-Television and Telecommunications Commission as a Category B specialty channel (which under CRTC rules, allows Canadian digital cable and direct-broadcast satellite providers to optionally choose to carry the channel), is aimed at teenagers and young adults between 15 and 34 years of age.

The ABC Spark name was purposefully chosen to avoid conflicts with premium service Family Channel. Before the exclusive Canadian television rights to their programming formally transferred to Corus in January 2016 (through a broader deal struck in April 2015 that involved the launches of domestic English and French language versions of the three channels as sisters to ABC Spark), Family maintained a licensing agreement with Disney Channels Worldwide that gave it territorial rights to the programming libraries of Disney Channel, Disney Junior (as well as its predecessor preschool programming block, Playhouse Disney), and Disney XD (Allarcom and First Choice first proposed the "Family Channel" name for the Canadian service in 1987, and jointly launched it in September 1988, one month after the American channel changed its name to The CBN Family Channel).

While ABC Spark did not follow the lead of its American counterpart and change its name to Freeform, it did adopt similar branding elements.

On September 1, 2025, Corus confirmed that it would continue to air Disney content on its English-language counterpart, with some of ABC Spark's programming moving to Slice and W Network. The last program to air before its closure was the 2012 film This Is 40, after which the channel switched to a slate stating "This channel is no longer available".

==== The Family Channel/Challenge (United Kingdom) ====
In 1993, International Family Entertainment, in partnership with Flextech, launched an international version of The Family Channel in the United Kingdom, featuring a mix of original family-oriented programming, reruns of American series and programming from the MTM Enterprises/TVS library. In April 1996, International Family Entertainment sold its 61% controlling interest to Flextech, giving that company full control of the channel. On February 3, 1997, the network was relaunched as Challenge TV, which changed the network's primary focus to game shows.
