= List of Disney+ original programming =

Disney+ is an over-the-top subscription video on-demand service owned by the Disney Entertainment division of the Walt Disney Company which launched in the United States on November 12, 2019. This article lists original television programming from Disney Branded Television, National Geographic and divisions of Walt Disney Studios including 20th Century Studios, Pixar, Marvel Studios, and Lucasfilm that have premiered on the streaming service.

== Current programming ==
=== Drama ===
| Title | Genre | Premiere | Seasons | Runtime | Status |
|---|---|---|---|---|---|
| Ahsoka | Space opera | August 22, 2023 | 1 season, 8 episodes | 37–57 min | Season 2 due to premiere on January 20, 2027 |
| Percy Jackson and the Olympians | Fantasy adventure | December 19, 2023 | 3 seasons, 24 episodes | 33–49 min | Season 3 ongoing |
| Daredevil: Born Again | Superhero/Action legal drama | March 4, 2025 | 2 seasons, 17 episodes | 42–60 min | Renewed for final season |

=== Comedy ===
| Title | Genre | Premiere | Seasons | Runtime | Status |
Awaiting release
| Oswald | Live-action animated comedy | February 17, 2027 | 3 episodes | TBA | Miniseries |

=== Animation ===
| Title | Genre | Premiere | Seasons | Runtime | Status |
|---|---|---|---|---|---|
| X-Men '97 | Superhero drama | March 20, 2024 | 2 seasons, 19 episodes | 28–43 min | Season 3 due to premiere in 2027; Renewed |
| Your Friendly Neighborhood Spider-Man | Superhero comedy | January 29, 2025 | 1 season, 10 episodes | 28–30 min | Season 2 due to premiere on January 13, 2027; Renewed |
| Marvel Zombies | Superhero horror | September 24, 2025 | 1 season, 4 episodes | 32–38 min | Renewed |
| Star Wars: Maul – Shadow Lord | Space opera | April 6, 2026 | 1 season, 10 episodes | 22–30 min | Season 2 due to premiere in 2027 |
| The Doomies | Supernatural adventure comedy | June 26, 2026 | 1 season, 22 episodes | 23–26 min | Pending |

=== Unscripted ===
==== Docuseries ====
| Title | Subject | Premiere | Seasons | Runtime | Status |
|---|---|---|---|---|---|
| The Imagineering Story | Behind the scenes | November 12, 2019 | 1 season, 6 episodes | 62–69 min | Renewed |
| Behind the Attraction | Theme parks | July 21, 2021 | 3 seasons, 18 episodes | 38–50 min | Pending |

=== Shorts ===
These are shows where the majority of the episodes has a runtime of less than 20 minutes.

| Title | Genre | Premiere | Seasons | Runtime | Status |
|---|---|---|---|---|---|
| Short Circuit | Animation anthology | January 24, 2020 | 3 seasons, 22 episodes | 5–8 min | Pending |
| Disney's Launchpad | Anthology series | May 28, 2021 | 2 seasons, 12 episodes (Note: Each "episode" is listed as a separate entry on Disney+, rather than as part of a series.) | 14–21 min | Renewed |

=== Non-English language ===
| Title | Genre | Premiere | Seasons | Runtime | Language | Status |
|---|---|---|---|---|---|---|
| Are You Sure?! | Travel docuseries | August 8, 2024 | 2 seasons, 16 episodes | 56–115 min | Korean | Pending |
| Disney Twisted-Wonderland: The Animation | Fantasy anime | October 29, 2025 | 1 season, 8 episodes | 26−29 min | Japanese | Season 2 due to premiere on December 23, 2026; Renewed |
| The Worst Trip Around the World | Travel docuseries | November 7, 2025 | 1 season, 8 episodes | 34–43 min | Spanish | Renewed |
| O11CE: New Generation | Teen sports drama | March 18, 2026 | 1 season, 20 episodes | 28–30 min | Spanish | Pending |
| Travis Japan Summer Vacation! ! in the USA | Travel docuseries | May 1, 2026 | 1 season, 10 episodes | 38–60 min | Japanese | Pending |
| King & Prince: Our Meet-Up in LA | Travel docuseries | June 17, 2026 | 1 season, 9 episodes | 24–25 min | Japanese | Pending |
| Soy Luna: Let's Roll Again | Musical teen drama | July 24, 2026 | 1 season, 12 episodes | 26–36 min | Spanish | Pending |

=== Regional original programming ===
These shows are originals because Disney+ commissioned or acquired them and had their premiere on the service, but they are only available in specific Disney+ territories.

==== Unscripted ====
| Title | Subject | Premiere | Seasons | Runtime | Language | Exclusive region(s) | Status |
|---|---|---|---|---|---|---|---|
| Food Samouraï | Food | September 30, 2026 (Note: North America) | 1 season, 6 episodes | 28–30 min | French; Japanese | Canada, France and United States | Pending |

==== Co-productions ====
These titles have been commissioned in partnership with another network or with another Disney asset but may not be listed as Disney+ Originals. Availability may vary across regions.

| Title | Genre | Partner/Region | Premiere | Seasons | Runtime | Language | Exclusive region(s) | Status |
|---|---|---|---|---|---|---|---|---|
| The Voice Brasil (season 13) | Reality competition | SBT/Brazil | October 6, 2025 | 1 season, 12 episodes | 69−91 min | Portuguese | Brazil | Pending |
| Lucky Luke | Action adventure comedy Western | France 2/France | March 23, 2026 | 1 season, 8 episodes | 32–36 min | French | Selected territories | Pending |

==== Continuations ====
| Title | Genre | Premiere | Seasons | Runtime | Previous network(s) | Language | Exclusive region(s) | Status |
|---|---|---|---|---|---|---|---|---|
| Dancing with the Stars (seasons 31–34) (Note: Season 31 was exclusively released on Disney+. Episodes of seasons 32 onward premiered concurrently on Disney+ and ABC.) | Reality competition | September 19, 2022 | 4 seasons, 57 episodes | 115–121 min | ABC | English | North America | Renewed |
| Italia's Got Talent (seasons 13–14) | Reality competition | September 1, 2023 | 2 seasons, 18 episodes | 49–162 min | Canale 5 (seasons 1–5); Sky Uno/TV8 (seasons 6–12) | Italian | Italy | Pending |

=== Exclusive international distribution ===
These television shows are shows that have aired in different countries and where Disney+ has exclusive distribution rights to stream them in another territory. The list does not include shows from Disney Channel and Disney XD, as they serve as Disney+ Original or exclusive series in regions where Disney Channel and/or Disney XD are unavailable.

| Title | Genre | Original network/Region | Premiere date | Seasons | Runtime | Exclusive region(s) | Language | Status |
|---|---|---|---|---|---|---|---|---|
| Traveling with Snow Man | Travel documentary | Nippon TV/Japan | July 27, 2025 | 1 season, 10 episodes | 38 min | All markets except Japan | Japanese | Pending |
| Moonlit Reunion | Romantic fantasy | Tencent Video/China | August 26, 2025 | 1 season, 38 episodes | 41−48 min | Selected territories | Mandarin | Pending |
| ESPN Jeopardy! | Game show | ESPN+/United States | July 31, 2026 | 1 season, 10 episodes | 42 min | Latin America | English | Renewed |
| Coven Academy | Supernatural teen drama | Freeform/United States | October 2, 2026 | 1 season, 21 episodes | 12–21 min | All markets except United States | English | Renewed |

== Upcoming original programming ==
=== Drama ===
| Title | Genre | Premiere | Seasons | Runtime | Status |
|---|---|---|---|---|---|
| Afterlife with Archie | Zombie apocalypse | October 2027 | TBA | TBA | Series order |
| Zodiac | Spy thriller | 2028 | TBA | TBA | Series order |

=== Comedy ===
| Title | Genre | Premiere | Seasons | Runtime | Status |
|---|---|---|---|---|---|
| Glee (Note: Co-distributing with Hulu.) | Musical comedy drama | TBA | TBA | TBA | Series order |

=== Animation ===
| Title | Genre | Premiere | Seasons | Runtime | Status |
|---|---|---|---|---|---|
| Pokémon Tales: The Misadventures of Sirfetch'd & Pichu | Comedy | 2027 | TBA | TBA | In production |
| Messi and the Giants | Fantasy comedy | Mid-2027 | TBA | TBA | In production |
| Warrior Cats | Fantasy | 2028 | TBA | TBA | In production |
| Artemis Fowl | Fantasy | TBA | TBA | TBA | Series order |
| Darkwing Duck | Superhero crime comedy | TBA | TBA | TBA | Series order |
| Journey | Fantasy musical | TBA | TBA | TBA | Series order |
| Kingdom Hearts: The Series | Fantasy anime | TBA | TBA | TBA | Series order |

=== Unscripted ===
==== Docuseries ====
| Title | Subject | Premiere | Seasons | Runtime | Status |
|---|---|---|---|---|---|
| Untitled Australia SailGP Team docuseries | Sports | TBA | TBA | TBA | Series order |

=== Non-English language ===
| Title | Genre | Premiere | Seasons | Runtime | Language | Status |
|---|---|---|---|---|---|---|
| Mejores enemigas | Teen drama telenovela | December 2026 | TBA | TBA | Spanish | Filming |
| Passinho: O Ritmo dos Sonhos | Drama | TBA | 1 season, 8 episodes | TBA | Portuguese | Filming |
| Tarã | Fantasy drama | TBA | 1 season, 8 episodes | TBA | Portuguese | Filming |

=== Regional original programming ===
These shows are originals because Disney+ commissioned or acquired them and are scheduled to have their premiere on the service, and they may not be available in all Disney+ territories.

| Title | Genre | Premiere | Seasons | Runtime | Language | Exclusive region(s) | Status |
|---|---|---|---|---|---|---|---|
| The War Between the Land and the Sea (Note: Co-production with BBC One) | Science fiction miniseries | 2027 | 5 episodes | TBA | English | All territories except Ireland and United Kingdom | Awaiting release |

=== In development ===
| Title | Genre |
|---|---|
| Animorphs | Science fiction teen drama |
| Aquamarine | Fantasy |
| Casper | Supernatural fantasy |
| The Curse Workers | Fantasy |
| Eerie Prep | Young adult supernatural drama |
| Ella Enchanted | Fantasy |
| Eragon | Fantasy |
| The Kane Chronicles | Fantasy |
| LALA IRL | Teen drama |
| The Last Kids on Earth | Apocalyptic adventure comedy |
| Mech Cadets | Science fiction |
| The Mickey Mouse Club | Variety show |
| Spaceship Earth | Science fiction teen drama |
| Spy School | Spy drama |
| Tink | Fantasy |
| Untitled Cinderella series | Musical fairytale |

== Ended programming ==
These shows have either completed their runs or Disney+ stopped producing episodes. A show is also assumed to have ended if there has been no confirmed news of renewal at least one year after the show's last episode was released.

=== Drama ===
| Title | Genre | Premiere | Finale | Seasons | Runtime | Notes |
|---|---|---|---|---|---|---|
| The Mandalorian | Space western | November 12, 2019 | April 19, 2023 | 3 seasons, 24 episodes | 33–59 min | |
| The Right Stuff | Historical drama | October 9, 2020 | November 20, 2020 | 1 season, 8 episodes | 46–53 min | (Note: These shows were available at a time as Disney+ originals, but have been since removed from the service.) |
| WandaVision | Superhero romantic comedy drama | January 15, 2021 | March 5, 2021 | 9 episodes | 31–51 min | (Note: Miniseries) |
| The Falcon and the Winter Soldier | Superhero buddy action-adventure | March 19, 2021 | April 23, 2021 | 6 episodes | 51–62 min | |
| Loki | Superhero fantasy action-adventure | June 9, 2021 | November 9, 2023 | 2 seasons, 12 episodes | 44–59 min | |
| The Mysterious Benedict Society | Mystery adventure | June 25, 2021 | December 7, 2022 | 2 seasons, 16 episodes | 39–59 min | (Note: Selected episodes of these Disney+ original programs premiered on other Disney-owned linear networks.) |
| Hawkeye | Superhero action-adventure | November 24, 2021 | December 22, 2021 | 6 episodes | 42–62 min | |
| The Book of Boba Fett | Space western | December 29, 2021 | February 9, 2022 | 7 episodes | 40–62 min | |
| Moon Knight | Superhero fantasy action-adventure | March 30, 2022 | May 4, 2022 | 6 episodes | 45–54 min | |
| Obi-Wan Kenobi | Space opera | May 27, 2022 | June 22, 2022 | 6 episodes | 39–56 min | |
| Andor | Space opera | September 21, 2022 | May 13, 2025 | 2 seasons, 24 episodes | 38–60 min | |
| Willow | Fantasy adventure | November 30, 2022 | January 11, 2023 | 1 season, 8 episodes | 46–60 min | |
| National Treasure: Edge of History | Action-adventure | December 14, 2022 | February 8, 2023 | 1 season, 10 episodes | 45–51 min | |
| The Crossover | Sports drama | April 5, 2023 | | 1 season, 8 episodes | 26–36 min | |
| Secret Invasion | Superhero spy action-thriller | June 21, 2023 | July 26, 2023 | 6 episodes | 38–58 min | |
| Echo | Superhero action | January 9, 2024 | | 5 episodes | 36–50 min | |
| Renegade Nell | Swashbuckler fantasy adventure | March 29, 2024 | | 1 season, 8 episodes | 38–55 min | |
| The Acolyte | Space opera | June 4, 2024 | July 16, 2024 | 1 season, 8 episodes | 35–49 min | |
| Star Wars: Skeleton Crew | Space opera | December 2, 2024 | January 14, 2025 | 8 episodes | 32–49 min | |
| Ironheart | Superhero action | June 24, 2025 | July 1, 2025 | 6 episodes | 42–60 min | |
| VisionQuest | Superhero action | October 13, 2026 | November 10, 2026 | 8 episodes | 47–55 min | |

=== Comedy ===
| Title | Genre | Premiere | Finale | Seasons | Runtime | Notes |
|---|---|---|---|---|---|---|
| High School Musical: The Musical: The Series | Musical/mockumentary | November 12, 2019 | August 9, 2023 | 4 seasons, 38 episodes | 31–64 min | |
| Diary of a Future President | Comedy drama | January 17, 2020 | August 18, 2021 | 2 seasons, 20 episodes | 27–36 min | |
| The Mighty Ducks: Game Changers | Sports comedy drama | March 26, 2021 | November 30, 2022 | 2 seasons, 20 episodes | 27–43 min | |
| Big Shot | Sports comedy drama | April 16, 2021 | October 12, 2022 | 2 seasons, 20 episodes | 32–54 min | |
| Turner & Hooch | Buddy cop action-comedy | July 21, 2021 | October 6, 2021 | 1 season, 12 episodes | 46–53 min | |
| Doogie Kameāloha, M.D. | Medical comedy drama | September 8, 2021 | March 31, 2023 | 2 seasons, 20 episodes | 30–41 min | |
| Just Beyond | Supernatural comedy anthology | October 13, 2021 | | 1 season, 8 episodes | 26–35 min | |
| Ms. Marvel | Superhero action-comedy | June 8, 2022 | July 13, 2022 | 6 episodes | 41–52 min | |
| She-Hulk: Attorney at Law | Superhero legal comedy | August 18, 2022 | October 13, 2022 | 9 episodes | 31–38 min | |
| The Santa Clauses | Fantasy comedy | November 16, 2022 | December 6, 2023 | 2 seasons, 12 episodes | 30–37 min | |
| The Muppets Mayhem | Musical/puppetry | May 10, 2023 | | 1 season, 10 episodes | 26–32 min | |
| American Born Chinese | Action comedy | May 24, 2023 | | 1 season, 8 episodes | 32–45 min | |
| Goosebumps | Horror comedy anthology | October 13, 2023 | January 10, 2025 | 2 seasons, 18 episodes | 37–48 min | (Note: These shows premiered on the service without the Disney+ Original billing, but are listed as originals on disneyplus.com/whats-on) (Note: These shows' seasons are listed as separate entries on the service.) |
| Agatha All Along | Supernatural superhero dark comedy | September 18, 2024 | October 30, 2024 | 9 episodes | 32–50 min | |
| Wonder Man | Superhero action comedy | January 27, 2026 | | 1 season, 8 episodes | 26–36 min | |

=== Animation ===
| Title | Genre | Premiere | Finale | Seasons | Runtime | Notes |
|---|---|---|---|---|---|---|
| Star Wars: The Bad Batch | Space opera | May 4, 2021 | May 1, 2024 | 3 seasons, 47 episodes | 23–76 min | |
| Monsters at Work | Fantasy comedy | July 7, 2021 | September 1, 2021 | 1 season, 10 episodes | 27–30 min | (Note: These shows moved to other channels for first-run episodes from the next season onward.) |
| Chip 'n' Dale: Park Life | Comedy | July 28, 2021 | May 22, 2024 | 2 seasons, 30 episodes | 23 min | |
| What If...? | Superhero anthology | August 11, 2021 | December 29, 2024 | 3 seasons, 26 episodes | 28–38 min | |
| The Proud Family: Louder and Prouder | Comedy | February 23, 2022 | July 29, 2026 | 4 seasons, 39 episodes | 25–32 min | |
| Moon Girl and Devil Dinosaur | Superhero comedy drama | February 15, 2023 | February 7, 2025 | 2 seasons, 41 episodes | 22–44 min | |
| Star Wars: Young Jedi Adventures | Space opera | May 4, 2023 | December 8, 2025 | 3 seasons, 55 episodes | 26–27 min | |
| Iwájú | Science fiction drama | February 28, 2024 | | 6 episodes | 20–26 min | |
| Lego Star Wars: Rebuild the Galaxy | Space opera | September 13, 2024 | September 19, 2025 | 2 seasons, 8 episodes | 25–27 min | |
| Dream Productions | Comedy | December 11, 2024 | | 4 episodes | 27–31 min | |
| Win or Lose | Comedy drama | February 19, 2025 | March 12, 2025 | 8 episodes | 22−33 min | |
| Eyes of Wakanda | Superhero anthology | August 1, 2025 | | 4 episodes | 30−32 min | |
| Lego Marvel Avengers: Strange Tails | Animation | November 14, 2025 | | 2 episodes | 26 min | |
| Star Wars: Visions Presents – The Ninth Jedi | Space opera anthology | August 5, 2026 | | 8 episodes | 22–32 min | |

=== Unscripted ===
==== Docuseries ====
| Title | Subject | Premiere | Finale | Seasons | Runtime | Notes |
|---|---|---|---|---|---|---|
| Marvel's Hero Project | Community service | November 12, 2019 | March 20, 2020 | 1 season, 20 episodes | 25–29 min | |
| The World According to Jeff Goldblum | Culture | November 12, 2019 | January 19, 2022 | 2 seasons, 22 episodes | 22–31 min | |
| Pick of the Litter | Animals | December 20, 2019 | January 24, 2020 | 1 season, 6 episodes | 28–36 min | |
| Prop Culture | Filmmaking | May 1, 2020 | | 1 season, 8 episodes | 29–37 min | |
| It's a Dog's Life with Bill Farmer | Animals | May 15, 2020 | July 17, 2020 | 1 season, 10 episodes | 22–24 min | |
| Rogue Trip | Travel | July 24, 2020 | | 1 season, 6 episodes | 35–39 min | |
| Becoming | Biography | September 18, 2020 | | 1 season, 10 episodes | 25–26 min | |
| Magic of Disney's Animal Kingdom | Nature | September 25, 2020 | January 4, 2023 | 2 seasons, 18 episodes | 36–45 min | |
| Meet the Chimps | Nature | October 16, 2020 | | 1 season, 6 episodes | 35–42 min | |
| Marvel's 616 | Comic book industry/Filmmaking | November 20, 2020 | | 1 season, 8 episodes | 40–72 min | |
| On Pointe | Ballet | December 18, 2020 | | 1 season, 6 episodes | 39–53 min | |
| Secrets of the Whales | Nature | April 22, 2021 | | 4 episodes | 47–51 min | |
| Growing Up Animal | Nature | August 18, 2021 | | 1 season, 6 episodes | 48–54 min | |
| Among the Stars | Science | October 6, 2021 | | 6 episodes | 41–54 min | |
| The Beatles: Get Back | Music | November 25, 2021 | November 27, 2021 | 3 episodes | 139–174 min | |
| Welcome to Earth | Nature | December 8, 2021 | | 1 season, 6 episodes | 36–44 min | |
| Sketchbook | Animation | April 27, 2022 | | 1 season, 6 episodes | 22–23 min | |
| America the Beautiful | Nature | July 4, 2022 | | 1 season, 6 episodes | 46–49 min | |
| Light & Magic | Filmmaking | July 27, 2022 | April 18, 2025 | 2 seasons, 9 episodes | 54–63 min | |
| Epic Adventures with Bertie Gregory | Nature | September 8, 2022 | | 1 season, 5 episodes | 40–48 min | |
| Growing Up | Adolescence | September 8, 2022 | | 1 season, 10 episodes | 23–29 min | |
| Super/Natural | Nature | September 21, 2022 | | 1 season, 6 episodes | 42–48 min | |
| Shipwreck Hunters Australia | Exploration | October 5, 2022 | August 27, 2025 | 2 seasons, 12 episodes | 42–53 min | |
| Save Our Squad with David Beckham | Sports | November 9, 2022 | | 4 episodes | 43–47 min | |
| Limitless with Chris Hemsworth | Nature | November 16, 2022 | August 15, 2025 | 2 seasons, 9 episodes | 41–75 min | |
| Chasing Waves | Sports | January 11, 2023 | | 1 season, 8 episodes | 35–50 min | |
| MPower | Comic book industry/Filmmaking | March 8, 2023 | | 4 episodes | 36–41 min | |
| Rennervations | Renovation/Docu-reality | April 12, 2023 | May 3, 2023 | 1 season, 4 episodes | 48–51 min | |
| Matildas: The World at Our Feet | Sports | April 26, 2023 | | 6 episodes | 40–42 min | |
| Ed Sheeran: The Sum of It All | Music biography | May 3, 2023 | | 4 episodes | 31–34 min | |
| Animals Up Close with Bertie Gregory | Nature | September 13, 2023 | | 1 season, 6 episodes | 38–44 min | |
| A Real Bug's Life | Nature | January 24, 2024 | January 15, 2025 | 2 seasons, 10 episodes | 27–32 min | |
| Choir | Music | January 31, 2024 | | 1 season, 6 episodes | 43–48 min | |
| Harlem Ice | Sports | February 12, 2025 | | 1 season, 5 episodes | 30–36 min | |

==== Reality ====
| Title | Genre | Premiere | Finale | Seasons | Runtime | Notes |
|---|---|---|---|---|---|---|
| Encore! | Reality | November 12, 2019 | January 24, 2020 | 1 season, 12 episodes | 52–59 min | |
| Shop Class | Reality competition | February 28, 2020 | April 17, 2020 | 1 season, 8 episodes | 41–45 min | |
| Be Our Chef | Cooking competition | March 27, 2020 | June 5, 2020 | 1 season, 11 episodes | 24–28 min | |
| Foodtastic | Cooking competition | December 15, 2021 | | 1 season, 11 episodes | 42–45 min | |
| The Quest | Fantasy/Reality competition | May 11, 2022 | | 1 season, 8 episodes | 40–47 min | |
| Family Reboot | Reality | June 15, 2022 | | 1 season, 6 episodes | 24–25 min | |

==== Variety ====
| Title | Genre | Premiere | Finale | Seasons | Runtime | Notes |
|---|---|---|---|---|---|---|
| The Big Fib | Game show | May 22, 2020 | October 23, 2020 | 1 season, 30 episodes | 23–26 min | |
| Muppets Now | Variety/puppetry | July 31, 2020 | September 4, 2020 | 1 season, 6 episodes | 27–30 min | |
| Earth to Ned | Talk show/puppetry | September 4, 2020 | January 1, 2021 | 1 season, 20 episodes | 24–28 min | |
| Earth Moods | Short-form visual | April 16, 2021 | | 1 season, 5 episodes | 31 min | |
| Turning the Tables with Robin Roberts | Talk show | July 28, 2021 | March 15, 2023 | 2 seasons, 8 episodes | 26–29 min | |
| Donna Hay Christmas | Cooking show | November 2, 2022 | | 1 season, 4 episodes | 24–39 min | |
| Donna Hay Coastal Celebrations | Cooking show | April 1, 2026 | | 4 episodes | 45–48 min | |

=== Shorts ===
These are shows where the majority of the episodes has a runtime of less than 20 minutes.

| Title | Genre | Premiere | Finale | Seasons | Runtime | Notes |
|---|---|---|---|---|---|---|
| Disney Family Sundays | DIY | November 12, 2019 | August 7, 2020 | 1 season, 40 episodes | 6–11 min | |
| Forky Asks a Question | Animation | November 12, 2019 | January 10, 2020 | 1 season, 10 episodes | 6–8 min | |
| Pixar in Real Life | Hidden camera reality | November 12, 2019 | September 4, 2020 | 1 season, 11 episodes | 5–7 min | |
| SparkShorts | Animation anthology | November 12, 2019 | February 2, 2024 | 1 season, 11 episodes | 6–13 min | |
| One Day at Disney Shorts | Docuseries | December 6, 2019 | November 20, 2020 | 1 season, 51 episodes | 5–10 min | |
| Disney Insider | Docuseries | March 20, 2020 | December 15, 2021 | 1 season, 14 episodes | 16–23 min | |
| Zenimation | Animation/ASMR | May 22, 2020 | June 11, 2021 | 2 seasons, 20 episodes | 5–50 min (Note: These shows have episodes which are longform collections of previous episodes.) | |
| Inside Pixar | Docuseries | November 13, 2020 | May 21, 2021 | 1 season, 20 episodes | 10–16 min | |
| The Wonderful World of Mickey Mouse | Animation | November 18, 2020 | August 25, 2021 | 1 season, 20 episodes | 9 min | |
| Marvel Studios: Legends | Superhero clip show | January 8, 2021 | December 15, 2023 | 2 seasons, 47 episodes | 5–12 min | |
| Pixar Popcorn | Animation | January 22, 2021 | | 1 season, 11 episodes | 2–24 min | |
| Star Wars Vehicle Flythroughs | Anthology series | May 4, 2021 | | 1 season, 2 episodes | 4–5 min | |
| How to Stay at Home | Animated short | August 11, 2021 | | 1 season, 4 episodes | 3–6 min | |
| Dug Days | Animated comedy | September 1, 2021 | | 1 season, 5 episodes | 10–13 min | |
| Star Wars: Visions | Animated space opera anthology | September 22, 2021 | October 29, 2025 | 3 seasons, 27 episodes | 14–24 min | |
| Star Wars: Galaxy of Sounds | Anthology series | September 29, 2021 | | 1 season, 7 episodes | 7–9 min | |
| Olaf Presents | Animated comedy | November 12, 2021 | | 1 season, 6 episodes | 5–12 min | |
| Ice Age: Scrat Tales | Animated comedy | April 13, 2022 | | 1 season, 6 episodes | 4–5 min | |
| Baymax! | Animated comedy | June 29, 2022 | | 1 season, 6 episodes | 11–12 min | |
| I Am Groot | Animated comedy-action | August 10, 2022 | September 6, 2023 | 2 seasons, 10 episodes | 4–6 min | |
| Cars on the Road | Animated comedy | September 8, 2022 | | 1 season, 9 episodes | 10–14 min | |
| Star Wars Tales | Animated space opera anthology | October 26, 2022 | May 4, 2025 | 3 seasons, 18 episodes | 13–19 min | |
| Zootopia+ | Animated comedy anthology | November 9, 2022 | | 1 season, 6 episodes | 10–12 min | |
| Kizazi Moto: Generation Fire | Animated science fiction anthology | July 5, 2023 | | 1 season, 10 episodes | 15–17 min | |
| People & Places | Culture docuseries anthology | February 9, 2024 | July 9, 2025 | 1 season, 5 episodes | 9–32 min | |
| Lego Pixar: BrickToons | Animated anthology | September 4, 2024 | | 1 season, 5 episodes | 9–10 min | |

=== Continuations ===
| Title | Genre | Prev. network(s) | Premiere | Finale | Seasons | Runtime | Notes |
|---|---|---|---|---|---|---|---|
| Disney's Fairy Tale Weddings (season 2) | Wedding docuseries | Freeform | February 14, 2020 | April 3, 2020 | 1 season, 8 episodes | 36–41 min | |
| Star Wars: The Clone Wars (season 7) | Animated space opera | Cartoon Network (seasons 1–5); Netflix (season 6) | February 21, 2020 | May 4, 2020 | 1 season, 12 episodes | 22–31 min | |
| Weird but True! (season 3) | Educational children's docuseries | Nat Geo Kids | August 14, 2020 | November 6, 2020 | 1 season, 13 episodes | 23–26 min | |

=== Specials ===
These are supplementary content related to original TV series or films.

==== One-time ====
| Title | Genre | Premiere | Runtime | Notes |
|---|---|---|---|---|
| One Day at Disney | Documentary | December 3, 2019 | 1 h 1 min | |
| High School Musical: The Musical: The Series: The Special | Musical/Making-of | December 14, 2019 | 23 min | |
| The Lego Star Wars Holiday Special | Animation | November 17, 2020 | 49 min | |
| The Real Right Stuff | Documentary | November 20, 2020 | 1 h 30 min | |
| High School Musical: The Musical: The Holiday Special | Musical | December 11, 2020 | 47 min | |
| A Spark Story | Making-of documentary | September 24, 2021 | 1 h 28 min | |
| Lego Star Wars: Terrifying Tales | Animation | October 1, 2021 | 48 min | |
| Under the Helmet: The Legacy of Boba Fett | Documentary | November 12, 2021 | 22 min | |
| The Wonderful Winter of Mickey Mouse | Animation | February 18, 2022 | 24 min | |
| The Wonderful Spring of Mickey Mouse | Animation | March 25, 2022 | 23 min | |
| Disney Gallery: The Book of Boba Fett | Making-of documentary | May 4, 2022 | 1 h 3 min | |
| The Wonderful Summer of Mickey Mouse | Animation | July 8, 2022 | 23 min | |
| Lego Star Wars: Summer Vacation | Animation | August 5, 2022 | 49 min | |
| Andor: A Disney+ Day Special Look | Making-of documentary | September 8, 2022 | 10 min | |
| Obi-Wan Kenobi: A Jedi's Return | Making-of documentary | September 8, 2022 | 1 h | |
| The Wonderful Autumn of Mickey Mouse | Animation | November 18, 2022 | 24 min | |
| Willow: Behind the Magic | Making-of documentary | January 25, 2023 | 34 min | |
| The Wonderful World of Mickey Mouse: Steamboat Silly | Animation | July 28, 2023 | 9 min | |
| Lego Marvel Avengers: Code Red | Animation | October 27, 2023 | 46 min | |
| A Hero's Journey: The Making of Percy Jackson and the Olympians | Making-of documentary | January 30, 2024 | 50 min | |
| Iwájú: A Day Ahead | Making-of documentary | February 28, 2024 | 1 h 11 min | |
| Lego Marvel Avengers: Mission Demolition | Animation | October 18, 2024 | 44 min | |
| Star Wars: Skeleton Crew: A Special Look | Making-of documentary | November 29, 2024 | 3 min | |
| Meet the Pickles: The Making of Win or Lose | Making-of documentary | March 12, 2025 | 29 min | |
| Andor Season 1 Recap | Clip show | April 8, 2025 | 15 min | |
| Soy Luna: Season 1, 2 & 3 Recap | Clip show | June 29, 2026 | 10 min | |

==== Episodic ====
| Title | Genre | Premiere | Finale | Seasons | Runtime | Notes |
|---|---|---|---|---|---|---|
| High School Musical: The Musical: The Series: Sing-Along | Musical | January 19, 2020 | | 1 season, 10 episodes | 32–40 min | |
| Disney Gallery: The Mandalorian | Making-of docuseries | May 4, 2020 | June 28, 2023 | 3 seasons, 11 episodes | 19–69 min | |
| Into the Unknown: Making Frozen II | Making-of docuseries | June 26, 2020 | | 1 season, 6 episodes | 31–45 min | |
| Marvel Studios: Assembled | Making-of docuseries | March 12, 2021 | November 13, 2024 | 2 seasons, 23 episodes | 42–67 min | |
| Voices Rising: The Music of Wakanda Forever | Music docuseries | February 28, 2023 | | 3 episodes | 22–33 min | |
| Fire and Water: Making the Avatar Films | Making of | November 7, 2025 | | 2 episodes | 34–49 min | |

=== Non-English language ===
==== Drama ====
| Title | Genre | Premiere | Finale | Seasons | Runtime | Language | Notes |
|---|---|---|---|---|---|---|---|
| Parallels | Science fiction fantasy mystery | March 23, 2022 | | 1 season, 6 episodes | 34–43 min | French | |
| It Was Always Me | Musical/Mystery drama | July 20, 2022 | January 17, 2024 | 2 seasons, 18 episodes | 38–55 min | Spanish | (Note: These shows have been released earlier in selected markets. This is the US release date.) |
| Tierra Incognita | Mystery/Horror | September 8, 2022 | December 13, 2023 | 2 seasons, 16 episodes | 30–44 min | Spanish | |
| The Chorus: Success, Here I Go | Musical drama | February 1, 2023 | | 1 season, 10 episodes | 37–45 min | Portuguese | |
| Journey to the Center of the Earth | Adventure drama | April 5, 2023 | | 8 episodes | 20–37 min | Spanish | |
| FreeKs | Musical/Mystery drama | June 28, 2023 | | 1 season, 13 episodes | 25–46 min | Spanish | |
| The Three Detectives | Teen drama/Crime procedural | November 1, 2023 | | 1 season, 10 episodes | 34–41 min | German | |
| Aruna's Magic | Fantasy drama | November 29, 2023 | | 1 season, 6 episodes | 29–48 min | Portuguese | |
| The Secret Score | Fantasy/Mystery | April 17, 2024 | | 1 season, 8 episodes | 30–37 min | Spanish | |
| Ayla & the Mirrors | Coming of age musical | September 27, 2024 | November 1, 2024 | 1 season, 30 episodes | 29–41 min | Spanish | |
| Wonderboys: The Secret Treasure of Naples | Adventure | December 6, 2024 | | 1 season, 6 episodes | 40–45 min | Italian | |
| Invisible | Drama/Mystery | December 13, 2024 | | 6 episodes | 42–60 min | Spanish | |
| 20,000 Leagues Under the Sea | Adventure drama | July 23, 2025 | | 6 episodes | 19-23 min | Spanish | |
| Playback: Together We Are One | Musical teen drama | October 29, 2025 | | 1 season, 20 episodes | 20–31 min | Spanish | |

==== Comedy ====
| Title | Genre | Premiere | Finale | Seasons | Runtime | Language | Notes |
|---|---|---|---|---|---|---|---|
| Intertwined | Musical/Fantasy comedy drama | November 12, 2021 | May 24, 2023 | 2 seasons, 17 episodes | 37–53 min | Spanish | |
| Weekend Family | Comedy | March 9, 2022 | April 5, 2023 | 2 seasons, 16 episodes | 25–37 min | French | |
| All the Same... or Not | Comedy drama | July 20, 2022 | September 27, 2023 | 2 seasons, 18 episodes | 34–45 min | Portuguese | |
| Sumo Do, Sumo Don't | Sports comedy drama | October 26, 2022 | December 21, 2022 | 1 season, 10 episodes | 43–56 min | Japanese | |
| @Gina Yei:#WithAllMyHeartAndMore | Musical comedy drama | January 11, 2023 | | 1 season, 12 episodes | 38–51 min | Spanish | (Note: Moved to FlixLatino for season 2.) |
| Mila in the Multiverse | Science fiction comedy drama | February 15, 2023 | | 1 season, 8 episodes | 22–32 min | Portuguese | (Note: Moved to Disney Channel Brazil for season 2.) |
| The Low Tone Club | Musical comedy drama | February 22, 2023 | | 1 season, 10 episodes | 28–36 min | Spanish | |
| It's All Right! | Musical romantic comedy | April 12, 2023 | | 4 episodes | 28–36 min | Portuguese | |
| C.H.U.E.C.O | Sitcom | July 14, 2023 | May 15, 2024 | 2 seasons, 25 episodes | 18–34 min | Spanish | |
| L-POP | Musical comedy drama | September 27, 2023 | | 1 season, 6 episodes | 29–43 min | Spanish | |

==== Unscripted ====
| Title | Genre | Premiere | Finale | Seasons | Runtime | Language | Notes |
|---|---|---|---|---|---|---|---|
| BTS Monuments: Beyond the Star | Music docuseries | December 20, 2023 | January 10, 2024 | 1 season, 8 episodes | 31–34 min | Korean | |
| Seventeen: Our Chapter | Music docuseries | November 7, 2025 | November 28, 2025 | 4 episodes | 48 min | Korean | |

==== Specials ====
| Title | Genre | Premiere | Runtime | Language | Notes |
|---|---|---|---|---|---|
| An Extra Episode, or Not: Behind the Scenes of All the Same | Making-of documentary | July 29, 2022 | 29 min | Portuguese | |
| It Was Always Me: Behind the Story | Making-of documentary | September 2, 2022 | 31 min | Spanish | |
| Weekend Family Christmas Special | Comedy | December 9, 2022 | 46 min | French | |
| Intertwined Live! | Musical fantasy comedy drama | May 5, 2023 | 1 h 8 min | Spanish | |
| C.H.U.E.C.O's Christmas | Sitcom | December 15, 2023 | 18 min | Spanish | |

=== Regional original programming ===
| Title | Genre | Premiere | Finale | Seasons | Runtime | Exclusive region(s) | Language | Notes |
|---|---|---|---|---|---|---|---|---|
| Fearless: The Inside Story of the AFLW | Sports docuseries | August 24, 2022 | | 6 episodes | 45–52 min | All markets except Latin America and United States | English | (Note: Released as a Hulu Original in the United States and as a Star+ Original in Latin America.) |
| The Montaners | Docu-reality | November 9, 2022 | December 4, 2024 | 2 seasons, 16 episodes | 40–62 min | Latin America | Spanish | (Note: Season 1 was previously available in the United States, but was later removed from the service.) |
| Daddies on Request | Musical comedy drama | November 23, 2022 | November 8, 2023 | 2 seasons, 17 episodes | 28–40 min | Select territories | Spanish | (Note: This series was previously available globally, but was later removed from the service in select territories.) |
| Marvel Lucha Libre Edition: The Origin of the Mask | Sports mockumentary | January 18, 2023 | | 1 season, 5 episodes | 15–20 min | Latin America | Spanish | |
| 4EVER | Musical drama | October 11, 2023 | | 5 episodes | 37–43 min | Select territories | Spanish | |
| Isabel Preysler: My Christmas | Docu-reality | December 5, 2023 | | 2 episodes | 39 min | Latin and North America | Spanish | (Note: Released as a Star Original in select other territories.) |

==== Co-productions ====
| Title | Genre | Partner/Region | Premiere | Finale | Seasons | Runtime | Exclusive region(s) | Language | Notes |
|---|---|---|---|---|---|---|---|---|---|
| In the Soop: Friendcation | Reality | JTBC/South Korea | October 19, 2022 | | 4 episodes | 53–62 min | Selected territories | Korean | (Note: Released as a Disney+ Hotstar Original in Southeast Asia and India.) |
| Doctor Who (series 14–15) | Science fiction adventure drama | BBC One/United Kingdom | May 10, 2024 | May 31, 2025 | 2 seasons, 16 episodes | 45–57 min | All markets except Ireland and United Kingdom | English | |

==== Specials ====
| Title | Genre | Premiere | Runtime | Exclusive region(s) | Language | Notes |
|---|---|---|---|---|---|---|
| Dancing with the Stars: The Pros' Most Memorable Dances | Retrospective special | September 8, 2022 | 56 min | North America | English | |
| Doctor Who: The Star Beast | Science fiction adventure drama | November 25, 2023 | 58 min | All territories except Ireland and United Kingdom | English | |
| Doctor Who: Wild Blue Yonder | Science fiction adventure drama | December 2, 2023 | 55 min | All territories except Ireland and United Kingdom | English | |
| Doctor Who:The Giggle | Science fiction adventure drama | December 9, 2023 | 62 min | All territories except Ireland and United Kingdom | English | |
| Doctor Who: The Church on Ruby Road | Science fiction adventure drama | December 25, 2023 | 56 min | All territories except Ireland and United Kingdom | English | |
| Doctor Who: Joy to the World | Science fiction adventure drama | December 25, 2024 | 57 min | All territories except Ireland and United Kingdom | English | |

=== Exclusive programming ===
These television series and specials premiered exclusively on the service without the Disney+ Original label. Availability may vary across regions.

| Title | Genre | Premiere | Finale | Seasons | Runtime | Exclusive region(s) | Language | Notes |
|---|---|---|---|---|---|---|---|---|
| Fortnite x The Simpsons | Animation | November 1, 2025 | November 24, 2025 | 4 episodes | 4−7 min | All markets | English | |
| Taylor Swift: The End of an Era | Music docuseries | December 12, 2025 | December 23, 2025 | 6 episodes | 43–50 min | All markets | English | |

==== Specials ====
| Title | Genre | Premiere | Runtime | Exclusive region(s) | Language | Notes |
|---|---|---|---|---|---|---|
| Maggie Simpson in "The Force Awakens from Its Nap" | Animated short | May 4, 2021 | 3 min | All markets | English | |
| The Simpsons: The Good, the Bart, and the Loki | Animated short | July 7, 2021 | 6 min | All markets | English | |
| The Simpsons in Plusaversary | Animated short | November 12, 2021 | 4 min | All markets | English | |
| The Simpsons: When Billie Met Lisa | Animated short | April 22, 2022 | 3 min | All markets | English | |
| The Simpsons: Welcome to the Club | Animated short | September 8, 2022 | 5 min | All markets | English | |
| The Simpsons Meet the Bocellis in "Feliz Navidad" | Animated short | December 15, 2022 | 4 min | All markets | English | |
| Maggie Simpson in "Rogue Not Quite One" | Animated short | May 4, 2023 | 4 min | All markets | English | |
| The Simpsons: May the 12th Be With You | Animated short | May 10, 2024 | 4 min | All markets | English | |
| The Simpsons: The Most Wonderful Time of the Year | Animated short | October 11, 2024 | 3 min | All markets | English | |
| The Simpsons: O C'mon All Ye Faithful | Adult animation | December 17, 2024 | 45 min | All markets | English | |
| The Simpsons: The Past and the Furious | Adult animation | February 12, 2025 | 24 min | All markets | English | |
| The Simpsons: Yellow Planet | Adult animation | April 22, 2025 | 24 min | All markets | English | |
| The Beatles Anthology: Episode Nine | Music docuseries | November 28, 2025 | 51 min | All markets | English | |
| The Simpsons: Extreme Makeover: Homer Edition | Adult animation | June 17, 2026 | 48 min | All markets | English | |
| The Simpsons: Yellow Mirror | Adult animation | August 26, 2026 | 26 min | All markets | English | |

=== Exclusive international distribution ===
| Title | Genre | Original network/Region | Premiere date | Seasons | Runtime | Exclusive region(s) | Language | Notes |
|---|---|---|---|---|---|---|---|---|
| Snowdrop | Romantic dark comedy | JTBC/South Korea | February 9, 2022 | 16 episodes | 74–100 min | United States | Korean | (Note: Released as a Hulu Original (formerly Star Original in other territories and Star+ Original in Latin America) outside United States.) |
| The Hardy Boys | Mystery teen drama | Hulu/United States; YTV/Canada | April 6, 2022 | 3 seasons, 31 episodes | 40–46 min | Latin America | English | (Note: Released as a Hulu Original outside Latin America (include territories outside United States, which formelly labeled as Star Original).) |
| Club Mickey Mouse Malaysia (season 4) | Variety | Disney+ Hotstar/Malaysia | June 1, 2022 | 1 season, 13 episodes | 24–26 min | Selected territories | English | |
| Delicacies Destiny | Period romantic comedy | Bilibili/China | June 8, 2022 | 17 episodes | 27–51 min | Selected territories | Mandarin | |
| Soundtrack#1 | Musical/Romantic drama | Star/South Korea | October 21, 2022 | 4 episodes | 40–55 min | United States | Korean | |
| Super Junior: The Last Man Standing | Music docuseries | Star/South Korea | January 18, 2023 | 2 episodes | 50–51 min | Latin America | Korean | |
| Soundtrack#2 | Musical/Romantic drama | Star/South Korea | December 6, 2023 | 6 episodes | 41–51 min | United States | Korean | |

== See also ==
- List of Star (Disney+) original programming
- List of Disney+ Hotstar original programming#Disney+ Originals
- List of Hulu original programming
  - List of ended Hulu original programming
  - List of Hulu exclusive international distribution programming
