= Kids' Choice Awards Argentina 2011 =

Nickelodeon's 1st Annual Kids' Choice Awards Argentina
- Date: 11 October 2011
- Location: Microestadio Malvinas Argentinas, Buenos Aires
- Hosted by: Nicolás Vázquez

Television/radio coverage
- Network: Nickelodeon Latin America
- Runtime: 90 minutes
- Produced by: Production company: Nickelodeon Productions; Executive producer: Paula Guerro Tatiana Rodriguez

The Nickelodeon Kids Choice Awards Argentina 2011 took place on 11 October 2011 at 20:00 hrs (Argentine Time) in the Microestadio Malvinas Argentinas in the city of Buenos Aires. Nicolás Vázquez was presented as host. The nominees were presented on 22 August 2011 for 14 categories. Pro-social Award was presented to the Foundation of Southern Ideas Marcelo Tinelli and the lifetime achievement award was given to Cris Morena. The musical performances during the awards were telecasts Teen Angels. that carry out the single "Que Llegue tu Voz" and "Mirame, Mirate" from their album TeenAngels 5. Dulce Maria, Tan Bionica and Sueña conmigo of performances during the telecast of the event, and each sang a medley of some of his latest hits. As in previous years, voting was conducted online through the official website of the program. In addition, the network of Facebook page also can vote through Facebook accounts 'fans' first channel.

== Background ==
The editing in Argentina was confirmed in early 2011. Original event earlier this year, but Nickelodeon then confirmed that the show take place after the 2011 Kids Choice Awards Mexico. In August 2011 it was confirmed that the presenter would be Nicolás Vázquez.

== Hosts ==
- Nicolás Vázquez

== Announcer ==
- Roger (fictional character Nickelodeon)

== Performers ==
- The cast of Sueña conmigo ("Sueña Conmigo")
- Dulce María ("Ya No")
- Tan Bionica ("Ella")
- Teen Angels ("Que Llegue tu Voz" and "Mirame, Mirate")

== Presenters ==
- Agustín Almeyda
- Roger González
- María del Cerro
- Guido Kaczka
- Valeria Baroni
- Gabo Ramos
- Benjamín Amadeo
- Vanessa Leiro
- Brenda Asnicar
- Franco Massini
- Juan Ciancio
- MR
- Valeria Gastaldi
- Evaluna Montaner
- Eiza González
- Guido Penneli
- Favio Posca
- Lucia Precul
- Santiago Ramundo
- Griselda Siciliani
- María Eugenia Suárez
- Gastón Vietto
- Pablo Martínez
- Candela Vetrano
- Matías Martin

== Categories ==
=== Newcomer on TV ===
Artist	TV Series	Result	Country
Jazmín/María Eugenia Suárez	Casi Ángeles	Nominated	Argentina
Peter/Juan Ciancio	Peter Punk	Nominated	Argentina
Grachi/Isabella Castillo	Grachi	Nominated	Cuba
Clara/Eiza González	Sueña conmigo	Won	Mexico

=== Favourite Actor ===
Actor	TV Series	Result	Country
Nicolás Riera	Casi Ángeles	Nominated	Argentina
Nicolás Cabré	Los únicos	Nominated	Argentina
Roger González	Highway: Rodando la Aventura	Nominated	Mexico
Santiago Ramundo	Sueña conmigo	Won	Argentina

=== Favourite Actress ===
Actress	TV Series	Result	Country
María Eugenia Suárez	Casi Ángeles	Won	Argentina
Brenda Asnicar	Sueña conmigo	Nominated	Argentina
Valeria Baroni	Highway: Rodando la Aventura	Nominated	Argentina
Eiza González	Sueña conmigo	Nominated	Mexico

=== Athlete of the Year ===
Athlete	Result	Country
Luciana Aymar	Nominated	Argentina
Diego Forlán	Nominated	Uruguay
Martín Palermo	Nominated	Argentina
Lionel Messi	Won	Argentina

=== Favourite Latin Singer or Band ===
Singer or Band	Result	Country
Teen Angels	Won	Argentina
Agustín Almeyda	Nominated	Argentina
Anahí	Nominated	Mexico
Shakira	Nominated	Colombia

=== Favourite International Singer ===
Singer	Result	Country
Justin Bieber	Nominated	Canada
Miley Cyrus	Nominated	USA
Big Time Rush	Nominated	USA
Selena Gomez	Won	USA

=== Favourite Song ===
Song	Artist	Result	Country
Boyfriend	Big Time Rush	Won	USA
Baby	Justin Bieber	Nominated	Canada
Loca	Shakira	Nominated	Colombia
The Time (Dirty Bit)	The Black Eyed Peas	Nominated	USA

=== Favourite Animated Show ===
Show	Result	Country	Network
SpongeBob SquarePants (Bob Esponja)	Nominated	USA	Nickelodeon Latin America
Phineas and Ferb	Won	USA	Disney Channel Latin America, Disney XD Latin America
The Simpsons (Los Simpson)	Nominated	USA	FOX Latin America
El Chavo	Nominated	Mexico	Cartoon Network Latin America

=== Favourite Villain ===
Villain	Series	Result	Country
Teo/Benjamín Amadeo	Casi Ángeles	Nominated	Argentina
Ronco/Favio Posca	Los únicos	Won	Argentina
Maltilda/Kimberly Dos Ramos	Grachi	Nominated	Venezuela
Marcia/Vanesa Gabriela Leiro	Sueña conmigo	Nominated	Argentina

=== Favourite Latin TV Show ===
Show	Result	Country	Network
Casi Ángeles	Nominated	Argentina	Telefe
Los únicos	Nominated	Argentina	El Trece
Grachi	Nominated	USA	Nickelodeon Latin America
Sueña conmigo	Won	Argentina	Nickelodeon Latin America

=== Favourite International TV Show ===
Show	Result	Country	Network
House of Anubis (El Misterio de Anubis)	Nominated	UK	Nickelodeon Latin America
iCarly	Won	USA	Nickelodeon Latin America
Big Time Rush	Nominated	USA	Nickelodeon Latin America
Wizards of Waverly Place (Los Hechiceros de Waverly Place)	Nominated	USA	Disney Channel Latin America

=== Favourite Animated Film ===
Film	Result	Country
Rio	Nominated	Brazil; USA
Toy Story 3	Nominated	USA
Shrek Forever After (Shrek: Felices Para Siempre)	Nominated	USA
Tangled (Enredados)	Won	USA

=== Favourite Video Game ===
Video game	Result
Pro Evolution Soccer 2011	Nominated
Kinect Adventures!	Nominated
Just Dance 2	Won
Angry Birds	Nominated
