= Highway: Rodando la Aventura =

- Genre: Comedy
- Starring: Roger Gonzalez; Valeria Baroni; Walter Bruno; Miguel Gonzalez; Maria Clara Alonso; Daniel Martins; Paulina Holguin; Vanessa Andreu
- Opening theme: "Highway" by Highway Rodando La Aventura
- Country of origin: Argentina
- Original language: Spanish
- No. of seasons: 1
- No. of episodes: 12

Production
- Executive producer: Laura Couto
- Production locations: Buenos Aires, Argentina
- Running time: 12/25 minutes (approx.)
- Production company: The Walt Disney Company Argentina

Original release
- Network: Disney Channel
- Release: October 26 – December 2, 2010

Highway: Rodando la Aventura is a series of Disney Channel Latin America. It is the fourth original production of Disney Channel Latin America, after Zapping Zone, Disney Planet and Art Attack, Disney and the second original mini-series, after Disney Planet. It stars the presenters of Zapping Zone.

The leading couple in this series is the star of Disney Channel, Roger Gonzalez and Valeria Baroni who left the reality High School Musical: La selección.

== Synopsis ==
Highway: Rodando la Aventura tells the story of a group of eight friends who travel in a motorhome around Latin America to attend the return concert of "WhiteHats", their favorite band, but on the way they form their own band.

== Release ==
Paulina Holguin confirmed via Facebook that September 5, 2010 would be the launch of the trailer for the series before and after the premiere of Camp Rock 2: The Final Jam.

Its premiere was on 26 October 2010.

== Characters ==
=== Starring ===
- Roger González - Roger: He's the heartthrob of the guys, he can play guitar very well, he realizes he feels love for Vale.
- Valeria Baroni - Vale: She's the nicest of the group and has a very good voice next to Pau, and falls for Roger.
- Walter Bruno - Walter: All the guys ask for favors which can not say no and have a great voice. He is in love with Pau.
- Miguel González - Migue: He is an actor and is always practicing monologues and, sometimes only makes drama.
- María Clara Alonso - Clari: She's neat for all the guys, but during the trip to realize that within it there is only a girl of good manners.
- Dani Martins - Dani: He is constantly devouring the food of the guys, and is the athlete of the group. Gosta de Pau
- Paulina Holguín - Pau: She is the organic group, who cares about animals. Walter likes and a little Danny.
- Vanessa Andreu - Vane: She is the diva actress, thinks she's a Hollywood actress, who sometimes seems bad but, in reality, is a funny girl.

=== Guest characters ===
- Esteban Prol - Richard: Valeria's father. he is smart, funny, strict, and he adores his daughter, likes sarcasm, is a man with a word most of the time. Attracted to Mona.
- Santiago Stieben - Various: Called the joker who will go through several characters which the guys asked, "What was not you who ...?" and he will always answer "No".
- Jorge Blanco - Diego: He is the backpacker and a friend of Vale. Roger and Walter were jealous because he captures the attention of girls.

== Episodes ==
No. overall	No. in season	Title	Original release date	Prod. code
1	1	"ROCK-A-PALLUZA"	October 26, 2010	101
The episode begins when all are taking advantage of their free time, when Clari shouts and announces that I ruined the logo of the White Hats since I was doing a stamp with your logo. Then Richard arrives and questions if can already start, and Vale replied that no, lack of Dani and Richard says that it will search and will bethen Dani comes and Pau gives you a salad, then Vale says that he will go to find his dad, she falls, just after the Pope arrives and Roger says that he will go to look for voucher, then Vale reaches and Clari says that he will go to find Roger, then Roger comes to ensuring that there is a girl igualita a Clari and Migue you answer: "" it's Clari"", when Pau says that he will go to look for Clari, after, Walter stops her telling him not to go, just after Clari reach and everyone was already ready when the Richard discovers that they are not the keys to the trailer, when everybody starts to look, Migue assure that Dani ate the keys, since they could drop to the salad that gave Pau, but in the end they discover that Roger used as a pua for guitar, all happy pulled out saying they were going to pick up Vane. Special guest: Esteban Prol as Richard; Guest Star: Santiago Stieben as presenter of TV; Away: Vanessa Andreu as Vane Closing theme: "Highway"
2	2	"El Rey de las Bromas"	October 28, 2010	102
The kids are with a "King of jokes" playing jokes all. Vale is very sad by her ex-boyfriend "ChuChu", which puts Roger very jealous. Clari and Pau investigate the King of jokes and think who would be suspects, Clari offers Vane as suspicious, since she is very jealous of Vane; While Vale and Roger try to compose a song, sounds cell phone from Vale, Roger stops it by accident, Clara and Pau think that Roger is the "King of jokes", but when unfortunate way discover that the King is Walter, Walter apologizes, gets his punishment, but at the end you spend your joke to Clari, Richard offers them all dinner with the at some restaurant and also gives his punishment to Walter which is cleaning the Motorhome and not dining out with Richard and others. Migue then gives him a sandwich, when you eat it discovers that had a card of the "King of jokes" inside and at the end "ChuChu" called by phone to Vale and she sits to talk with, it talk lasts long, and she ensures that you short with the mention much, just after Roger asks him if he wants to sing a song. Walter jokes: Dani: he took his lucky t-shirt/t-shirt, they put a patch that says"The King of jokes"and hid in a bongo k. (Before Opening); Vale: you sending a ChuCho message saying "this is a message from the King of jokes". (Before Opening); Roger: put a cake in the Chair that is sentaria, and the cake had a card of the King's jokes. (Before Opening); Miguel: made you a few cuts to his new pants and everyone responds that he was"The King of jokes". (Before Opening); Paulina: when I went for a granola to Clari who were on a shelf are you Cay everything you had on that shelf. (When she and Clari sought suspects); Clari: when you open the window (by Walter desire) falls with confetti falling to her. (When securing to Walter to chair); Special guest: Esteban Prol as Richard; Guest Star: Santiago Stieben as alfajores seller Away: Vanessa Andreu as Vane; Closing theme: 911
3	3	TBA	November 2, 2010	103
4	4	TBA	2010	104
5	5	TBA	2010	105
6	6	TBA	2010	106
7	7	TBA	2010	107
8	8	TBA	2010	108
9	9	TBA	2010	109
10	10	TBA	2010	110
11	11	TBA	2010	111
12	12	TBA	2010	112

== Soundtrack ==
No	Year	Title	Singer(s)
1	2010	Highway	Paulina Holguín, Valeria Baroni, María Clara Alonso, Vanessa Andreu, Roger González, Walter Bruno, Miguel González y Daniel Rodrigo Martins
2	2010	Amigas Por Siempre	Paulina Holguín, Valeria Baroni, María Clara Alonso, Vanessa Andreu
3	2010	Estrella de Rock	Walter Bruno
4	2010	Nuestro Amor	Roger González y Valeria Baroni
5	2010	911	Valeria Baroni
6	2010	Secretos	María Clara Alonso
7	2010	Caer en tu red	Daniel Rodrigo Martins
8	2010	Cielo	Paulina Holguín
9	2010	Un Manual	Roger Gonzalez
10	2010	Puede Ser	Roger González, Daniel Rodrigo Martins y Walter Bruno
11	2010	Blablabla	Paulina Holguín, Valeria Baroni, María Clara Alonso, Vanessa Andreu, Roger González, Walter Bruno, Miguel González y Daniel Rodrigo Martins
12	2010	La Voz	Paulina Holguín, Valeria Baroni, María Clara Alonso, Vanessa Andreu, Roger González, Walter Bruno, Miguel González y Daniel Rodrigo Martins

== Tours ==
Date	Location	Place
October 28, 2010	Colombia Bogotá	Parque Simon Bolivar
November 4, 2010	Chile Santiago de Chile	Estadio Monumental David Arellano
November 8, 2010	Argentina Córdoba	
November 9, 2010	Argentina Rosario	
November 13, 2010	Argentina Buenos Aires	River Plate Stadium
February 4, 2011	Argentina Buenos Aires	GEBA

== Curiosities ==
- The song "La Voz" is a song of the miniseries, but then became the official song of Friends for Change 2011.
