= Vanessa Andreu =

Mexican actress and singer

- Born: Vanessa Andreu Ibarra; July 18, 1979 (age 46); Mexico
- Other names: Vane
- Occupations: Actress, singer, hostess, reporter
- Years active: 2005-present
- Musical career
- Genres: Pop
- Instrument: Vocals

Vanessa Andreu (born Vanessa Andreu Ibarra on July 18, 1979) is a Mexican actress, singer, hostess and reporter. Best known for a hostess and reporter of Zapping Zone for Disney Channel and Disney Planet.

== Filmography ==
Television
Year	Title	Role	Notes
2005-12	Zapping Zone	Herself/hostess	TV show
2007-11	Celebratón	Herself/hostess	TV special Program for New Year
2010	Highway: Rodando la Aventura	Vane	Mini-series

== Singles ==
Year	Title	Album	Notes
2010	Amigas Por Siempre	Highway: Rodando la aventura	with Paulina Holguín, Valeria Baroni and María Clara Alonso
