= Stacey Tendeter =

British actress (1949–2008)

- Born: Andrea Stacey Tendeter; 21 June 1949; Hemel Hempstead, Hertfordshire, England
- Died: 26 October 2008 (aged 59); Hackney, London, England
- Years active: 1971–1994

Stacey Tendeter (21 June 1949 – 26 October 2008) was a British actress best known for her performance as Muriel in the 1971 film Two English Girls. Her other cinematic appearances include White Bird, Friend or Foe, and Terminal Game.

== Early life ==
At the age of 13, Tendeter met her future husband, sculptor Andrew Elton while they were at the King Alfred's School in Hempstead. They were married in 1970 and the following year, she graduated from the Royal Central School of Speech and Drama. Whilst there, she won a fencing competition (with hopes to represent Britain in the 1980 Summer Olympics).

== Career ==
The majority of her work came in the 1970s on British television when she appeared on Elizabeth R, Dead of Night, The Pallisers, In This House of Brede and Doctor Who in the story Underworld. She subsequently performed mostly in the theatre, having performed in The Sentence, School For Sugar and The Scandal. In 1983, she played the wife of Adam Dalgliesh in the ITV adaption of P. D. James' Death of an Expert Witness.

After François Truffaut died in 1984, a director's cut of Two English Girls was released to great acclaim. In particular, the addition of several important scenes featuring Stacey was praised. This is the version currently available on DVD.

== Death ==
For the last few years, Tendeter suffered from breast cancer, preventing her to work in TV, film or theatre as a result. She bravely fought the illness especially in the last two years when things became difficult. She is buried in Western Synagouge Cemetery in Cheshunt.
