= Two English Girls =

- French release poster
- Directed by: François Truffaut
- Screenplay by: François Truffaut; Jean Gruault
- Based on: Les Deux Anglaises et le Continent by Henri-Pierre Roché
- Produced by: Marcel Berbert
- Starring: Jean-Pierre Léaud; Kika Markham; Stacey Tendeter; Sylvia Marriott; Marie Mansart
- Cinematography: Néstor Almendros
- Edited by: Yann Dedet; Martine Barraqué
- Music by: Georges Delerue
- Production companies: Les Films du Carrosse; CinéTel
- Distributed by: Valoria Films
- Release date: 18 November 1971
- Running time: 116 minutes 130 minutes (1984 director's cut)
- Country: France
- Languages: French; English
- Box office: 412,866 admissions (France)

Two English Girls (French: Les Deux Anglaises et le Continent; UK title: Anne and Muriel), is a 1971 French romantic drama film directed by François Truffaut and adapted from a 1956 novel of the same name by Henri-Pierre Roché. It stars Jean-Pierre Léaud as Claude, Kika Markham as Anne, and Stacey Tendeter as Muriel. Truffaut restored 20 minutes of footage, which fills out the characters, before his death in 1984.

The novel was first published in English in 2004, translated by Walter Bruno and published by Cambridge Book Review Press, Cambridge, Wisconsin.

== Plot ==
The film begins in Paris around the year 1902. The narrator (Truffaut himself) explains that Claude Roc and his widowed mother are visited by Anne Brown, daughter of an old friend. Anne invites Claude to spend the summer on the coast of Wales with her widowed mother and sister, Muriel. While she enjoys Claude's company, her hope is that he may be a husband for her introverted sister, who has problems with her eyesight. In the event, Claude and Muriel do start to fall in love and Claude overcomes her initial resistance and persuades her to agree to marriage. Madame Roc, supposedly concerned about their poor health and with the agreement of Mrs Brown, says they must live apart for a year without any communication before getting married.

Returning to France, Claude moves in artistic circles and has affairs with a number of women while Muriel in Wales keeps a diary and becomes increasingly despondent. Claude, with his mother's encouragement, writes to Muriel, breaking off the engagement, as he wishes to be free to focus on his business pursuits. Muriel is devastated. Anne leaves home to study sculpture in Paris, where she loses her virginity to Claude. She agrees to have a non-exclusive affair with Claude, enabling him to continue to have affairs with other women, and eventually has a concurrent relationship with Diurka, a dashing publisher who then takes her off to Persia with Claude's encouragement. Muriel sends her diary, which includes details of her experience of a childhood lesbian event and her consequent prolonged struggle against an urge for masturbation, to Claude, who publishes it against her wishes.

Muriel comes to Paris and she and Claude rekindle their love. However, when Muriel is told by Anne of Claude's affair with her, at Claude's insistence, she collapses into deep depression and returns to Wales. Anne has become engaged to a Frenchman called Nicholas but falls ill and also returns to Wales, dying among her family with Diurka at her side.

Diurka tells Claude that Muriel is leaving home to take a job in Belgium. Claude meets her ship at Calais and they spend that night together in a hotel, during which Muriel also loses her virginity. In the morning, she says they must now part for ever as Claude is unsuited for matrimony, despite his renewed offer of marriage. Later, she writes to say she is pregnant, raising Claude's hopes of marriage, but a second letter says she was mistaken and their relationship is truly at an end. He later hears that Muriel has married and is a schoolteacher with a daughter. Claude turns the whole saga of his relationship with the sisters into a novel, which is published by Diurka.

In an epilogue set in the 1920s, the narrator explains that Claude, who is now a successful author, but unmarried, and whose mother has died, still dreams of the artistic gifts of Anne and the children he and Muriel might have had.

== Cast ==
- Jean-Pierre Léaud as Claude Roc
- Kika Markham as Anne Brown
- Stacey Tendeter as Muriel Brown
- Sylvia Marriott as Mrs. Brown
- Marie Mansart as Madame Roc
- Philippe Léotard as Diurka
- Irène Tunc as Ruta
- Mark Peterson as Mr. Flint
- David Markham as the palmist
- Georges Delerue as Claude's business agent
- Marcel Berbert as the art dealer
- Annie Miler as Monique de Montferrand
- Christine Pellé as Claude's secretary
- Jeanne Lobre as Jeanne
- Marie Iracane as Madame Roc's maidservant
- Jean-Claude Dolbert as the English policeman
- Anne Levaslot as Muriel as a child
- Sophie Jeanne as Clarisse
- René Gaillard as a taxi driver
- Sophie Baker as a friend in the café
- Laura Truffaut as a child
- Eva Truffaut as a child
- Mathieu Schiffman as a child
- Guillaume Schiffman as a child
- François Truffaut as The Narrator

== Production ==
Filming began on 28 April 1971 in Diélette. The portion shot on the Cotentin Peninsula concluded on 27 May 1971, in the village of La Roche, on the hillside above Auderville. A few continuity shots were filmed indoors rather than at the small harbor of Goury as a result of rainy weather. Filming continued in the Paris Region, as well as in the Vivarais (Ardèche) and the Jura.

== Reception ==
On Rotten Tomatoes the film has an approval rating of 87% based on reviews from 15 critics.

Albert Johnson wrote about the film for its local premiere at the San Francisco Film Festival in 1972: "The film is a gorgeously colorful, poignant romance, as delicately ornate and rare as an enamel brooch by Lalique. Truffaut is a genius at this sort of haunting love story, and Two English Girls is cinema-perfection."

The film was a box office flop in France, Truffaut's first unsuccessful film domestically since The Soft Skin.

Disappointed with its reception in France, Truffaut decided to restore over 20 minutes of footage to the film, a project he completed just before he died in 1984. This version was released after his death in 1985. Critics such as Tom Wiener believe it improved the film.
