= The Big Flag =

1954 film

- Directed by: Jacques Pinoteau
- Written by: Jacques Pinoteau; Jean Raynaud; Roger Vercel
- Produced by: André Paulvé
- Starring: Jean Chevrier; Marc Cassot; Marie Mansart
- Cinematography: Roger Arrignon
- Edited by: André Gaudier
- Music by: Henri Verdun
- Production company: DisCina
- Distributed by: Discifilm
- Release date: 21 June 1954
- Running time: 93 minutes
- Country: France
- Language: French

The Big Flag (French: Le grand pavois) is a 1954 French drama film directed by Jacques Pinoteau and starring Jean Chevrier, Marc Cassot and Marie Mansart. It was shot at the Photosonor Studios in Paris. The film's sets were designed by the art director René Moulaert. Location shooting took place on board the French cruiser Jeanne d'Arc at Brest.

== Synopsis ==
The plot follows the crew of a French Navy warship, and one of the officers who tries to adjust to civilian life but ends up returning to the sea. A theme is that of sailors' wives wanting them to build a life ashore, and their instinct to return to the sea.

== Cast ==
- Jean Chevrier as Le lieutenant de marine Jean Favrel
- Marc Cassot as L'élève officier de marine Pierre Hardouin
- Marie Mansart as Simone Favrel
- Nicole Courcel as Madeleine
- Raphaël Patorni as Chéruel
- François Patrice as Derval
- Roger Crouzet as Ferrand
- Jean-Pierre Mocky as Luc Dutoit - un midship
- Jean Murat as Le capitaine Jabert
- Raymond Hermantier as Leduc
- Micheline Gary as Françoise Aubry
- Jean Lanier as Paul Aubry
- Nicole Besnard as Corinne
- Marie d'Hyvert as Monique
- Bernard Dhéran as Lucien Barré
- Jean Gaven as Le lieutenant Lachenal
- Maurice Sarfati as Un midship
- Yves Brainville as Un lieutenant
- André Carnège as Le ministre

== Bibliography ==
- Lemonier, Marc. Guide des lieux cultes du cinéma en France. Horay, 2005.
- Rège, Philippe. Encyclopedia of French Film Directors, Volume 1. Scarecrow Press, 2009.
