= America the Beautiful (TV series) =

- Genre: Nature documentary
- Narrated by: Michael B. Jordan
- Composer: Joe Trapanese
- Country of origin: United States
- Original language: English
- No. of seasons: 1
- No. of episodes: 6

Production
- Production company: National Geographic

Original release
- Network: Disney+
- Release: July 4, 2022

America the Beautiful is a documentary television series dedicated to showcase North America's natural diversity and extreme conditions. The series is narrated by Michael B. Jordan and premiered on Disney+ on July 4, 2022, as a Disney+ Original, under the National Geographic banner. The series was removed from Disney+ on May 26, 2023.

== Production ==
National Geographic produced the series as a streaming exclusive for Disney. Before the showed premiered in July 2022, Disney announced that they would be working with V/SPEED Films on the series, who supplied footage that was captured using cinema-grade cameras mounted to fighter jets, which is a first for the industry. Joe Trapanese composed the score of the documentary.

== Episodes ==
No.	Title	Original release date
1	"Land of Heroes"	July 4, 2022
Meet the untamed heroes of the wildest, most beautiful continent on Earth.
2	"Waterland"	July 4, 2022
Animals must master both water and land in the beautiful southeastern USA.
3	"Northland"	July 4, 2022
Witness epic winters and spectacular summers, where timing is everything.
4	"Wild West"	July 4, 2022
Wild heroes forge a living in the deserts and coasts of the American West.
5	"Heartland"	July 4, 2022
In the most extreme place on Earth, animals must seize every opportunity.
6	"Brave New World"	July 4, 2022
Witness the heroes fighting to preserve America's wildlife and wild places.

== Release ==
The series was released on July 4, 2022, coinciding with Independence Day in the United States. It consists of six episodes.

== Reception ==
=== Critical response ===
The review aggregator website Rotten Tomatoes reported a 100% approval rating with an average rating of 7.90/10, based on 5 critic reviews. Metacritic gave the series a weighted average score of 84 out of 100 based on 4 critic reviews, indicating "generally favorable reviews".

Joel Keller of Decider wrote, "Despite the series' scattershot focus, America The Beautiful has more than enough spectacular footage to satisfy fans of nature docuseries." John Anderson of The Wall Street Journal said, "It's a feel-good physical exam of the third largest and "most diverse" continent, environmentally speaking, and while there's no voice saying, "I'm North America and I approve this message," if a place could run for president, this show could be the campaign ad."

Stephanie Morgan of Common Sense Media gave America the Beautiful a grade of 4 out of 5 stars, praised the presence of educational value, and complimented the positive messages and role models, writing, "Nature footage and storytelling like nothing seen before." Aimee Mills of Collider included America the Beautiful in their "10 Best Wildlife Documentaries On Disney+ Right Now" list, saying, "With stunning shots of nature at its finest, it's a great new series to get stuck into if you're in the mood for beautiful landscape visuals from the Arctic to the deep South."
