= Stain in the Snow =

1954 film

- Directed by: Luis Saslavsky
- Written by: Luis Saslavsky; André Tabet
- Based on: La neige était sale by Georges Simenon
- Produced by: Fritz Bukofzer
- Starring: Daniel Gélin; Valentine Tessier; Marie Mansart
- Cinematography: André Bac
- Edited by: Isabelle Elman
- Music by: René Cloërec
- Production company: Les Films Tellus
- Distributed by: Les Films Marceau
- Release date: 19 February 1954
- Running time: 110 minutes
- Country: France
- Language: French

Stain in the Snow (French: La neige était sale) is a 1954 French crime film directed by Luis Saslavsky and starring Daniel Gélin, Valentine Tessier and Marie Mansart. It was shot at the Photosonor Studios in Paris. The film's sets were designed by the art director René Moulaert. It is based on a 1948 novel of the same title by Georges Simenon. It attracted audiences of over two million at the French box office. The setting was shifted from Nazi-occupied France to a fictional country under German occupation during the Second World War.

== Synopsis ==
Frank is brought up in a brothel by his prostitute mother. As he grows up he becomes increasingly criminal and violent.

== Cast ==
- Daniel Gélin as Frank Friedmayer
- Valentine Tessier as Mme Irma
- Marie Mansart as Suzy Holtz
- Daniel Ivernel as Krommer
- Véra Norman as Moune
- Nadine Basile as Bertha
- Paul Faivre as Le concierge
- Joëlle Bernard as Une fille
- Camille Guérini as Le commissaire
- Claude Vernier as L'officier
- Jo Dest as Un Allemand
- Robert Moor as Le professeur
- Jean-Pierre Mocky as Le violoniste
- Antoine Balpêtré as Holtz
- Georges Tabet as Un Allemand

== Bibliography ==
- Goble, Alan. The Complete Index to Literary Sources in Film. Walter de Gruyter, 1999.
- Walker-Morrison, Deborah. Classic French Noir: Gender and the Cinema of Fatal Desire. Bloomsbury Publishing, 2020.
