= Marie Mansart =

French film actress

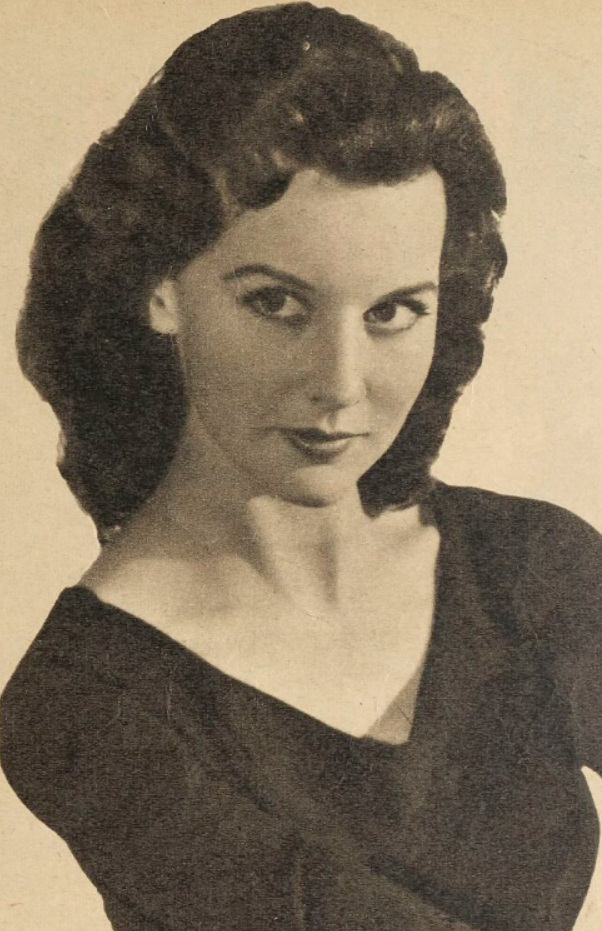
- Born: 5 March 1925; Dijon, France
- Died: 12 January 2012 (aged 86); Ivry-sur-Seine, France
- Occupation: Actress
- Years active: 1953-1982 (film)

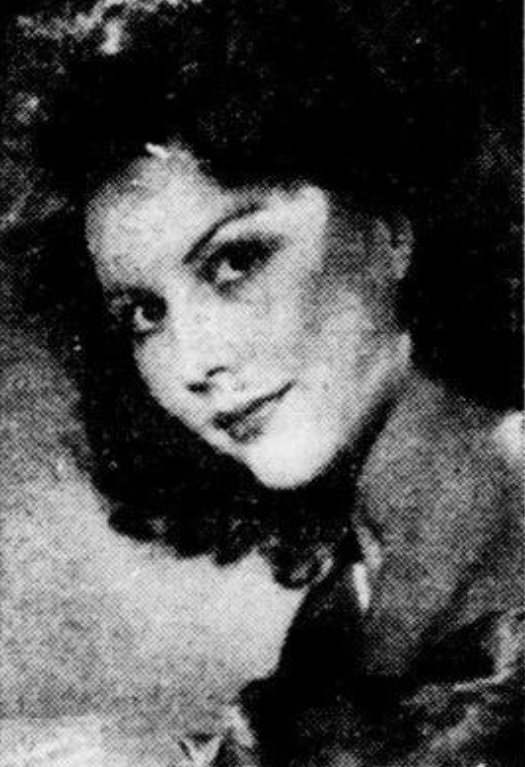
Portrait of Marie Mansart published in the newspaper "La Bourgogne républicaine" on April 08, 1952

Marie Mansart (1925–2012) was a French film and television actress. She played the female lead in several films during the early 1950s.

== Selected filmography ==
- The Big Flag (1954)
- Stain in the Snow (1954)
- Royal Affairs in Versailles (1954)
- Napoleon (1955)
- Recourse in Grace (1960)
- Café du square (1969, TV series)
- Two English Girls (1971)
- Mado (1976)
- The Tiger Brigades (1978, TV series)
- Dedicatoria (1980)

== Bibliography ==
- Biggs, Melissa E. French films, 1945-1993: a critical filmography of the 400 most important releases. McFarland & Company, 1996.
- Holmes, Diana & Ingram, Robert. Francois Truffaut. Manchester University Press, 2019.
