= The Three Detectives (TV series) =

- Die drei !!!
- Genre: Mystery; Adventure
- Created by: Sina Flammang; Doris Laske
- Based on: Three Investigators by Robert Arthur Jr.
- Screenplay by: Sina Flammang; Doris Laske
- Directed by: Barbara Kronenberg; Kim Strobl
- Music by: Torsten Kamps; Heiko Maile
- Country of origin: Germany
- Original language: German
- No. of seasons: 1
- No. of episodes: 10

Production
- Producer: Christian Becker
- Running time: 41 minutes

Original release
- Network: Disney+
- Release: 6 September 2023

The Three Detectives (German: Die drei !!!) is a German mystery adventure television series that premiered on Disney+ on 6 September 2023. The series is adaption of Three Investigators about three young detectives, played by Purnima Grätz (Kim), Bella Bading (Franzi) and Lilith Jonah (Marie).

At the 2024 Grimme-Preis Awards, the three lead actresses Bading, Grätz and Johna were awarded the Grimme Special Prize for their ensemble performance in the series.

== Summary ==
The Three Detectives follows the adventures of three best friends: Kim, Marie, and Franzi. They form their own detective club and use their courage, charm, and confidence to solve various cases while navigating their everyday teenage lives. The mysteries they tackle range from theft and blackmail to cyberbullying and social justice issues. Despite their differences, the trio always supports each other and manages to crack every case.
