= Weekend Family =

French comedy web tv series

- French: Week-End Family
- Genre: Comedy
- Created by: Baptiste Filleul
- Written by: Géraldine de Margerie; Nour Ben Salem; Cécile Lugiez; Julie-Anna Grignon; Marion Carnel; Paul Madillo
- Directed by: Sophie Reine; Pierre-François Martin-Laval
- Country of origin: France
- Original language: French
- No. of seasons: 2
- No. of episodes: 16

Production
- Producers: Sandra Ouaiss; Dorothée Woillez; Nathalie Majdar
- Running time: 24–46 minutes
- Production company: Elephant International

Original release
- Network: Disney+
- Release: February 23, 2022 – April 5, 2023

Weekend Family (French: Week-End Family) is a French comedy television series for children and teenagers, which is produced by Elephant International for the Walt Disney Company. The series premiered on February 23, 2022, on Disney+ in select countries.

In July 2022, the series was renewed for a second season. Season 2 premiered on April 5, 2023.

== Plot ==
Fred is the fun and irresistible father of a very diverse family. As a perpetual joker, he tries to be a good father to his daughters Clara (15 years), Victoire (12 years) and Romy (9 years), for whom he only takes custody on weekends. Although his daughters' mothers love Fred, Laurence, Marie-Ange and Helena all had good reasons to leave him. The mothers are never far away, and neither is Stan, Fred's best friend. When Fred falls madly in love with Emmanuelle, a Québécois woman living in Paris who studied child psychology and is doing her doctorate, a new phase in life begins for both of them. Emmanuelle, who cannot always rely on the advice of her best friend Cora, has to break away from books and theory every weekend in order to get along with her new family, including Fred's ex-partners.

== Cast ==
Character	Actor	Voice actor
Fred	Éric Judor	Evan Arnold
Emmanuelle „Emma"	Daphnée Côté Hallé	Jessie Hendricks
Clara	Liona Bordonaro	Victoria Washington
Romy	Roxane Barrazuol	Lila Karp-Ziring
Victoire „Vic"	Midie Dreyfus	Lily Sanfelippo
Marie-Ange	Jeanne Bournaud	Liza Seneca
Helena	Annabel Lopez	Presciliana Esparolini
Laurence	Annelise Hesme	Robyn Cohen
Stan	Hafid F. Benamar	Matt Flynn
Cora	Séphora Pondi	Aurelia Michael

== Episodes ==
Series overview
Season	Episodes	Originally released
1	8	February 23, 2022
Special	1	December 9, 2022
2	8	April 5, 2023

=== Season 1 (2022) ===
No. overall	No. in season	Title	Directed by	Written by	Original release date
1	1	"Fresh Start" "Nouveau départ"	Pierre-François Martin-Laval	Géraldine de Margerie & Nour Ben Salem	February 23, 2022
Fred and Emma are madly in love but since Emma is due back to Canada to finish her thesis, Fred hasn't told his kids. When they find out, Romy plots to keep Emma and Fred apart. Which means that neither Fred nor Emma know that the other wants to stay together.
2	2	"Zero Waste" "Zéro conso"	Pierre-François Martin-Laval	Géraldine de Margerie & Nour Ben Salem	February 23, 2022
As they drop off the girls on Friday night, the three exes invite themselves at Fred's for Sunday Brunch in order to get to know Emma. Clara imposes a "zero waste" challenge on the family: no one is allowed to buy anything for the whole weekend. Romy is beside herself because she's lost her binky and Emma is convinced it's her fault.
3	3	"Double Axel" "Double axel"	Pierre-François Martin-Laval	Cécile Lugiez & Julie-Anna Grignon	February 23, 2022
Marie-Ange gets the family a virtual assistant, which Vic and Romy are delighted about. Clara learns to respect Emma's privacy. Romy, completely addicted to an online game, is furious when she finds out Emma mentions her in her thesis. The tension is at its height when Fred inadvertently spills water all over Emma's computer.
4	4	"The Deep End" "Sous l'eau"	Pierre-François Martin-Laval	Cécile Lugiez & Julie-Anna Grignon	February 23, 2022
This weekend, Fred is ill so Emma has to take care of the girls all by herself. Vic has a synchronized swimming competition this Sunday and is nervous because of her tyrannical coach, Clara insists on going to an environmental protest on Saturday night, and Romy plays nurse at her father's bedside.
5	5	"The Neighbor's Get Together" "La fête des voisins"	Sophie Reine	Marion Carnel & Paul Madillo	February 23, 2022
At the neighbors' get-together, Emma realizes that her new thesis advisor is none other than the rigid president of the freeholder's association, who's also not a fan of Fred's annoying and noisy family. The girls come up with a plan to make sure he takes a liking to Emma. Clara gets a letter from Alexis.
6	6	"The Ranch's Farewell" "Adieu au ranch"	Sophie Reine	Marion Carnel & Paul Madillo	February 23, 2022
Clara wants to get rid of her childhood things and sell them at the flea market this Sunday. Romy struggles to welcome changes in her family dynamic. Vic gets help from Emma to help her little sister express her feelings. Emma has doubts about her career path. Fred must accept that his eldest is growing up.
7	7	"Back to Nature" "Le retour à la nature"	Sophie Reine	Géraldine de Margerie & Nour Ben Salem	February 23, 2022
The family, Alexis, Stan and Marie Ange go on an adventure in the Fontainebleau forest for Vic's birthday. The program: a Treasure Trail and then back to the lodge for a "truth or dare" party. Emma gets a phone call with a tempting offer that could change everything...
8	8	"Do-Over" "Tout recommence"	Sophie Reine	Géraldine de Margerie & Nour Ben Salem	February 23, 2022
It's Mothers' Day weekend. Emma has doubts about the new life she's embarking upon. The girls are worried that their father and Emma are breaking up and surprise them to rekindle the flame. Clara sends a text to Alexis by mistake and Emma gives her piece of advice to give her the courage she needs.

=== Special (2022) ===
Title	Directed by	Written by	Original release date
"Weekend Family Christmas Special" "Week-end Family : Un Noël gagnant-gagnant"	Pierre-François Martin-Laval	Éric Judor, Baptiste Nicolaï & Hafid F. Benamar	December 9, 2022

=== Season 2 (2023) ===
No. overall	No. in season	Title	Directed by	Written by	Original release date
9	1	"Operation Venice" "Opération Venise"	Julien Guetta	Unknown	April 5, 2023
Fred and Emma are celebrating one year of living together. Even though Emma is very busy with work and says she wants to celebrate with a good movie and a pizza, Fred lets himself be convinced by Stan that he needs to wow her. So Fred decides to recreate Venice for Emma, but without leaving Paris! Quite an ambitious plan, and the timing could be better. Romy, moody because her pregnant mom won't stop talking about her future baby, decides that she wants to live at Fred and Emma's during the week. Vic is in a phase where she showers… very rarely. And to top it off, Clara imposes drastic measures on the family to consume less.
10	2	"Surprise Surprise"	Unknown	Unknown	April 5, 2023
Grandma Jo, Fred's mother, shows up by surprise at her son's. Fred is certain that she is going to ask him to move in with the family for good. In a panic, Fred drowns himself in unbelievable lies. On her end, Clara tries by any means possible to hide from her father the fact that she has been kicked out of school for two days. And the icing on the cake: Vic and Romy put Helena's "gender reveal" party in jeopardy.
11	3	"The Party" "La Boum"	Unknown	Unknown	April 5, 2023
For her birthday, Romy is organizing her first party and really wants to impress her friend Sarah-Jane. She pulls out all the stops: Clara is in charge of getting the cake and Vic is in charge of entrances and exits and most importantly of making sure that Fred and Emma stay away from the living room, as the party is kids-only! But Fred is panicking at the thought of his youngest having her first party without any adults and is afraid things will get out of hand. While Emma has a very important meeting during the party, Fred has a hard time staying put.
12	4	"Who Framed Fred" "Qui veut la peau de Fred"	Unknown	Unknown	April 5, 2023
Between Vic who has not started reading for a test taking place the following Monday, Romy who was caught cheating at school and Clara who is setting the record for most mistakes on her drivers' test, the weekend is off to a pretty bad start. But when Fred discovers online that a certain Coconut12 has not only given him a zero as a physio, but also left a slanderous comment, it's the last drop. Fred vows to expose Coconut12. Emma, the girls and even Stan are going to help him in his quest by coming up with questionable stratagems.
13	5	"Your Mothers and Me" "Vos mères et moi"	Unknown	Unknown	April 5, 2023
Outside school, Nolan whispers something to Vic who does not manage to hear everything. Back home, she asks Romy and Clara for some advice in order to understand whether or not Nolan likes her. Since Emma is away at a seminar, Fred cannot help himself from meddling in Vic's love life and he proposes to tell her all about how he met Laurence, Marie-Ange and Helena. We dive into the past to discover Fred's flirting techniques, which are not always efficient!
14	6	"All Aboard!" "Attention au départ"	Unknown	Unknown	April 5, 2023
Like every year, the entire family gets together at Marie-Ange's to organize the summer holidays by taking into account everyone's constraints. But this time, there is too much pressure on Marie-Ange and Emma accepts to take over the schedule. She quickly realizes that it is quite the head-scratcher! Clara has her own secret plan for the holidays, much to Fred's dismay. Fred plans on dissuading her by making her go through a series of impossible tests. Vic, on the contrary, does not have the courage to tell Fred that she does not want to go to basketball camp anymore. While Fred spends the weekend trying to discourage the girls from changing their plans, Romy busies herself. As for Emma, she makes a surprising discovery, one she cannot tell anyone about.
15	7	"Radio Caroline"	Hafid F. Benamar	Unknown	April 5, 2023
Fred pokes fun at Emma laying around in her pajamas and calls her a 'granny'. Slightly hurt, Emma fights back by pointing out that Fred never finishes what he started. Fred is wounded and tries by any means possible to finish putting together the piece of furniture that they plan to gift to Jean and Helena for their baby's birth. Meanwhile, Emma pushes herself to get out of the house and runs into an old college friend, the very chatty Caroline. Unable to get a sentence in, Emma gets stuck in a quid pro quo leaving Caroline to believe that Clara is her neighbor. Thanks to Caroline, Clara gets a job in an art gallery displaying the work of her favorite artist, but will quickly realize he's not as admirable as she thought he was".
16	8	"Home Sweet Home"	Hafid F. Benamar	Unknown	April 5, 2023
When a real estate agent knocks on the door to tell the family that the owner of the apartment has decided to sell, panic ensues. Fred, committed to staying in the home where his daughters grew up, calls a war council. They have to come up with a strategy to discourage any potential buyer. But not everyone is as determined: Emma can see herself living in a new apartment and Vic dreams of having her own room. In the mix of it all, Clara tries to choose her options for the upcoming baccalaureate.

== Release ==
The series premiered on February 23, 2022, on Disney+ in France, Canada, Benelux, Scandinavia, Spain, Portugal, Australia, New Zealand, Singapore, Hong Kong and Taiwan (including Disney+ Hotstar in Indonesia, Malaysia and Thailand). The series debuted in the US, UK, Ireland and Italy on March 9, 2022.

The second season premiered in France on April 5, 2023.

== Reception ==
Joel Keller of Decider found the chemistry between the characters uplifting across their relationships, stating that it succeeds to avoid the portrayal of excessive and trite responses provided by other sitcoms, while complimenting the humor and the character development. Joly Herman of Common Sense Media rated the series 4 out of 5 stars, praised the show for its promotion of love and acceptance, found that the series depicts different positive role models, and complimented the diversity of the characters.
