= Aruna's Magic =

- A Magia de Aruna
- Genre: Drama; Coming of age Fantasy
- Created by: Maíra Oliveira
- Directed by: Eduardo Vaisman; Rodrigo Van Der Put
- Starring: Giovanna Ewbank, Cleo, Erika Januza, Suzana Pires, Jamilly Mariano, Caio Manhente
- Country of origin: Brazil
- Original language: Portuguese
- No. of seasons: 1
- No. of episodes: 6

Production
- Running time: 32 minutes

Original release
- Network: Disney+
- Release: 29 November 2023 – present

Aruna's Magic is a Brazilian television series that premiered on Disney+ on November 29, 2023. The series is created by Maíra Oliveira and stars Giovanna Ewbank, Cleo, Erika Januza, Suzana Pires, Jamilly Mariano, and Caio Manhente.

== Plot ==
In search of her place, Mima, a teenager afraid to own up to her power, awakens three witches from the past, who set her on a journey to recover Aruna, a particle capable of reactivating magic and restoring solar balance to the world.

== Cast ==
- Giovanna Ewbank as Juno
- Cleo as Cloe
- Erika Januza as Latifa
- Suzana Pires as Bruma
- Jamilly Mariano as Mima
- Caio Manhente as Ariel

== Episodes ==
1. "Garota estranha"
2. "Acalma teu coração"
3. "Uma de nós"
4. "A Hora é Agora"
5. "Fim do mundo"
6. "Juntas"

== Production ==
On March 31, 2022, Disney+ announced the start of filming for the first season of the series. The series is created by Maíra Oliveira and produced by Disney+. It premiered on November 29, 2023.
