= Valeria Baroni =

Argentine actress, singer and dancer

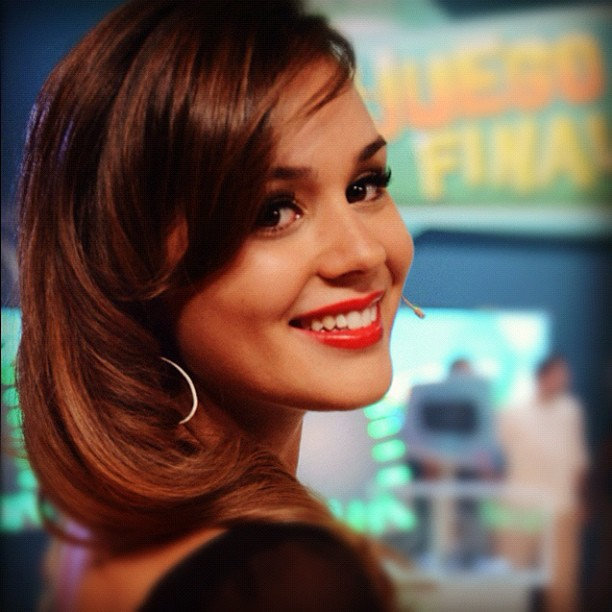
- Born: October 6, 1989 (age 36); Buenos Aires

Valeria Soledad Baroni (born October 6, 1989 in Buenos Aires, Argentina) is an actress, singer, and dancer. She is best known for driving the Zapping Zone program that was broadcast throughout Latin America by Disney Channel. Her passion for music, singing, dancing and acting brought her to participate in High School Musical: The Challenge, a local version of the American High School Musical, in which she played one of the main characters.

== Life and career ==
In 2007, Baroni was selected to join the reality show High School Musical: The Selection, a casting which contained the actors who were part of the local version of the American High School Musical.

== Filmography ==
Year	Title	Character	Producer
2008	High School Musical: The Challenge	Herself	Walt Disney Pictures

=== Television ===
Year	Title	Character	Notes
2007	High School Musical: The Selection	Herself	Participant and part of the 8 finalists, the reality show of Disney Channel Latin America and Channel 13
2009-12	Zapping Zone	Conductive	Disney Channel Latin America
2010	Highway: Rolling Adventure	Herself	Main role, series of Disney Channel Latin America
2011	When the bell rings	Michelle	Special guest, series of Disney Channel Latin America
2011	Disney's Friends for Change Games	Herself	Green team
2011	We Can Change the World	Herself	Video musical of Disney's Friends for Change Games
2013	Violetta	Lara	Series of Disney Channel Latin America
2013	The U-Mix Show	Herself	Series of Disney Channel Latin America
2016	What a Talent!	Victoria	Series of Disney Channel Brazil
