= Mila in the Multiverse =

2023 Brazilian television series

- Portuguese: Mila no Multiverso
- Genre: Science fiction; Mystery; Comedy drama; Adventure
- Written by: Cássio Koshikumo; Janaína Tokitaka
- Directed by: Júlia Jordão
- Country of origin: Brazil
- Original language: Portuguese
- No. of seasons: 2
- No. of episodes: 16

Production
- Producer: Tiago Mello
- Production location: São Paulo
- Running time: 30 minutes
- Production companies: Nonstop; Boutique Filmes

Original release
- Network: Disney+ (season 1); Disney Channel (season 2)
- Release: 25 January 2023 – 25 July 2024

Mila in the Multiverse (Portuguese: Mila no Multiverso) is a Brazilian science fiction television series for children and adolescents, produced by Nonstop and Boutique Filmes for the Walt Disney Company. In Brazil, the eight-part first season of the series was released on 25 January 2023 on Disney+.

== Plot ==
For her 16th birthday, Mila receives a very special present. Mila can now travel back and forth between different parallel universes to look for her mother, Elis. But Mila soon discovers that her mother's disappearance is just the beginning of the story and her journey. Since Elis found out that several universes actually exist in parallel, she has been hunted by a mysterious group called "Os Operadores". Mila has to adjust to this new and extremely dangerous situation and receives support from her friends Juliana, Vinícius and Pierre. Together with them Mila travels the huge multiverse in search of her mother Elis. An unbelievable adventure full of surprises and dangers awaits the friends.

== Cast and characters ==
- Laura Luz as Mila, a student from São Paulo in Universe 1S34T ("Home"), and Elis Olena's daughter.
  - Luz also portrays Ludmila, an alternate version of Mila from Universe D07P8 ("Institute").
- Malu Mader as Elis Olena, the mother of Mila and a target of the Operators.
  - Mader also portrays an alternate version of Elis in Universe D07P8 ("Institute"), a professor at the alchemical institute. In "This Might be my Last Message" it is revealed that Operator Zero is another version of Elis.
- Yuki Sugimoto as Juliana, a student at the alchemical institute.
  - Sugimoto also portrays Ju, an alternate version of Juliana from Mila's home universe.
- Dani Flomin as Pierre, a student at both Mila's school and the alchemical institute who's witnessed an astronomical event that enabled him to inhabit any of his alternate consciousnesses across the multiverse.
  - Flomin also portrays an alternate version of Pierre from Mila's home universe.
- João Victor as Vinícius, a student at the alchemical institute and a friend of Juliana's.
  - Victor also portrays an alternate version of Vinícius in Mila's home universe.
- Rafaela Mandelli as Verônica, the dean of the alchemical institute.
  - Mandelli also portrays an alternate version of Verônica from Mila's home universe, the principal of her school, and an Operator version.
- Felipe Montanari as Bóris, a professor at the alchemical institute.
  - Montanari also portrays an alternate version of Bóris from Mila's home universe, a teacher at her school, and an Operator version.
- Danilo de Moura as Domênico, a teacher at Mila's school.
  - De Moura also portrays an alternate version of Domênico, a teacher at her school, in the alchemical institute universe.
- Amanda Lyra as Ilka, a professor at the alchemical institute.
- Jader Januario as Felipe, a student at the alchemical institute, and the ex-boyfriend of Vinícius.

== Episodes ==
Series	Episodes	Originally released		
Series	Episodes	First released	Last released	Network
1	8	25 January 2023		Disney+
2	8	15 July 2024	25 July 2024	Disney Channel

=== Season 1 ===
No. overall	No. in season	Title	Directed by	Written by	Original release date
1	1	"Really, Mom?" (Portuguese: É Sério, mãe?)	Júlia Jordão	Cássio Koshikumo & Janaína Tokitaka	25 January 2023
2	2	"I Hate this Place, Food's Great Though" (Portuguese: Eu Odeio Esse Lugar, mas Essa Comida é Ótima)	Júlia Jordão	Cássio Koshikumo & Janaína Tokitaka	25 January 2023
3	3	"Actually, Many Things Explode Down Here" (Portuguese: Aliás, Muita Coisa Aqui Explode)	Júlia Jordão	Cássio Koshikumo & Janaína Tokitaka	25 January 2023
4	4	"Knowing is a lot Worse Than not Knowing" (Portuguese: Saber é Muito Pior do que não Saber)	Júlia Jordão	Cássio Koshikumo & Janaína Tokitaka	25 January 2023
5	5	"Run!" (Portuguese: Foge!)	Júlia Jordão	Cássio Koshikumo & Janaína Tokitaka	25 January 2023
6	6	"Inside Another Ludmila's Body" (Portuguese: Eu tô no Corpo de Outra Ludmila)	Júlia Jordão	Cássio Koshikumo & Janaína Tokitaka	25 January 2023
7	7	"You Should've Listened to Your Mother" (Portuguese: Você Devia ter Obedecido a sua mãe)	Júlia Jordão	Cássio Koshikumo & Janaína Tokitaka	25 January 2023
8	8	"This Might be my Last Message" (Portuguese: Talvez Essa Seja a Minha Última Mensagem pra Você)	Júlia Jordão	Cássio Koshikumo & Janaína Tokitaka	25 January 2023

=== Season 2 ===
No. overall	No. in season	Title	Directed by	Written by	Original release date
9	1	TBA (Portuguese: Em que Universo Você Tá Agora?)	Unknown	Unknown	15 July 2024
10	2	TBA (Portuguese: Sou Eu, Pai)	Unknown	Unknown	16 July 2024
11	3	TBA (Portuguese: Adeus, Futuro)	Unknown	Unknown	17 July 2024
12	4	TBA (Portuguese: Mãe! Acorda! Mãe!)	Unknown	Unknown	18 July 2024
13	5	TBA (Portuguese: Somos Amigas em Todos os Universos!)	Unknown	Unknown	22 July 2024
14	6	TBA (Portuguese: Uma Aberração!)	Unknown	Unknown	23 July 2024
15	7	TBA (Portuguese: É a Vingança do Coração)	Unknown	Unknown	24 July 2024
16	8	TBA (Portuguese: Acho que o Multiverso Gosta de Mim)	Unknown	Unknown	25 July 2024
