= Intertwined (TV series) =

Argentine young people's television series

- Spanish: Entrelazados
- Genre: Comedy drama; Fantasy; Musical
- Created by: Jorge Edelstein
- Composer: Sergei Grosny
- Country of origin: Argentina
- Original language: Spanish
- No. of seasons: 2
- No. of episodes: 17

Production
- Executive producers: Fernando Barbosa; Leonardo Aranguibel; Cecilia Mendonça; Gabe Bossi; Pol Bossi
- Production locations: Buenos Aires, Argentina
- Cinematography: Santiago Guzmán
- Editors: Inti Nieto; Julián Garro; Luciano Sosa
- Running time: 34–54 minutes
- Production companies: Pampa Films; Gloriamundi Producciones

Original release
- Network: Disney+
- Release: November 12, 2021 – May 24, 2023

Intertwined (Spanish: Entrelazados) is an Argentine comedy-drama television series for children and adolescents, which is produced by Pampa Films and Gloriamundi Producciones for The Walt Disney Company. The series premiered in Latin America, the UK, the US and other select countries on November 12, 2021, on Disney+.

On May 2, 2022, the series was renewed for a second season, which was released on May 24, 2023. On September 8, 2024, Agustina Benavides confirmed that the series was cancelled after two seasons.

== Plot ==
16-year-old Allegra has a great passion for musical comedies and dreams of becoming part of the musical theater group Eleven O'Clock as the leading actress in Freaky Friday. With the same play that made her grandmother Cocó, a living legend of musical theater, famous many years ago. Allegra looks up to her grandmother and wants to be a talented actress one day. But the events of the past that shaped the complicated and troubled relationship between her grandmother Coco and Allegra's mother, Caterina, have had a profound impact on Allegra's life. However, this changes dramatically when Allegra finds a mysterious bracelet in her room, which brings her to 1994. In the year in which Caterina, the same age as Allegra in the present, was just starting her own career with Eleven O'Clock. A career in the shadow of her mother Cocó, who was already a star then and at the height of her career. Allegra uses her time in the past to learn more about her family's history. Allegra will try to heal the wounds and bring her family back together. But will Allegra manage to change the past to make her dream come true?

== Cast ==
=== Main ===
- Carolina Domenech as Allegra Sharp/Laura
- Clara Alonso as Caterina Sharp
  - Manuela Menéndez (Note: Manuela Menéndez appears in 2x06 but is still credited as a series regular.) portrays a young Caterina in 1994.
- Elena Roger as Amelia "Cocó" Sharp
  - Antonia Bengoechea (season 2) portrays a young Cocó in 1975.
- Lucila Gandolfo (Note: Lucila Gandolfo appears in 2x01 but is still credited as a series regular.) as Lucía Sharp
  - Betina O'Connell (season 2) portrays a young Lucía in 1975.
- José Giménez Zapiola as Marco Resco
- Paula Morales as Greta (season 1)
  - Tatu Glikman (Note: Tatu Glikman appears in 2x06 but is still credited as a series regular.) portrays a young Greta in 1994.
- Kevsho as Félix Sacanell
- Benjamín Amadeo as Diego Lasso
  - Manuel Ramos (actor) (Note: Manuel Ramos appears in 2x05 and 2x06 but is still credited as a series regular.) portrays a young Diego in 1994.
- Berenice Gandullo (Note: Berenice Gandullo is credited as a series regular from 1x07 onwards. She appears in 1x06, but is not credited.) as Bárbara Diz
  - Abril Suliansky (Note: Abril Suliansky appears in 2x06 but is still credited as a series regular.) portrays a young Bárbara in 1994.
- Emilia Mernes as Sofía Lasso (season 1)
- Simón Hempe as Alan Sacanell (season 1)
- Rodrigo Pedreira as Franco Resco
  - Santiago Achaga (season 2) portrays a young Franco.
- Franco Piffaretti as Dante (Note: Franco Piffaretti appears in 2x06 but is still credited as a series regular.)
- Favio Posca as Mike (Note: Favio Posca appears in 2x06 but is still credited as a series regular.)
- Fabio Aste as Tomás Diz (season 1)
- Rocío Hernández as Paloma (season 2)
- Agustina Benavides as Clara (season 2)
- Miguel Habud Pedro Alcaraz (season 2)
  - Alberto de Carabassa portrays a young Pedro in 1975.
- Regina Lamm as Grandma Allegra (season 2)
- Pietro Gian as Antonio Resco (season 2)

=== Recurring ===
Role	In the year	Actor	Voice actor
Miriam	1994	Magela Zanotta	
Camilo	1994	Máximo Ruiz	
Oliverio Gerard	1994	Fito Yannelli	
Theater guard	1994	Curly Jiménez	

== Episodes ==
=== Series overview ===
Season	Episodes	Originally released
1	10	November 12, 2021
2	7	May 24, 2023

=== Season 1 (2021) ===
No. overall	No. in season	Title	Directed by	Written by	Original release date
1	1	"The Bracelet" "El brazalete"	Nicolás Silbert & Leandro Mark	Laura Farhi, Javier Castro Albano & Claudio Lacelli	November 12, 2021
Allegra wants to join Eleven O'Clock by auditioning for the Freaky Friday lead role that made her grandmother Cocó a well-respected legend of musical theater, despite her mother Caterina being openly against it. Allegra secretly escapes, with her best friend, next-door neighbor and aspiring filmmaker Félix covering for her until he is caught by Caterina and finds out about her daughter's predicament through a registration paper. Caterina pulls Allegra out of her audition before she can finish; the two argue until they are hit by an oncoming car, with Caterina lying in a comatose state while Allegra only suffers minor injuries. After Cocó takes her home, Allegra finds a mysterious bracelet that brings her to 1994 where she finds out that Caterina herself used to be part of Eleven O'Clock but her relationship with Cocó was tense, although Caterina gets along with her grandmother Lucía, also Cocó's mother and Allegra's great-grandmother. Allegra becomes instantly infatuated with Marco and makes enemies with the self-centered and shallow Greta, Caterina's arch-rival, who is also Marco's girlfriend in that timeline and a judge of Eleven O'Clock in the present. After watching her dance and accidentally fall, Allegra rushes to aid Caterina, and she hugs her, causing her to recoil and ask her who she is.
2	2	"Back to the Past" "Volver al pasado"	Nicolás Silbert & Leandro Mark	Laura Farhi & Javier Castro Albano	November 12, 2021
Caterina calls security on Allegra to have her detained until the bracelet transports her back to the present. Caterina is still at the hospital but Allegra is told that she will pull through. Allegra arrives at Eleven O'Clock just as the judges are about to leave. After some hesitation and hearing Allegra sing, they finally agree to give her a chance, but Greta still reminds Allegra that she has to get her mother to sign an authorization since she is a minor. She explains to Félix the situation about the past timeline and her mother having been part of the company; he doesn't believe her until the bracelet activates and transports her again to 1994, where she meets Lucía for the first time. Sneaking into the theater again, Allegra, going by the name of Laura to hide her true identity, makes more discoveries: Caterina is secretly dating Diego, also a member of the company in the past and a judge in the present as well, behind Cocó's back, and overhears Greta discussing with her best friend and goon Bárbara her plan to sabotage Caterina so that she gets the lead role for herself. Allegra then tries to audition in front of Cocó and the other members, but she gets rejected as a result.
3	3	"The Moment" "El momento"	Nicolás Silbert & Leandro Mark	Laura Farhi & Javier Castro Albano	November 12, 2021
Marco comforts Allegra after her failed attempt to impress Cocó. The unlikely pairing bonds over their passion for music as they visit a music store where Diego works at, much to the jealousy of Greta, until the bracelet takes Allegra back to the present just as she tries to get in touch with Caterina. Assuming Greta is the reason her mother gave up on the company and is a disgruntled former member because of it, Allegra plans to foil her scheme. Caterina eventually returns to the house where she, Allegra and Cocó have a quite awkward dinner which ends with Caterina grounding Allegra after an unidentified person sends her a video of Allegra singing for the Eleven O'Clock judges. Nonetheless, Cocó encourages Allegra to fulfill her dreams and get her mother to accept that this is her true passion. The bracelet activates once again, and Caterina becomes worried when Allegra is nowhere to be seen. Back in 1994, Allegra manages to thwart Greta's trap for Caterina by throwing her aside. Because of this, Caterina gets the lead role instead of Greta and Allegra becomes a member of the company. In addition, Marco is revealed to be leading a double life as he has to attend the company and at the same time fulfill every of his stern father Franco's orders as he opposes his son's passion for music and wants him to study economics at college while working part-time at his financial company.
4	4	"CD Room" "CD Room"	Nicolás Silbert & Leandro Mark	Laura Farhi & Javier Castro Albano	November 12, 2021
Despite having achieved Caterina's goal, Allegra senses that she is not actually having a good time due to Cocó's perfectionist behaviour towards her. A label producer seemingly loses interest in the band, to Diego's dismay, after Marco uses a recording of Allegra's to try to spice up the song's vibe, though Allegra feels moved by the attempt. Back in the present, Caterina and Cocó are looking for Allegra, first going to Eleven O'Clock where Caterina and the adult Greta have a tense reunion, still treating each other as enemies when they were about Allegra's age. They return home to find Allegra with Félix. Allegra and Félix again try to defend the former's opportunity to join the company, but Caterina still refuses to listen and shows both of them the video of Allegra, which was supposedly sent by Félix; he claims that he did not send it, but Allegra doesn't believe him and demands to be left alone, Félix having grown jealous of Marco, who in 1994 breaks up with Greta because of her trying to sabotage Caterina and begins spending more time with Allegra. Initially believing he would soon regret it, Greta is nevertheless tipped off by Bárbara about the blossoming closeness between Allegra and Marco, resulting in Greta publicly making a scene, though Caterina comforts Allegra and tells her she is glad that they met. Allegra and Marco kiss.
5	5	"Three Gardenias" "Tres gardenias"	Nicolás Silbert & Leandro Mark	Laura Farhi & Javier Castro Albano	November 12, 2021
Allegra tries to prevent Caterina from giving up Eleven O'Clock to become a writer instead, which she is in the present. She tips Cocó off about a literature workshop she intends to join that coincides with the Freaky Friday tour, much to Caterina's anger. Diego is still upset with Marco for supposedly tampering with the demo until they are contacted by the producer who confirms his interest in recording their demo into a song. Lucía deduces Allegra's real identity when she reveals to have used the bracelet before, implying that there is something Allegra has to resolve in the timeline. Allegra and Marco keep growing closer to each other, even when they open up about the controlling attitudes of their respective parents. Félix and Allegra mend their friendship after Sofía and Alan, Diego's daughter and Félix's older brother, are revealed to have sent the video to Caterina. They felt threatened by Allegra's abilities and conspired together to keep her out of the auditions. She later joins Caterina and Cocó to visit Lucía's grave and mourn her on the 23rd anniversary of her death. As they leave, Allegra stumbles across another grave and is shocked to find out it is Marco's, who apparently died in the same year the musical premiered.
6	6	"Rewind" "Rewind"	Nicolás Silbert & Leandro Mark	Laura Farhi & Javier Castro Albano	November 12, 2021
Allegra and Félix turn to Diego to ask him about Marco. He reveals that during the premiere, back in 1994, a fire burnt the theater to the ground and Marco was the only person who was still inside the building; he hasn't known anything about him ever since, as Marco was nowhere to be found. To keep the musical on track, Cocó covers up Caterina's resignation as a whim of hers, so she temporarily replaces her with Greta during the rehearsals. Caterina tries to warn Allegra that Cocó is not the person she thinks she is. Now that she knows Cocó's ambitious personality is what had a negative impact on Caterina, Allegra goes back to 1994 and tries to make it up to her, throwing her a birthday party at her house, with every of her friends in attendance, and convincing the literature workshop instructor to give Caterina a chance in her writing skills, which he accepts, before being caught by Cocó who orders everyone out of her house and finds out about Caterina and Diego's relationship, even though she wasn't allowed to date anyone from the company. However, Caterina still refuses to talk to Allegra, who is unable to get Cocó to change her mind about letting Caterina follow her true dreams, leading to Allegra finally opening her eyes to so many lies about her. In response, Allegra decides that she will do the lead role in Caterina's place and informs Cocó about it.
7	7	"The Big Leap" "El gran salto"	Nicolás Silbert & Leandro Mark	Laura Farhi & Javier Castro Albano	November 12, 2021
Caterina forgives Allegra for her previous actions and they resume their friendship. Lucía warns Allegra to stay away from Marco since dating people from the past timeline could bring bad consequences. Allegra starts suspecting that the fire at the theater was intentional. Diego and Marco keep clashing over their preferences in recording for the label producer. Franco still disapproves Marco's passion for music. After Caterina resigns from Eleven O'Clock, Cocó gets her a job at an arcade where Greta used to work, but she is nevertheless bored and leaves to do the literature workshop instead. Allegra rehearses hardly for the lead role after Cocó holds new auditions for her and Greta, who tries to sabotage Allegra by deliberately locking her up but is released by Marco. Allegra wins the lead role after Greta fails to do a step of the choreography and falls. Tomás, the owner of the theater and also Bárbara's father, is not comfortable with the fact of Caterina being replaced for the lead role, with Allegra eavesdropping on the conversation with his daughter. Allegra and Félix's friendship wanes after she fails to show up for the shooting of his upcoming short film in favor of a scholarship to enter the film school due to her obsession with Eleven O'Clock. Going to the old theater to find more leads, Allegra runs into an adult Bárbara.
8	8	"Lucía's Secret" "El secreto de Lucía"	Nicolás Silbert & Leandro Mark	Laura Farhi & Javier Castro Albano	November 12, 2021
Bárbara reveals to Allegra and Félix that the old theater was forced to shut down after the fire and her father was blamed for it. She also adds that Greta was jealous of her relationship with Marco that she had sworn revenge against both of them, further reinforcing Allegra's suspicions about Greta. Félix arranges an interview with Greta and, after initially resisting, she confirms her innocence in Marco's death and reveals that Allegra (as Laura in 1994) died the night of the premiere. The adult Diego, Greta's husband, pays a visit to Caterina. Coco's whimsical behaviour meets no boundaries when she imposes an indefinite curfew on Caterina for ditching her arcade job. She also switches the role of Adam and gives it to Diego after noticing Allegra's lack of connection with Marco, which is because Lucía told Allegra about a special yet failed romance she had, named Eusebio, travelling back to 1869 where he ultimately died trying to take him with her, thus serving as a clear example that Allegra's relationship with Marco will not end well. Allegra feels guilty that her distraction cost Marco his role. Taking advantage of the latest change she made, Cocó sends Diego to convince Caterina into rejoining the play and come to the tour. However, Caterina quickly sees through the ruse and breaks up with Diego, demanding that he leave.
9	9	"Just One Day" "Just One day"	Nicolás Silbert & Leandro Mark	Laura Farhi & Javier Castro Albano	November 12, 2021
Allegra intends to make the most of her last travel to save Marco from the fateful fire of the premiere while she encourages Cocó to fix her broken relationship with Caterina, giving her Caterina's unpublished novel she wrote years ago for her to read as a first step. Félix gambles the future of his short film by making a deal when Allegra and Sofía face each other in a dancing duel, which Allegra eventually wins, and she convinces her mother Greta to let her participate for the final audition. The video becomes viral and Caterina is moved by how talented Allegra is. Félix declares his feelings for Allegra before the bracelet transports her to 1994. Marco opens up to Allegra about his father not accepting his true passion and how he has been unable to face him; Allegra advises Marco not to let his father's expectations of him hold him back. Marco also drops out of the band, still upset at Diego for the loss of his lead role. Cocó is unsure about replacing Tomás as the Freaky Friday tour manager with her oldest friend Mike, an important producer and judge of the company in the present, even when Caterina threatened to tell Tomás unless Cocó lifted her curfew. Félix gets in touch with Dante, one of the members of Diego's band, trying to find more leads about the night of the premiere. He notices someone tampering with the security cameras before the fire. Allegra gives the lead role back to Caterina at the last minute and thinks that she had finally managed to change the past.
10	10	"Light Years" "Años luz"	Nicolás Silbert & Leandro Mark	Laura Farhi & Javier Castro Albano	November 12, 2021
Marco's father finally finds out that he has been attending the company behind his back; When Marco refuses to relent, he is disowned as a result. Caterina has a final fight with her mother. Cocó finally gives up and informs Tomás that Caterina will not be part of the tour, but he threatens to sue her for breach of contract if his demands aren't met. The unknown person wearing Cocó's watch sprays perfume on malfunctioning electrical wires that start the fire. Allegra finally catches up to Marco until the bracelet activates and takes her back to the present, but she leaves him behind. Allegra now knows that there was never a 1994 without her and reads a farewell letter from Lucía, which reveals that Eusebio was her husband and Cocó's long-lost father. Allegra later does the final audition, surprisingly attended by her mother Caterina, with an impressive choreography through Marco's finished song. She also reassures Sofía about her abilities not being enough to please Greta, who feels remorseful for having pressured her daughter. Caterina and Cocó reconcile as well, thanks to footage of the night of the premiere of Cocó standing up for her daughter in front of Tomás. Allegra decides not to join the company after all, but she still wants to do musical theater. A few months later, the old theater has reopened its doors where a new play, based on Caterina's novel and starring Allegra and Cocó, became a great success. As the play ends, Allegra and Félix are both shocked when Marco suddenly bursts in, having survived the fire and wearing the same bracelet that brought him to the present.

=== Season 2 (2023) ===
No. overall	No. in season	Title	Directed by	Written by	Original release date
11	1	"Challenge" "Desafío"	Nicolás Silbert & Leandro Mark	Laura Farhi, Jorge Edelstein & Diego Ayala	May 24, 2023
In 1994, Marco escapes from the burning Eleven O'Clock theater. Unwilling to move on from Allegra, he forcefully steals from Lucía the bracelet that takes him to 2021, showing up just as the play "Light Years", presented by the Sharps, comes to an end. (Note: As depicted in the first season finale "Light Years") Allegra insists on helping Marco with his situation, much to Félix's annoyance. Pedro, a producer who has had a history with Cocó, comes up with an interesting offer to present the Sharps' play in Spain. However, Caterina refuses to take it when he wants the script, which she had based on her grandmother's stories, to be entirely modified, but ultimately agrees as long as Cocó convinces Pedro to leave the text faithful to its source material. Desperate to get Marco off his hair, Félix contacts his father Franco, arranging for them to meet at a park. When Marco sees him, he immediately runs away frightened, at which point the bracelet activates, but instead of going back to 1994, it takes him to 1975, where he meets a young Franco, who had a strained relationship with his father, also Marco's grandfather, the owner of a bar, and is shocked to find out that he and Cocó were romantically involved in that timeline.
12	2	"B-Side" "Lado B"	Nicolás Silbert & Leandro Mark	Laura Farhi, Jorge Edelstein & Diego Ayala	May 24, 2023
In 1975, Franco stays pessimistic about saving the bar, as his father intends to sell it. With Marco's help and after hearing him and Cocó sing, Franco has an epiphany and decides to renew and turn the bar into a cafe concert. Despite accomplishing part of his mission, the bracelet's first knot does not untie. Allegra is upset at Félix for forcing the encounter between Marco and his father; he also kicks Marco out of his house, and he temporarily stays at the theater. Cocó is holding auditions for the play and interviews to find someone who can compose the final song, leading Allegra to consider Marco for the job. Félix gives Allegra the song that Marco composed, while she steals the lyrics of Caterina's song. However, by the time he returns the auditions are over and Cocó refuses to give him a chance, but Allegra is hopeful that she will change her mind. She also meets Clara, one of the auditionees, who is oddly familiar with her. Marco believes that he's in 2021 to be with Allegra, who tells him how hard it was for her to move on with her life after thinking that she lost him and doesn't want to go through that again. Marco runs into his father at a dock restaurant.
13	3	"Secret" "Secreto"	Nicolás Silbert & Leandro Mark	Laura Farhi, Jorge Edelstein & Diego Ayala	May 24, 2023
Bárbara and Pedro join forces to prove that Cocó burned down the theater and exonerate Tomás, who was wrongly accused of the crime. After his company goes bankrupt, Franco sells his house and makes plans to leave town as he keeps seeing Marco anywhere he goes, though not before he says goodbye to Diego, who is concerned about him. Marco once again travels to 1975 and arrives at the renewed bar, where he bonds with his mother Paloma, the bartender, and they sing a song she wrote for him when he was a kid; he is confused about why his father never said anything about her after she died. Pedro meets Cocó at the bar and sees potential in her. Meanwhile, Bárbara steals back from Félix the 1994 VHS footage and watches it, thus proving that Cocó did burn the theater. Clara finds out that Marco has been staying at the theater and using another name, but Allegra makes her promise not to tell anyone. They have a bizarre conversation that leaves Allegra suspicious. Marco finally gains the courage to talk to Franco, without revealing his true identity, during which a knot on his bracelet unties. Allegra, Marco, and Félix come across a box that contains a small cat, but as Marco touches it, a light ray activates and surrounds them.
14	4	"The Watch" "El reloj"	Nicolás Silbert & Leandro Mark	Laura Farhi, Jorge Edelstein & Diego Ayala	May 24, 2023
Marcos meets with Franco at the dock, where he opens up to him about Paloma. Meanwhile, in 1975, she professes her feelings for Franco after she finds out that he and Cocó are going to New York without her and gracefully lets him go so he can achieve his dreams. Pedro also secures Cocó a spot for an audition in New York, and is encouraged to go by her grandmother, Allegra. Franco breaks up with Cocó, staying firm on his goal to reopen the bar. Bárbara informs Allegra that she knows her grandmother burned the theater down and is decided to denounce her to the police, but Allegra is skeptical to believe this. Marco goes to the past to retrieve a page of Lucía's diary about her experience with time travelling. Félix makes the shocking discovery that Marco is a time traveller who defied the bracelet and will remain in 2021 forever once he serves his purpose. Said time travellers have twelve days to do so, but Marco only has five days left. Caterina angrily quits from "Light Years" after she sees that the text was changed, despite having been promised it wouldn't be, and berates Cocó for being selfish; Diego and Allegra also quit. Allegra gives Cocó's watch to Bárbara and agrees to help her.
15	5	"The Trip" "El viaje"	Nicolás Silbert & Leandro Mark	Laura Farhi, Jorge Edelstein & Diego Ayala	May 24, 2023
Félix no longer wants to help Marco with his mission out of jealousy for his relationship with Allegra, revealing that he was only doing so to get him back to his timeline as soon as possible. Pedro anonymously leaks the accusations against Cocó to the media, resulting in her being escorted to the police station to give a statement about the theater fire in 1994, the Sharp theater being closed down and the Light Years play indefinitely suspended. Allegra and Caterina watch the news report about the incident in shock. Marco again travels to 1975, where the grand opening of La Gruta takes place, with Franco's father in attendance. However, Cocó, with the support of Lucía and her grandmother, has to leave for New York with Pedro for the audition and tells Franco that she is not coming. Not giving up, Marco encourages Paloma to sing with him on stage, despite her fear of singing in public. After a successful performance, Franco plans on using his earnings to buy an abandoned building and turn it into a cultural space, which never came to be. Back in 2021, Marco goes to Franco for answers, but the bracelet activates, and this time he travels to 1994, where he is met by Diego.
16	6	"Reunion" "Reencuentro"	Nicolás Silbert & Leandro Mark	Laura Farhi, Jorge Edelstein & Diego Ayala	May 24, 2023
Two months after his presumed death in 1994, the Eleven O'Clock members gather at Franco's house to remember Marco on his birthday. Despite being upset at Marco for disappearing, he asks Diego to distract everyone, allowing him to enter his house unnoticed. Franco gives up on carrying out his project and bitterly blames Cocó for his son's death. Diego and Caterina still have feelings for each other, but both are unable to act on them. Greta and Diego find closure after losing Marco and Caterina. Marco finds Mike and Pedro arguing. Pedro blackmails Mike into making him an associate producer for the Freaky Friday tour and angrily admits to burning the theater and framing Cocó, as he felt betrayed when she left him out of the company and became associated with Tomás, who perished in the fire, stating that she became the celebrity she is because of him; Marco records the entire conversation and plays it to Allegra. Allegra thinks that her dreams of being an actress are over, but Félix encourages her to contact the Spain producers. After Caterina firmly refuses to do the play without Cocó, Allegra sends her videos to the producers. Allegra and Caterina apologize to Cocó for accusing her. Cocó tells them that while her actions can be questionable, all she wants is for Allegra to thrive in her passion. Marco finds out that he only has 23 hours left to complete his mission. Félix tries to uncover the junction between the bracelet, the cat and a missing object.
17	7	"Dilemma" "El dilema"	Nicolás Silbert & Leandro Mark	Laura Farhi, Jorge Edelstein & Diego Ayala	May 24, 2023
Marco goes back to 1975 one last time to say goodbye to Paloma, who finishes her song, and they sing it together before Marco departs. Félix reveals to Allegra that he stopped helping Marco and tried to find excuses to spend time with her. Angered and hurt by his betrayal, Allegra ends her friendship with Félix. Pedro is arrested by police for his involvement in the fire, while Allegra meets with the Spain producers. They only agree to attend the Sharps' play as long as Allegra takes them up on their offer for an audition in London. Franco and Marco help the Sharps present Light Years at the same building he intended to buy. However, Clara does not show up, so Caterina begrudgingly agrees to replace her. After the play ends, Marco only has three minutes left as Félix arrives to inform him and Allegra that if he doesn't fulfill his mission, something terrible will happen to his father and when he does, he'll also have to renounce the wish that brought him to 2021. Marco makes the most of the little time he has by singing Paloma's song, dedicating it to his father. A purple vortex starts dragging Marco up, but Allegra decides to join him. Clara suddenly arrives and helps Félix unite the bracelet, the cat, and a necklace she is wearing, but Allegra and Marco vanish. Clara introduces herself to Félix as Allegra's daughter.

== Reception ==
=== Critical response ===
Joel Keller of Decider found Intertwined to be an entertaining drama comedy through its plot, found agreeable that the series focuses more on Carolina Domenech's character and the challenges she faces than the nostalgic atmosphere provided by the 90s, and stated that the characters manage to keep interest in the story of the series. Ashley Moulton of Common Sense Media rated the series 4 out of 5 stars, praised the depiction of positive messages, such as gratitude, and complimented the presence of role models, stating Domenech's character demonstrates perseverance and manages to be responsible, while calling the series fun.

=== Accolades ===
Year	Award	Category	Nominee(s)	Result	Ref.
2022	Produ Awards	Best Youth Children's Series	Intertwined	Nominated	
2022	Produ Awards	Best Child/Youth Lead Actress	Carolina Domenech	Nominated	
2022	Produ Awards	Best Child/Youth Lead Actor	José Giménez Zapiola	Nominated	
2022	Produ Awards	Best Fiction Production - Series and Miniseries	Martín Pla	Nominated	
2022	Produ Awards	Best Vintage Recreation	Matías del Olmo y Juan Rovai	Nominated	
