= Walter Bruno =

Canadian writer

- Born: 30 January 1946 (age 80); Montreal, Quebec, Canada
- Occupations: Writer and translator
- Writing career
- Genre: Theatre

Walter Bruno was born in Montreal, Quebec, Canada. His career as a writer of plays includes three productions, Shouting for Joy and Hand-to-Hand, and, in collaboration, a translation of Alfred Jarry's Ubu the King, all staged in Toronto, Ontario. He was briefly playwright in residence at Toronto Free Theatre.

In 2004, Bruno translated Two English Girls and the Continent (Cambridge Book Review Press), the first translation into English of Deux Anglaises et le Continent by Henri-Pierre Roché (author of Jules and Jim). Two English Girls was the inspiration for François Truffaut's well-regarded adaptation of 1971 (see Two English Girls).

Bruno's poetry has been awarded prizes by Fiddlehead magazine and the Canadian Broadcasting Corporation. In 1996, his imprint, Authors Collective, published Long Shot Odyssey. In 2006, it published Cat Walk and Other Poems.
