= Clara Alonso (actress) =

Argentine actress, singer and TV hostess (born 1991)

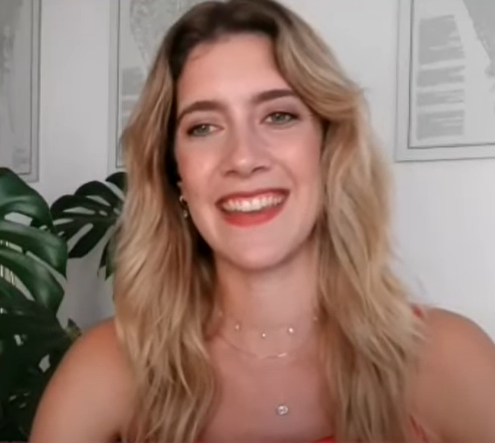
- Alonso in 2021
- Born: María Clara Pancha Alonso; 2 February 1990 (age 36); Rosario, Santa Fe Province, Argentina
- Other name: Clara Alonso
- Occupations: Actress, TV presenter
- Years active: 2007-present
- Website: claraalonso.com.ar

María Clara Pancha Alonso (born 2 February 1990 in Rosario, Santa Fe Province, Argentina), known professionally as Clara Alonso, is an Argentine actress, singer, and television hostess. She debuted as an actress in the 2007 Argentine remake of High School Musical. Since 2007, she has acted in various Disney Channel programs in Latin America. Alonso gained global attention for her lead role as "Angie Carrara" in the 2011 Disney Channel Latin America Series, Violetta.

== Early life ==
María Clara Alonso was born on 2 February 1990 in Rosario, Argentina. Her mother is a paediatrician and pulmonary specialist, and her father is an engineer. Her parents are from Ramallo, a small town in Buenos Aires Province and relocated to Rosario for their university studies as young adults. As a child, she struggled with shyness and perfectionism in school. She described her early childhood in Rosario as being safe and was surrounded by nature, in contrast to the unsafe environment of her later childhood in Buenos Aires. She is the oldest child and has two younger brothers named Agustín and Ignacio. Her younger brother, Agustín, is a jazz pianist, composer, and arranger who lives in Dallas, TX.

At age 2, she and her family moved to Capitán Bermúdez, a smaller city located outside of Rosario. The family later moved to Castelar, a small city near the outskirts of Buenos Aires when she was eight years old due to her father's job. No members of her family are involved in the entertainment industry other than her brother, Agustín. As a child, she practiced gymnastics, swimming, and dance. Alonso played field hockey and volleyball. She attended primary school at Cayetano Errico in Capitán Bermúdez and later graduated high school from Instituto Inmaculada de Castelar in Buenos Aires. She was bullied in school for being an intelligent student. At 8 years old, she quit field hockey and asked her parents to enroll her in musical comedy classes at "Broadway Street", an acting school in Haedo, Buenos Aires. She received lessons in tap, acting, and clown while attending. In addition, she participated in several plays such as Alice in Wonderland at the Astral theater. From 2004 to 2007, she took vocal lessons and studied musical comedy, and acting in Buenos Aires. Among friends and family, she is known as "Clari".

== Acting career ==
=== 2007–2011: Career beginnings ===
One month after completing high school in 2007, Alonso decided to pursue an acting career full-time. She unsuccessfully auditioned for spot in a season of Latin American Idol before later attending castings in 2007 for High School Musical: La Selección. Alonso was one of the twenty people selected to participate in the musical reality competition. The show was broadcast on Channel 13 and on the Disney Channel in Argentina. She was eliminated in the tenth week of competition but was later called back to be a member of a concert tour throughout Argentina. Subsequently, she was also cast in her first acting role as "Clari" in the Argentine film version of High School Musical.

During a tour stop in La Rioja, Argentina for the film's concert, she attracted the attention of Disney Channel Latin America producers who later cast her as a hostess in "Zapping Zone", a youth-targeted celebrity entertainment show for Argentina. She hosted the program alongside Daniel Martins and Carolina Ibarra. Due to the show's success, it began airing in other countries throughout South America.

From 27 April to 2 May 2008, she traveled to Orlando, Florida to participate in the Disney Channel Games 2008. In Latin America, the program aired from September 5 to October 3. She was part of the green team called "The Cyclones", alongside several international Disney stars such as Jason Dolley, Jennifer Stone, Chelsea Staub, Joe Jonas, Brad Kavanagh, Dylan Sprouse and team captain David Henrie. Her team finished in third place with 55 points.

On 21 October 2008, during a taping of "Zapping Zone", Alonso premiered her debut single, "A mi alrededor" with the collaboration of Sophie Oliver Sanchéz. A music video was also filmed and aired throughout Latin America on Disney Channel. This was her first and only solo single for Walt Disney Records' label.

In 2010, she starred in the Disney Channel mini-series Highway: Rodando la Aventura which is the fourth original production of Disney Channel Latin America. The series tells the story of a group of eight friends in a motorhome traveling throughout Latin America. Alonso played a young perfectionist, who was obsessed with cleanliness and order. That same year she began working as a voice-over actress on the Spanish-language version of the Disney Channel series Pecezuelos.

In August 2010, she traveled to São Paulo, Brazil to shoot a two-part episode for the Disney Channel series, "Cuando toca la campana", which is based on the original US version, As the Bell Rings. She played Jennifer, a new student in the final days of the school year. The first part of the episode aired on Disney Channel on 1 December 2011, while the second part of the episode was aired on 8 December 2011. After spending more than four years on "Zapping Zone", Alonso announced her departure from the show on 12 August 2011.

=== 2012–2016: "Violetta" success and international breakout ===
In March 2012, she appeared in an episode in the Disney XD series Latin America show, "Peter Punk", where she played "Piranha", a very determined teenage punk. In late 2011, she was cast as "Angie", the estranged aunt and music teacher of the title character, in the tween musical Disney Channel series, Violetta. Alonso also lent her vocals to several recordings featured on the series first and second seasons. Filming for both seasons occurred in Buenos Aires, Argentina. The show was also filmed additional scenes in Madrid, Spain for the second season. The television series was an international hit and aired in several countries on Disney Channel networks across Europe, Africa, Australia, and New Zealand.

In February 2014, Alonso began rehearsals for the musical theatre production Groupie in Buenos Aires. The play is based on Beatles songs and their cultural and social impact in Buenos Aires in 1963. It premiered at The Cavern in Buenos Aires on 4 June 2014. Alonso played "Sandra" in the production. On 21 March 2014, Alonso confirmed with fans via her official Twitter account that she would continue playing "Angie" for the third season of Violetta.

While on a break from filming Violetta, Alonso visited Italy for the first time and toured Rome. Because of the television show's popularity in Italy, she contacted an Italian acting agency, looking for professional representation. During March and April 2014, she traveled to Milan, Italy, to film Angie e le ricette di Violetta ("Angie and Violetta's recipes" in English), a special cooking v-log mini-series based on Violetta. The role was Alonso's first Italian-speaking part, and the series' first season consisted of 20 episodes. After filming the mini-series, Alonso returned to Argentina to work on the third and final season of Violetta. Angie e le ricette di Violetta premiered on June 9, 2014, on the Disney Channel in Italy. In late November 2014, Violetta concluded production on its third and final season in Buenos Aires. The third season premiered in Argentina on 28 July 2014. The series finale aired on 6 February 2015 in Argentina.

For one week in mid-January 2015, Alonso filmed the second season of Angie e le ricette di Violetta in Milan, Italy. Following the conclusion of production on the series, she revealed to fans via her official Facebook page that the show marked her final project with Disney after an eight-year career with the network.

In June 2015, she shot the Spanish-language short film, Jazmin de invierno ("Jasmine's Winter" in English) in Buenos Aires. A trailer was released in July 2015 on her official YouTube channel. The project is her first post-Disney role and marked a transition in her career from teen-oriented programs to programs for an adult audience. The film was later released on YouTube in late November 2015. In mid-July, she travelled to Rome, Italy to begin filming the web series, Lontana da me ("Far away from me" in English). The web mini series completed filming in early August 2015. On November 17, 2015, the series premiered for streaming on Rai 1's official website. In mid-September 2015, it was revealed that Alonso would take part in the film, Tini, el gran cambio de Violetta, a continuation of the TV series, Violetta. The movie began filming on location in Sicily on 7 October 2015. Additional scenes were filmed in Taormina, Italy, Rome, Madrid, Buenos Aires, and Cádiz, Spain. Filming concluded in mid-December 2015. The film was later released in Europe and Latin America during May 2016. It premiered in Argentina on 2 June 2016.

=== 2017 to 2018 ===
For several days in early February 2017, Alonso filmed the short movie, "Insane Love", directed by Italian filmmaker, Eitan Pitigliani, in Rome, Italy. In late July 2017, she travelled to Rome to begin filming the Italian comedy movie, "Il Tuttofare". Production ended in early September 2017. The film was released in Italy on April 19, 2018. Later that year, Alonso was cast in the Spanish web mini-series, "In the Mood"; the program's first season consisted of four episodes and premiered on YouTube on August 30, 2017.

In early March 2018, Alonso filmed a small role in the Spanish drama movie, "@buelos", in Madrid. The film is expected to be released in Spanish cinemas in November 2018. She was also cast in the Spanish one act play, "La memoria", which ran for 15 minutes showings in Madrid in late April for several days.

In May 2018, it was announced that Alonso had been cast in a role in the upcoming Argentine crime television series, "Campanas en la noche". The show, which is slated to have 80 episodes began production in late May in Buenos Aires and Villa La Angostura. Filming ended in late November 2018. The program will premiere on Telefe in Argentina on 14 January 2019.

=== 2021 to present ===
In 2021, Alonso portrayed the present-day "Caterina Sharp" character in the Disney+ original Entrelazados (Intertwined). The series filmed 2 seasons on location in Buenos Aires between 2021 and 2022. The role marked Alonso's return to Disney Latin America after an eight-year absence. In 2022, she was cast in the Uruguayan drama, Milgona, and later appeared in a small role in the 2024 Spanish-Argentine comedy film, No puedo vivir sin tí. The movie was filmed on location in Bilbao, Spain in 2023. The film was popular upon its August 2024 release on Netflix, obtaining a top 10 placement on the streaming service's platform in Argentina.

In 2025, Alonso announced via her official Instagram account that she had begun rehearsals for the Argentine play, Match 4 Love. The play premiered in Buenos Aires on 12 March 2025, with Alonso cast in one of the two leading roles.

=== Other ventures ===
On 26 January 2015, Alonso was announced as a contestant on third season of the reality competition Notti sul ghiaccio ("Nights on Ice" in English) for the Italian network Rai 1. The competition paired celebrities with professional ice skaters. Alonso trained for the competition in Rome, performing a new routine each week. The season premiered on February 21, 2015, and aired Saturday evenings in Italy on Rai 1. The competition ended on March 21, 2015, where Alonso and her partner, Marco Garavaglia, finished in 3rd place out of 11 contestants.

In October 2016, she and then-boyfriend, Spanish actor Diego Domínguez, were announced as cast members and partners for the Italian dance competition reality show, "Dance, Dance, Dance". The show premiered on Fox Life in Italy on 21 December 2016. It featured contestants recreating dances from popular music videos, musicals, and films. On March 15, 2017, Alonso and Domínguez won first season of "Dance, Dance, Dance".

In a May 2024 interview, she shared with the Argentine magazine, Caras, that she was writing her first screenplay. The screenplay remains unproduced as of 2024.

On 7 March 2025, Alonso's cowritten one-hour play, Un rato de cautela (translated as "A moment of caution" in English), premiered in Buenos Aires. Alonso played one of the lead roles. The production marked her debut as a playwright.

== Personal life ==
At 19, she moved out of her family's home in Castelar to Buenos Aires, and lived on her own for several years. In November 2015, she moved to Madrid, Spain to continue pursuing her acting career. Besides her native Spanish, she speaks English and Italian fluently. In 2013, she began learning Italian in order to work in Italy. In late 2012, she began dating Spanish actor Diego Domínguez, who she co-starred with in Violetta. They ended their relationship in early 2018. She and Domínguez briefly lived together in Madrid from 2015 to late 2017. She moved back to Buenos Aires in May 2018, following her casting in the Argentine TV show, "Campanas de la noche". She holds Argentine and Italian citizenship. Her great-grandparents were from Marche, Italy.

While living and working in Milan and Madrid in 2017, she expressed in an interview with the Italian media that she felt homesickness and struggled with being away from her family in Argentina.

She resides in the Palermo neighbourhood of Buenos Aires. In early 2023, she relocated briefly to Madrid to further her career by enrolling in acting lessons. In 2024, she moved back to Buenos Aires, but frequently travels to Madrid and Milan for work in the European media industry. Alonso is a yoga aficionado and plays guitar. She owns a miniature poodle named Vicente.

She cites The Truman Show as one of her favourite films. She is close friends with Argentine actresses, Candela Vetrano and Cande Molfese. Italian radio host and actress, Lodovica Comello, is also a close friend of hers. Due to the strict morality contract she signed with Disney Latin America while working on Violetta, she was not allowed to be photographed in public drinking alcohol, smoking cigarettes, or behaving inappropriately during the duration of the programme's airing. Alonso stated in the Italian press that she felt a little bit of pressure to be a good role model while working for Disney.

== Filmography ==
=== Films ===
Year	Title	Role	Notes
2008	High School Musical: El Desafio	Clari	High School Musical Argentine version. Debut role.
2008	Tinker Bell	Victoria	Latin American Spanish-language voiceover
2015	Jazmin de invierno	Carolina	Short film
2016	Piuma	Pilar	Italian-language film (Directed by Roan Johnson)
2016	Tini, el gran cambio de Violetta	Angie	Supporting role
2017	Insane Love	Sofia	Short film; Released for streaming in 2020 for Rai Cinema (Italy)
2018	Il Tuttofare	Isabel	Italian-language comedy film
2018	@buelos	Violetta	Spanish-language drama film; Released for streaming in 2020 for Amazon España
2019	La gran aventura de Los Lunnis y el Libro Mágico	Alicia	Children's adventure film; Filmed in Spain
2023	Mientras cupido no está	Catalina	Guest role/Comedy
2023	Milgona	Alejandra	Filmed in Uruguay in 2022
2024	No puedo vivir sin tí	Lucy	Netflix acquired film; co-production from Spain and Argentina

=== Television ===
Year	Title	Role	Notes
2007	High School Musical: La Selección	Herself/Contestant	Reality music competition show
2007–2011	Zapping Zone	Herself	Hostess for Disney Channel Latin America
2008	Disney Channel Games	Herself	The Cyclones/Green Team
2010	Highway: Rodando la aventura	Clari	Lead role, Disney Channel Latin America
2010	XXIV Premios Anuales de la Academia	Herself	Television Hostess
2010–2014	Pecezuelos	Bea (voice)	Spanish-language voiceover
2011	Cuando toca la campana	Olga Jennifer González	1 episode, Disney Channel Latin America
2012	Peter Punk	Yamila ″Piraña″	1 episode, Disney XD Latin America
2012–2015	Violetta	Angie Carrará	Lead role, Disney Channel Latin America
2014–2015	Angie e le ricette di Violetta	Angie Carrará	Lead role, Debut Italian-speaking role. Two seasons; Violetta spin-off mini-series
2015	Notti sul ghiaccio	Herself/Contestant	Italian Reality show competition; 3rd place
2015	Lontana da me	Valeria	Lead role, Italian-language web series for Rai 1
2017	"Dance, Dance, Dance"	Herself/Contestant	Italian Reality competition; Winner
2017	In the Mood	Ana	Spanish-language web mini-series (4 episodes)
2019	Campanas en la noche	Florencia Cervantes	Argentine telenovela (77 episodes)
2021-2023	Entrelazados	Caterina	Supporting role, Disney+ Latin America original series (Seasons 1 and 2)

=== Theatre ===
Year	Production	Role	Notes
2014	Groupie	Sandra	Musical
2018	La memoria		Spanish-language one act play performed in Spain
2025	Match 4 Love	Meli	Comedy Spanish-language play from Argentina

== Discography ==
Singles

- 2008: ″A mi alrededor″

Soundtracks albums

- 2010: Highway: Rodando la aventura

Promotional singles

- ″¡Ven ya!″
- ″Amigas por siempre″
- ″La voz″

=== Tour appearances ===
- 2007: "Actuar, Bailar, Cantar": "High School Musical: La Selección" (Featured singer/dancer)
- 2010: Jonas Brothers Live in Concert World Tour" (Highway: Rodando la aventura opening act for Colombia, Chile, and Argentina)
- 2011: "A Year Without Rain" (Highway: Rodando la aventura opening act for Argentina)
