= Choi Kyu-jin =

Choi Gyu-jin or Choi Kyu-jin (Korean: 최규진) may refer to:

- Choi Gyu-jin (wrestler) (born 1985), South Korean wrestler
- Choi Kyu-jin (actor) (born 1996), South Korean actor
