= List of Running Man episodes (2026) =

- No. of episodes: 44

Release
- Original network: SBS
- Original release: January 4, 2026 – present

Season chronology
- ← Previous; 2025 Next → Season 2027

This is a list of episodes of the South Korean variety show Running Man in 2026. The show airs on SBS as part of their Good Sunday lineup.

== Episodes ==
No. overall	No. for this year	Title	Guest appearance	Missions	Original release date
784 (Note: New Year Special. Special appearance by Sooyoung (Girls' Generation).)	1	"Follow the Horse, Complete the Bingo" (Korean: 말 따라 빙고 정복)	–	Complete the bingo before 3 PM.	January 4, 2026 (Note: Filming on December 22, 2025) (Note: Sooyoung confirmed to the cast members that her drama I Dol I has premiered at the time of the filming of this episode, as she originally want to appear on the show to promote her drama but it didn't happen on time.)
No teams; Mission Accomplished. Through the game of luck, all the members avoided the penalty and received health supplements as a prize.
785	2	"Gold Bag Chasers: Gold Me More" (Korean: 금 가방 추격자: 골드 미 모어)	Apink; Jung Eun-ji; Kim Nam-joo; Oh Ha-young; Park Cho-rong; Yoon Bo-mi	Acquire the real gold briefcase and put it on the judgement stand to win the race.	January 11, 2026
Jae-suk Team: Yoo Jae-suk, Yang Se-chan, Park Cho-rong and Yoon Bo-mi; Haha Team: Haha, Song Ji-hyo, Jung Eun-ji and Oh Ha-young; Jong-kook Team: Kim Jong-kook, Jee Seok-jin, Ji Ye-eun and Kim Nam-joo; The mission was won by Jae-suk Team. They won the real golds as their prize, which Jae-suk would give it to both Park Cho-rong and Yoon Bo-mi. Through the game of luck, Haha, Song Ji-hyo, Ji Ye-eun, Jung Eun-ji, Kim Nam-joo and Oh Ha-young received the ink sponge penalty.
786	3	"The Lucky 2026 OT Day" (Korean: 2026 운수 좋은 OT날)	Kwon Eun-bi	Correctly guess all 5 face balls from the lucky face lottery to win the race.	January 18, 2026
Teams: Draw the Adjective; Jae-suk Team: Yoo Jae-suk, Jee Seok-jin, Haha and Ji Ye-eun; Jong-kook Team: Kim Jong-kook, Song Ji-hyo, Yang Se-chan and Kwon Eun-bi; Neck-and-Neck Dice of Luck; Red Team: Yoo Jae-suk, Kim Jong-kook, Ji Ye-eun and Kwon Eun-bi; Blue Team: Haha, Jee Seok-jin, Song Ji-hyo and Yang Se-chan; The mission was won by Kim Jong-kook and Kwon Eun-bi, after both of them correctly guessed 3 of 5 face balls from the lottery. They received a body cream set as their prize. Haha was exempted from the penalty. Yoo Jae-suk, Jee Seok-jin, Song Ji-hyo, Yang Se-chan and Ji Ye-eun had to make the jewel keychain to avoid bad luck before going home as the penalty.
787	4	"Starting Today, I’m A Nine-Tailed Fox But…" (Korean: 오늘부터 구미호입니다만)	Kim Hye-yoon; Lomon	Have the same amount of 9 tails for the entire race to avoid penalty.	January 25, 2026
No teams; The mission was won by Yoo Jae-suk, Jee Seok-jin, Yang Se-chan, Ji Ye-eun and Kim Hye-yoon. They each received a box of fruit set as their prize, which Jee Seok-jin would give his prize to Lomon. Haha, Kim Jong-kook, Song Ji-hyo, and Lomon had to write a book report about foxes from the fox storybooks and read it before going home as the penalty, which would be released on RM's official YouTube channel. (Note: The penalty explanation along with the penalty segment were cut from the broadcast and were uploaded on their Official Youtube Channel instead.)
788 (Note: TV Rating Notice Special) (Note: Special appearance by Cha Tae-hyun.)	5	"TV Rating Notice Survival" (Korean: 연령고지 생존 서바이벌)	–	Being the last surviving member to have their concept chosen for the new TV Age Rating Notice.	February 1, 2026
No teams; The mission was won by Yoo Jae-suk as the last surviving member through the whipped cream cannon, after choosing Haha's drawing as the final two drawings, with Yoo Jae-suk later deciding to combine his drawing with Haha's drawing for TV Age Rating Notice filming.
789	6	"The Game of Two" (Korean: 2의 게임)	Hong Jin-ho; Mimi (Oh My Girl)	Be chosen by the prize balls to win the race and prize and avoid being chosen by the penalty balls twice to escape penalty.	February 8, 2026
First Team; Jin-ho Team: Hong Jin-ho, Yoo Jae-suk, Kim Jong-kook, Song Ji-hyo and Yang Se-chan; Mimi Team: Mimi, Haha, Jee Seok-jin and Ji Ye-eun; Final Team; Jae-suk Team: Yoo Jae-suk, Haha, Yang Se-chan, Hong Jin-ho and Mimi; Seok-jin Team: Jee Seok-jin, Kim Jong-kook, Song Ji-hyo and Ji Ye-eun; The mission was won by Hong Jin-ho, who got chosen twice by the prize balls and received the Iberico Pork set as his prize. Kim Jong-kook, who got chosen twice by the penalty balls, had to receive two forehead slaps from Hong Jin-ho and PD Lee Myung-jae each as the penalty.
790 (Note: Lunar New Year Special.)	7	"I'm the Main Character Until Lunar New Year" (Korean: 설까지 주인공은 나야나)	Kyuhyun (Super Junior); Roy Kim	Being in the top three as magpies to avoid penalty.	February 15, 2026
No teams; The mission was won by Yoo Jae-suk, who successfully used his defense card on Kyuhyun, along with Kim Jong-kook and Yang Se-chan, who successfully avoided raw egg smash. They received a premium Daebong dried persimmon gift set as their prize. Haha, Jee Seok-jin, Song Ji-hyo, Ji Ye-eun, Kyuhyun, and Roy Kim had to receive a cold water splash from the winners as the penalty.
791 (Note: Jee Seok-jin's Birthday Special.)	8	"The Great Jee-tsby" (Korean: 위대한 지츠비)	–	Celebrate Jee Seok-jin's 60th birthday while collecting big nose coins during the race.	February 22, 2026
No teams; Mission Accomplished. Yoo Jae-suk was exempted from the penalty after he got the exemption card during the race. Jee Seok-jin, who chose himself from the penalty balls, along with Ji Ye-eun, who was chosen by him via penalty balls, had to asked people at the Luminaris Street of Jamsil to make a congratulation video for Jee Seok-jin's 60th birthday and his 16 years on Running Man before going home as the penalty.
792	9	"Card Shark Association: Return of the 2026 Gamblers" (Korean: 타짜협회: 2026꾼들의귀환)	–	Have the most caramel candies to avoid penalty.	March 1, 2026
No teams; The mission was won by Kim Jong-kook. He received the Korean beef set as his prize. Haha and Jee Seok-jin, who went broke after they used all of their caramel candies, had to get their sideburns pulled up by Yang Se-chan as the penalty.
793	10	"Run and Fun Company: Spin the Roomlette" (Korean: 런앤펀 컴퍼니: 룸렛을돌려라)	–	Being chosen by the achievement roulette to win the race while also not getting chosen by the overtime roulette to avoid penalty.	March 8, 2026
Run and Fun Event Company; Director: Jee Seok-jin; General Manager: Yoo Jae-suk; Managers: Haha and Song Ji-hyo; Employees: Yang Se-chan and Ji Ye-eun; There are no Winners. Although Jee Seok-jin got chosen by the achievement roulette and received a box of red ginseng as his prize to win the race, he also somehow got chosen by the overtime roulette as well. Haha, who was chosen by him via overtime roulette had to work overtime alongside Jee Seok-jin by folding the nostalgic paper stars before going home as a penalty.
794	11	"Recharging Your Energy is All About Speed in Spring" (Korean: 활력충전도 스피드인가 봄)	Choi Min-jeong; Lee Jeong-min; Lee June-seo; Noh Do-hee; Shin Dong-min	Have a team with the lowest number of penalty balls to win the race.	March 15, 2026
First Teams; Green Team: Yoo Jae-suk, Jee Seok-jin, Choi Min-jeong and Noh Do-hee; Orange Team: Haha, Ji Ye-eun, Lee Jong-min and Shin Dong-min; Purple Team: Kim Jong-kook, Song Ji-hyo, Yang Se-chan and Lee June-seo; Final Teams; Orange Team: Yoo Jae-suk, Ji Ye-eun, Lee Jong-min and Shin Dong-min; Green Team: Haha, Choi Min-jeong, Lee June-seo and Noh Do-hee; Purple Team: Jee Seok-jin, Kim Jong-kook, Song Ji-hyo and Yang Se-chan; The mission was won by the Green Team, who received the foot spa vouchers as their prize. Jee Seok-jin and Ji Ye-eun, who had the most penalty balls, along with Yoo Jae-suk, who was chosen via penalty balls by Ji Ye-eun, had to drink sophora root tea mixed with Ixeris Dentata as the penalty.
795	12	"Detective Agency: Find the Genuine Piece" (Korean: 탐정사무소: 진품을 찾아라)	Park Shin-yang (Note: Park Shin-yang only participated in the opening race and first mission due to an urge to leave early for his art exhibition.); Lee Chang-sub (BTOB) (Note: Lee Chang-sub and Sung Si-kyung appeared in the second part of Episode 795 and later the entire episode 796.); Sung Si-kyung}	Solve the case by retrieving the missing Park Shin-yang's real painting to win the race.	March 22, 2026
Emotional Animal Farm; Jae-suk Team: Yoo Jae-suk, Haha, Kim Jong-kook and Song Ji-hyo; Se-chan Team: Yang Se-chan, Jee Seok-jin, Ji Ye-eun and Park Shin-yang; Purple Team: Kim Jong-kook, Song Ji-hyo, Yang Se-chan and Lee June-seo; Head Water Transfer; Jae-suk Team: Yoo Jae-suk, Haha, Jee Seok-jin and Yang Se-chan; Jong-kook Team: Kim Jong-kook, Song Ji-hyo and Ji Ye-eun; Dance to Put the Words in Order; No teams; The mission was won by Yang Se-chan, who received a box of quail eggs set as his prize. Yoo Jae-suk, Haha, Jee Seok-jin, Kim Jong-kook, Song Ji-hyo and Ji Ye-eun had to break the wrap frame with their face as the penalty.
796 (Note: The continuation of the second half of episode 795 featuring the second guests.)	13	"You'd Probably Want a Bite" (Korean: 먹고 싶을 텐데)	Park Shin-yang; Lee Chang-sub (BTOB); Sung Si-kyung	Have their name being chosen from food fighter board to win the race.	March 29, 2026
No teams; The mission was won by Haha. He received a basket of premium fruit set as his prize. Kim Jong-kook and Ji Ye-eun, who were chosen by the penalty board, had to eat a lemon as the penalty.
797	14	"War of the Bosses: Ladder of Destiny" (Korean: 짱의 전쟁 : 운명의 사다리)	Jung Soo-jung (f(x)); Jung Woo; Shin Seung-ho	Have their name being chosen as the big boss via octopus leg game to win the race.	April 5, 2026
Knowledge Team: Yoo Jae-suk, Ji Ye-eun and Shin Seung-ho; Physical Team: Kim Jong-kook, Yang Se-chan and Jung Soo-jung; Top Visual Team: Song Ji-hyo, Haha, Jee Seok-jin and Jung Woo; The mission was won by Haha, Ji Ye-eun, Jung Woo and Shin Seung-ho. They receive a bag of snacks as their prize. Through game of luck, Jee Seok-jin, Kim Jong-kook and Song Ji-hyo receive cold water splash as the penalty.
798	15	"The Art of Betting: The Birth of a Gambler" (Korean: 베팅의 정석 -승부사의 탄생-)	Hwasa (Mamamoo); Young K (Day6)	Be on the top three with the most mission funds to win the race.	April 12, 2026
Kim Jong-kook Game; Jae-suk Team: Yoo Jae-suk, Jee Seok-jin, Yang Se-chan, Ji Ye-eun and Hwasa; Jong-kook Team: Kim Jong-kook, Haha, Song Ji-hyo and Young K; Haha Game; Haha Team: Haha, Jee Seok-jin and Ji Ye-eun; Hwasa Team: Hwasa, Kim Jong-kook and Yang Se-chan; Young K Team: Young K, Yoo Jae-suk and Song Ji-hyo; Yoo Jae-suk Game; Jae-suk Team: Yoo Jae-suk, Kim Jong-kook, Yang Se-chan and Hwasa; Seok-jin Team: Jee Seok-jin, Haha, Song Ji-hyo, Ji Ye-eun and Young K; The mission was won by Haha, Jee Seok-jin and Yang Se-chan, who receive their prizes respectively. Hwasa, Kim Jong-kook and Yoo Jae-suk, who were on the 7th, 8th and 9th place respectively, receive their penalty differently.; Prizes: Haha - Korean melon set; Jee Seok-jin - Korean pork set; Yang Se-chan - A box of cup noodles set; Penalty: Hwasa - Face-doodling; Kim Jong-kook - Face-doodling and bald wig; Yoo Jae-suk - Face-doodling, bald wig and gourd breaking
799 (Note: Hong Eun-hee was mentioned at the end of the final mission.)	16	"Running Days: Codename R" (Korean: 런닝데이즈 : 암호명 R)	Park Eun-tae; Shin Sung-rok; Yoo Jun-sang	* Mission Teams' mission: Avoid having a spy on their team to win the race.: Spies' mission: Being on two different teams to win the race.	April 19, 2026
First Teams; Blue Team: Yoo Jae-suk, Jee Seok-jin, Ji Ye-eun and Park Eun-tae; Red Team: Haha, Kim Jong-kook and Shin Sung-rok; Yellow Team: Song Ji-hyo, Yang Se-chan and Yoo Jun-sang; Final Teams; Yellow Team: Yoo Jae-suk, Haha and Shin Sung-rok; Blue Team: Kim Jong-kook, Yang Se-chan, Ji Ye-eun and Park Eun-tae; Red Team: Jee Seok-jin, Song Ji-hyo and Yoo Jun-sang; Spies: Yoo Jae-suk and Yoo Jun-sang; The mission was won by the spies. The spies receive ₩1,034,000 in total and would split the money prize to ₩517,000 each, which Yoo Jun-sang would give his money prize to his wife Hong Eun-hee instead for helping him win the race. Haha and Shin Sung-rok, who had Yoo Jae-suk on their team, along with Jee Seok-jin and Song Ji-hyo, who had Yoo Jun-sang on their team, had to receive flogging penalty.
800 (Note: 800th Episode Special.) (Note: This episode acknowledge Haha's entire 800 episodes' appearances without breaks or time off.)	17	"Infinite Accumulation with Destiny Race" (Korean: 팔자 따라 무한적립 레이스)	–	Choose the button between Up or Down.	April 26, 2026
No teams; There are no winners. They had obtain the total of ₩10,300,000 during the entire race and would donate the money to the ChildFund Korea under Running Man name. Song Ji-hyo and Yang Se-chan, who were chosen via penalty balls, had to write 7 letters that would be included to the 800th Episode's merchandise set before going home as the penalty.
801	18	"Be Different to Walk the Flower Path" (Korean: 색달라야 꽃길)	Chung Ha; Jeon Somi (I.O.I) (Note: Both Chung Ha and Jeon Somi previously appeared as guest separately under their respective solo careers on episode 500 and 514 respectively, with this episode marks their return but under their girl group I.O.I career instead to promote their upcoming 10th anniversary comeback.) (Note: Kim Se-jeong originally was planned to appear on the episode as well but didn't happened due to her schedule.)	Being on the top 3 with the most money to win the race.	May 3, 2026
Jae-suk Team: Yoo Jae-suk, Yang Se-chan, Ji Ye-eun and Chung Ha; Seok-jin Team: Jee Seok-jin, Haha, Kim Jong-kook, Song Ji-hyo and Jeon Somi; The mission was won by Song Ji-hyo, Chung Ha and Jeon Somi, who receive a box of fruit rice cake set as their prize. Ji Ye-eun, who had the least mission money, along with both Haha and Yang Se-chan, who were chosen by the board, receive the rainbow sponge penalty.
802	19	"Gold Thief: Break the Vault" (Korean: 골드 스틸리: 금고를 털어라)	Chae Won-bin; Kim Min-seok; Yoo Hee-kwan	Have a team successfully open the safe to win the race.	May 10, 2026
Jae-suk Team: Yoo Jae-suk, Yang Se-chan and Chae Won-bin; Haha Team: Haha, Ji Ye-eun, Kim Min-seok and Yoo Hee-kwan; Jong-kook Team: Kim Jong-kook, Jee Seok-jin and Song Ji-hyo; The mission was won by Jae-suk Team, who successfully retrieve the gold from the red safe, which Yoo Jae-suk would give all the gold instead to Chae Won-bin. Haha Team, who got a dud from the yellow safe, along with Jong-kook Team, who failed to open the safe, had to chew 10 sweet wormwood pills each per members as the penalty.
803	20	"Secret Payment" (Korean: 은밀한 결제)	Gong Myung	Have the least money on the credit card to win the race.	May 17, 2026
Jae-suk Team: Yoo Jae-suk, Song Ji-hyo, Yang Se-chan and Gong Myung; Seok-jin Team: Jee Seok-jin, Haha, Kim Jong-kook and Ji Ye-eun; The mission was won by Jae-suk Team, with the remaining balance of ₩ 104,000, while Seok-jin Team still had ₩161,000 on the card. Jee Seok-jin was exempted from the penalty. Haha, Kim Jong-kook, Ji Ye-eun, who were on the losing team, along with Yoo Jae-suk, who was chosen via penalty balls by Gong Myung, receive the water splash penalty.
804 (Note: PD Kang Hyung-seon's last episode as main PD.)	21	"Why is Running Man Like That?" (Korean: 런닝맨은 왜 그럴까?)	Ahn Jae-hyun; Kang So-ra	Buy the penalty transfer card to avoid penalty.	May 24, 2026
No teams; Result: There are no winners. Although both Yoo Jae-suk and Haha bought the penalty transfer card each, all members including the guests had agreed to receive the fresh cream bomb without towels penalty together, to avoid wasting the penalty transfer cards that they bought. (Note: This is the first episode of 2026 where all members including guests agree to receive penalty together.); Item Purchased: Yoo Jae-suk: Penalty transfer card and handheld fan; Haha: Penalty transfer card; Jee Seok-jin: Gift certificate and handheld fan; Song Ji-hyo: Gift certificate and handheld fan; Ji Ye-eun: Gift certificate; Kang So-ra: Gift certificate
805 (Note: PD Kim Sol-maro's first episode as main PD.)	22	"I Will Prove It With My Face" (Korean: 얼굴로 증명하겠습니다)	Lee Joo-bin	Have a ID photo with the correct five iconic disguises to win the race.	May 31, 2026
Jae-suk Team: Yoo Jae-suk, Jee Seok-jin, Yang Se-chan and Lee Joo-bin; Jong-kook Team: Kim Jong-kook, Haha, Song Ji-hyo and Ji Ye-eun; The mission was won by Haha, Kim Jong-kook, Song Ji-hyo, Yang Se-chan and Ji Ye-eun. Through the overtime penalty balls that was chosen by Yang Se-chan, Lee Joo-bin had to wear five variety show makeup items and draw a circle beard on the face of three citizens while took a picture with them as overtime penalty before going home.
806	23	"Solo Money Up" (Korean: 나 혼자 머니업)	Jeon So-min; Kim Kyung-nam	Have the most money through the entire race while being on the top three to avoid penalty.	June 7, 2026
No teams; The mission was won by Haha, with the remaining balance of ₩ 1,238,000, followed by Song Ji-hyo, who still had ₩ 1,033,000, and Yoo Jae-suk with ₩ 1,026,000. Kim Jong-kook, Yang Se-chan and Jeon So-min were exempted from the penalty. Through game of luck, Jee Seok-jin and Ji Ye-eun receive the flogging penalty.
807 (Note: Special appearance by Kim Dong-hyun's children: Kim Dan-woo, Kim Yeon-seo and Kim Yeon-woo.)	24	"A Quick Visit to Your Place" (Korean: 너희 집에 살짝 들렀어)	Kim Dong-hyun; Mimi (Oh My Girl)	Avoid being chosen by the babysitting penalty balls.	June 14, 2026
Physical Quiz Battle; Jae-suk Team: Yoo Jae-suk, Haha, Ji Ye-eun and Kim Dong-hyun; Jong-kook Team: Kim Jong-kook, Jee Seok-jin, Song Ji-hyo, Yang Se-chan and Mimi; There are no winners. Through the babysitting penalty balls that were chosen by Kim Dong-hyun's son Kim Dan-woo, Kim Jong-kook and Mimi had to babysit Kim Dong-hyun's children before going home as penalty.
808	25	"Running Man Summer Vacation" (Korean: 런닝맨여름축캉스)	–	Follow the soccer pre-season training and team-building retreat.	June 21, 2026
No teams; There are no winners. Through the game of luck, Haha and Yang Se-chan receive the cold water river penalty.
809	26	"The Invaluable New World" (Korean: 값진 신세계)	Hwang Kwang-hee (ZE:A); Lee Se-hee	Avoid the slaves rank status to win the race.	June 28, 2026
First Rank; Nobles: Haha, Kim Jong-kook, Ji Ye-eun and Hwang Kwang-hee; Slaves: Yoo Jae-suk, Jee Seok-jin, Song Ji-hyo, Yang Se-chan and Lee Se-hee; Final Rank; Nobles: Yoo Jae-suk, Kim Jong-kook, Song Ji-hyo and Lee Se-hee; Slaves: Haha, Jee Seok-jin, Yang Se-chan, Ji Ye-eun and Hwang Kwang-hee; The mission was won by Yoo Jae-suk, Kim Jong-kook, Song Ji-hyo and Lee Se-hee. Haha uses his Penalty Transfer Card to avoid the penalty. Jee Seok-jin, Yang Se-chan, Ji Ye-eun and Hwang Kwang-hee, along with Lee Se-hee, who loses at the Rock-Paper-Scissors game despite being the winner of the race, had to write an apology letter on a 3m long scroll before going home as penalty.
810	27	"A Great Luck Comes to Me" (Korean: 살다 보면 목동 쥐겠지)	Minnie; Miyeon (i-dle)	Eliminate the water ghosts to win the race.	July 5, 2026
Human Team: Yoo Jae-suk, Kim Jong-kook, Song Ji-hyo, Yang Se-chan, Minnie and Miyeon; Water Ghosts: Jee Seok-jin and Ji Ye-eun; Water Ghost Assistant: Haha (Note: Haha pretended to be on Running Man Team while also helping both Jee Seok-jin and Ji Ye-eun.); The mission was won by the Human Team, who successfully eliminated Water Ghosts Jee Seok-jin, Ji Ye-eun, and their assistant Haha. Yang Se-chan and Miyeon, the two last humans standing, received the total money prize of ₩790,000 from their farm work.
811 (Note: 16th Anniversary Special.) (Note: Special appearance via video messages by Cha Tae-hyun, Choi Daniel, Cortis, Heo Nam-jun, Gong Myung, Jeon So-min, Kang Hoon, Kim Dong-hyun, Kim Kyung-nam, Kwon Eun-bi, Kyuhyun (Super Junior), Lee Jun-young, Lee Se-hee, Mimi (Oh My Girl), Miyeon (I-dle), Yoo Yeon-seok)	28	"Holding the Nostalgic Memory's Edge" (Korean: 이 기억의 끝을 잡고)	Jo Hye-ryun; Song Eun-i	Have the most correct authentic items to win the race.	July 12, 2026
Comedy Team: Yoo Jae-suk, Jee Seok-jin, Yang Se-chan, Jo Hye-ryun and Song Eun-i; Variety Team: Kim Jong-kook, Haha, Song Ji-hyo and Ji Ye-eun; The mission was won by Comedy Team. They receive a box of healthy supplements as their prize. Through game of luck, Kim Jong-kook, Song Ji-hyo and Ji Ye-eun, had to do Jo Hye-ryun's Tae Bo diet exercise before going home as a penalty.
812	29	"Yaho Off to Work" (Korean: 출근 야호)	–	Avoid having the filming very earlier or very late to win the race.	July 19, 2026
No teams; There are no winners. As the final result of the filming time that was decided, they would start filming the next week episode at 8:30 AM in the morning.
813	30	"Goal: The Favorite Employee" (Korean: 목표는, 최애 사원)	Cha Woo-min; Kang Hoon; Kim Hye-jun	* Running Man Employees: Have the most gold bars while also successfully capture the gold bar thieves to win the race.: Thieves: Make at least 3 people angry, sabotage the lunch team's mission that was chosen, and get someone to say "you're funny".	July 26, 2026
Running Man Employees: Yoo Jae-suk, Haha, Jee Seok-jin, Kim Jong-kook, Song Ji-hyo, Ji Ye-eun, Cha Woo-min and Kim Hye-jun; Thieves: Yang Se-chan and Kang Hoon; The mission was won by Thieves, after Yang Se-chan fooled everyone through the entire race. Yang Se-chan and Kang Hoon received a Korean pork set each as their prize. Yoo Jae-suk, who successfully guess the thieves, was exempted from the penalty. Haha, Jee Seok-jin, Kim Jong-kook, Song Ji-hyo, Ji Ye-eun, Cha Woo-min, Kim Hye-jun, who failed to guess and capture the thieves, received the water splash penalty.
814 (Note: The secretary works as an undercover for the Detective Team. Also the detective works as an undercover for the Chaebol Team.)	31	"Undercover Chaebol vs. Detectives" (Korean: 언더커버 재벌vs형사)	Ahn Bo-hyun; Jung Eun-chae; Kang Sang-jun; Kim Shin-bi	* Chaebol Team: The chairman needs to escape with the money briefcase.: Detective Team: Identify and arrest the chairman.	August 2, 2026
Chaebol Team; Chairman: Haha; Secretary: Jung Eun-chae; Members: Yoo Jae-suk, Song Ji-hyo, Ahn Bo-hyun and Kang Sang-jun; Detective Team; Detective: Jee Seok-jin; Members: Kim Jong-kook, Yang Se-chan, Ji Ye-eun and Kim Shin-bi; The mission was won by Chaebol Team, who received a seasonal fruit set and the items purchased during the intermediate missions. Detective Team received the whipped cream bomb penalty.
815	32	"Let's All Walk Around Jongno" (Korean: 다 같이 돌자 종로 한 바퀴)	Hong Jin-ho; Kim Ji-yu	Complete the Jongno Marble race to win.	August 9, 2026
Jae-suk Team: Yoo Jae-suk, Yang Se-chan, Ji Ye-eun and Hong Jin-ho; Jong-kook Team: Kim Jong-kook, Haha, Jee Seok-jin, Song Ji-hyo and Kim Ji-yu; The mission was won by Jong-kook Team. Although Jong-kook Team won the race, they did not received prizes because the team never landed on the prize spaces on the marble. Yoo Jae-suk, Yang Se-chan and Hong Jin-ho were chosen by the penalty balls to do the penalties they had landed on the penalty spaces on the marble.; Penalty: Yoo Jae-suk - water slap, drink sophora root tea and water bucket; Yang Se-chan - water slap and water bucket; Hong Jin-ho - drink sophora root tea
816	33	"Scratch-vacation in the Sweltering Heat" (Korean: 무더위 속 깜짝 휴가)	Jung Eun-ji (Apink); Kim Ji-eun; Lee Joo-yeon	Avoid being chosen by the penalty balls.	August 16, 2026
Jae-suk Team: Yoo Jae-suk, Haha, Jee Seok-jin, Kim Ji-eun and Lee Joo-yeon; Jong-kook Team: Kim Jong-kook, Song Ji-hyo, Yang Se-chan, Ji Ye-eun and Jung Eun-ji; The mission was won by Yoo Jae-suk, Haha, Jee Seok-jin, Kim Jong-kook, Song Ji-hyo, Kim Ji-eun and Lee Joo-yeon. Yang Se-chan, Ji Ye-eun and Jung Eun-ji had to write a 1,000-word essay with their feet on the ice bucket as a penalty.
817 (Note: Special appearance by professional darts player Lee Se-hyun.)	34	"Stay Strong Chief Kang!" (Korean: 강부장)	–	Beat Lee Se-hyun in the game of darts to win the prizes for cameraman Kang Chan-hee.	August 23, 2026
No teams; Mission Failed. Although they did not win against Lee Se-hyun, Kang Chan-hee still received a box of wild ginseng, which Haha bought during the bonus round in which he failed, and the director's chair as prizes.
818	35	"Take It or Leave It?" (Korean: 할래? 말래?)	Kim Won-hun; Kwon Eun-bi	Choose between Red or Blue buttons.	August 30, 2026
Take it Team: Yoo Jae-suk, Jee Seok-jin, Yang Se-chan, Ji Ye-eun and Kim Won-hun; Leave it Team: Haha, Kim Jong-kook, Song Ji-hyo and Kwon Eun-bi; The mission was won by Yoo Jae-suk, Jee Seok-jin and Song Ji-hyo. Through game of luck, Haha, Kim Jong-kook, Yang Se-chan and Ji Ye-eun, had to do ink face paint penalty.
819 (Note: Lee Joo-yeon's career as member of After School was mentioned in this episode, along with several archive footages of her fellow former members of the group.) (Note: Former leader of After School group Kahi was mentioned in this episode.) (Note: The announcement of Ji Ye-eun's upcoming marriage with Dancer Vata was indirectly mentioned by the production staff via subtitle.)	36	"Irrefutable Artificial Intelligence 'Pick'" (Korean: 반박불가 인공지능 '픽')	Heo Kyung-hwan; Lee Joo-yeon; Miyeon (i-dle)	Avoid being chosen by AI to do the penalty.	September 6, 2026
Superstar AI Contest; Jae-suk Team: Yoo Jae-suk, Jee Seok-jin, Ji Ye-eun, Heo Kyung-hwan and Miyeon; Jong-kook Team: Kim Jong-kook, Haha, Song Ji-hyo, Yang Se-chan and Lee Joo-yeon; Typing Empty Heads; No teams; The mission was won by Haha, Jee Seok-jin, Song Ji-hyo, Heo Kyung-hwan, Lee Joo-yeon and Miyeon. Haha and Heo Kyung-hwan were picked to choose via AI on who would get the penalty. Yoo Jae-suk, Kim Jong-kook, Yang Se-chan and Ji Ye-eun had to create ten different TV Rating notice using AI before going home as penalty.
820 (Note: Ji Ye-eun announced her upcoming marriage on this episode.)	37	"There's an Outsiders in Here, Grand Duke" (Korean: 대공님, 이 안에 외지인이 있습니다)	Han Ji-eun; San (ATEEZ)	Catch the outsiders.	September 13, 2026
Grand Dukes: Haha, Yang Se-chan and San; Townspeople: Yoo Jae-suk, Jee Seok-jin, Song Ji-hyo and Ji Ye-eun; Outsiders: Kim Jong-kook and Han Ji-eun (Note: Han Ji-eun pretended as the Grand Duchess, while Kim Jong-kook pretended to be part of Townspeople.); Main Teams: North Team: San, Yoo Jae-suk and Ji Ye-eun; Fool Team: Haha, Jee Seok-jin and Han Ji-eun; Belly Team: Yang Se-chan, Kim Jong-kook and Song Ji-hyo; The mission was won by Outsiders. Kim Jong-kook and Han Ji-eun each received the ₩300,000 gift certificates. The Grand Dukes, along with Yoo Jae-suk, who was chosen by them, receive the flogging penalty.
821	38	"Tearing Up at Cheolwon" (Korean: 철원 뜯어 뿌쓰요)	Heo Kyung-hwan	Complete the bingo board to avoid penalty.	October 4, 2026 (Note: This episode will air after 2-week break due to the coverage of 2026 Asian Games.)
Pick Up First to Survive; Yellow Team: Yoo Jae-suk, Jee Seok-jin, Ji Ye-eun and Heo Kyung-hwan; Green Team: Haha, Kim Jong-kook, Song Ji-hyo and Yang Se-chan; This mission was won by Green Team. Jee Seok-jin was exempted from the penalty. Yoo Jae-suk, Ji Ye-eun and Heo Kyung-hwan, had to ride a train around Goseokjeong flower field and make a promotional video for it.
822	39	"Tearing Up at Cheolwon II" (Korean: 철원 뜯어 뿌쓰요 II)	Heo Kyung-hwan	* Final Main Mission: Avoid having their alarms went off either first or last to win the race.: Morning Mission: Being on top 4 to avoid being chosen to cook breakfast.	October 11, 2026
No teams; Final Main Mission Result: The mission was won by Jee Seok-jin, Haha, Song Ji-Hyo and Ji Ye-eun. Yoo Jae-suk, Kim Jong-kook, Yang Se-chan and Heo Kyung-hwan, had to see a night view from Torch Observatory as their penalty.; Morning Mission Result: The mission was won by Yoo Jae-suk, Haha, Kim Jong-kook and Yang Se-chan. Jee Seok-jin, Song Ji-hyo, Ji Ye-eun and Heo kyung-hwan, had to cook Janchi guksu for breakfast as their penalty.
823 (Note: Son Na-eun was mentioned in this episode over 4 years since last mention on episode 500.)	40	"The EXchange Arrows" (Korean: 환송의 작대기)	Chorong (Apink); Yura (Girl's Day)	Avoid having the most penalty balls to win the race.	October 18, 2026
Captains: Chorong and Yura; Players: Yoo Jae-suk, Haha, Jee Seok-jin, Kim Jong-kook, Song Ji-hyo, Yang Se-chan and Ji Ye-eun; There are no Winners. Yang Se-Chan and Chorong received one movie ticket each after both of them choose each other as couple at the end of the race. Yang Se-chan, who has the least penalty balls, was exempted from the penalty. Via the penalty balls that were chosen, Chorong, who choose herself, along with Yoo Jae-suk (who was chosen by Jee Seok-jin) and Kim Jong-kook (who was chosen by Yura), had to make the mini turtle keychains for all members who would be given the keychains on the next filming.
824	41	"Corporate Card's Whereabouts" (Korean: 별카 어딧세이)	–	Avoid being the last person to pay everything.	October 25, 2026
No teams; There are no winners. The final payment total is 758,000 ₩, with other members only paid 74,200 ₩. Jee Seok-jin, who was the only person who didn't found his card, had to paid the remaining payment.
825	42	"The Medalist Showdown" (Korean: 메달까지 난리자베스)	Lee Hyun-jung; Kim Min-jong	Guess the race's secret.	November 1, 2026
Jae-suk Team: Yoo Jae-suk, Jee Seok-jin and Lee Hyun-jung; Haha Team: Haha, Song Ji-hyo and Ji Ye-eun; Jong-kook Team: Kim Jong-kook, Yang Se-chan and Kim Min-jong; The mission was won by Jae-suk Team, who revealed the race's secret by using the foot size of either Lee Hyun-jung or Kim Min-jong as their weight scaling method. They receive a gold medal and a teddy bear doll each as their prize, which they gave their teddy bear dolls to Kim Min-jong instead. Haha Team and Jong-kook Team received the water slap penalty.
826	43	"Good Battle" (Korean: 뜨거운 승부)	Kang Hoon; Lee E-dam	Have the most R Coins that were got from the entire race to buy both penalty and prize slots on the roulettes.	November 8, 2026
Short Kkeu-kkeu Dance Club: Yoo Jae-suk, Haha and Yang Se-chan; Running Club: Jee Seok-jin, Kim Jong-kook, Song Ji-hyo and Ji Ye-eun; Asura Comedy Club: Kang Hoon and Lee E-dam; Red Team: Yoo Jae-suk, Jee Seok-jin, Song Ji-hyo and Ji Ye-eun; Blue Team: Haha, Kim Jong-kook, Yang Se-chan, Kang Hoon and Lee E-dam; There are no winners. Either teams unable to win the prizes from the Prize Roulette, while Red Team was chosen by the penalty roulette. Yoo Jae-suk, who was originally exempted from the penalty with 4 R Coins left, voluntarily took Jee Seok-jin's penalty spot, along with Song Ji-hyo and Ji Ye-eun, receiving the water bomb penalty.
827	44	"To be Continued Autumn" (Korean: 가을 투비컨티뉴드)	Kyuhyun; (Super Junior)	Collect the mission funds in order to buy hints from the production team to visit two famous photo spots while avoiding penalty.	November 15, 2026
1st Photo shot location; Team Suk Brothers: Yoo Jae-suk and Jee Seok-jin; Team 401: Haha and Kim jong-kook; Team Meokjjang Sisters: Song Ji-hyo and Ji Ye-eun; Team Antenna: Yang Se-chan and Kyuhun; There are no winners. Since their final mission funds was 160 dollars, 6 people would receive the penalty. Through the pirate roulette, Yoo Jae-suk and Song ji-hyo, who were exempted fron the penalty, receive a premium korean pork gift set each as their prize, while Haha, Jee Seok-jin, Kim Jong-kook, Yang se-chan, Ji Ye-eun and Kyuhyun receive the fresh cream bomb penalty.

== Upcoming episode ==
No. overall	No. for this year	Title	Guest appearance	Teams	Missions	Original release date
828 (Note: The behind the scenes filming of episode 828 was featured on SBS's My Genie Secretary Episode 11 where Kim Jong-kook will appear as guest.)	45	"The Youngs' Shuffle" (Korean: 영영구구)	Joo Hyun-young; Kang Ki-young	TBA	TBA	November 22, 2026

== Viewership ==
Running Man : South Korea viewers per episode (thousands)

Episodes (2026)	Episode number													
Episodes (2026)	1	2	3	4	5	6	7	8	9	10	11	12	13	14
784-797	903	866	824	869	866	925	606	745	714	777	745	724	853	639
798-811	861	639	766	728	689	704	556	587	652	634	716	641	812	654
812-825	717	594	682	752	679	816	688	555	393	638	772	738	942	852
826-839	720	TBD	TBD	TBD	TBD	TBD	TBD	TBD	TBD	TBD	TBD	TBD	TBD	TBD

Source: Audience measurement performed nationwide by Nielsen Media Research.

Average TV viewership ratings
Ep.	Original broadcast date	Nielsen Korea	
Ep.	Original broadcast date	Nationwide	Seoul
784	January 4, 2026	3.9% (12th)	4.3% (11th)
785	January 11, 2026	3.5% (13th)	3.9% (12th)
786	January 18, 2026	3.5% (13th)	3.6% (13th)
787	January 25, 2026	3.7% (13th)	4.2% (12th)
788	February 1, 2026	3.7% (13th)	4.2% (13th)
789	February 8, 2026	4.0% (11th)	4.6% (8th)
790	February 15, 2026	2.8% (20th)	3.3% (10th)
791	February 22, 2026	3.6% (12th)	3.3% (10th)
792	March 1, 2026	3.0% (16th)	3.3% (9th)
793	March 8, 2026	3.5% (17th)	3.8% (13th)
794	March 15, 2026	3.4% (10th)	3.8% (10th)
795	March 22, 2026	3.1% (14th)	3.6% (10th)
796	March 29, 2026	3.7% (11th)	4.2% (8th)
797	April 5, 2026	2.8% (17th)	2.9% (13th)
798	April 12, 2026	3.7% (10th)	4.1% (8th)
799	April 19, 2026	3.0% (14th)	3.2% (9th)
800	April 26, 2026	3.7% (10th)	4.1% (8th)
801	May 3, 2026	3.0% (15th)	3.4% (10th)
802	May 10, 2026	3.1% (15th)	3.6% (10th)
803	May 17, 2026	3.1% (13th)	3.1% (10th)
804	May 24, 2026	2.6% (15th)	2.8% (11th)
805	May 31, 2026	2.8% (15th)	3.4% (10th)
806	June 7, 2026	2.6% (19th)	2.8% (13th)
807	June 14, 2026	2.7% (17th)	2.9% (14th)
808	June 21, 2026	3.3% (11th)	3.6% (8th)
809	June 28, 2026	2.6% (17th)	3.0% (10th)
810	July 5, 2026	3.3% (11th)	3.7% (9th)
811	July 12, 2026	2.7% (17th)	3.0% (16th)
812	July 19, 2026	3.2% (11th)	3.5% (9th)
813	July 26, 2026	2.6% (N/A)	2.9% (15th)
814	August 2, 2026	2.8% (15th)	3.0% (14th)
815	August 9, 2026	3.0% (15th)	2.9% (15th)
816	August 16, 2026	3.0% (15th)	3.0% (12th)
817	August 23, 2026	3.7% (10th)	4.0% (8th)
818	August 30, 2026	3.7% (10th)	3.2% (15th)
819	September 6, 2026	2.5% (15th)	2.6% (16th)
820	September 13, 2026	N/A	2.1% (17th)
821	October 4, 2026	3.0% (12th)	3.6% (8th)
822	October 11, 2026	3.4% (16th)	3.7% (10th)
823	October 18, 2026	3.3% (16th)	3.4% (15th)
824	October 25, 2026	3.8% (13th)	3.7% (10th)
825	November 1, 2026	3.8% (14th)	4.1% (10th)
826	November 8, 2026	3.0% (19th)	3.1% (14th)
N/A denotes episode didn't enter top 20 in Nielsen Korea and TNmS ratings.
