= Connect (TV series) =

2022 South Korean television series

- Promotional poster
- Hangul: 커넥트
- RR: Keonekteu
- MR: K'ŏnekt'ŭ
- Genre: Horror; Mystery; Psychological thriller; Science fantasy
- Based on: Connect by Shin Dae-sung
- Developed by: Studio Dragon (planning)
- Screenplay by: Masaru Nakamura; Ha-dam
- Directed by: Takashi Miike
- Starring: Jung Hae-in; Go Kyung-pyo; Kim Hye-jun
- Music by: Sim Hyeon-jeong
- Country of origin: South Korea
- Original language: Korean
- No. of episodes: 6

Production
- Executive producers: Jang Jeong-do; Lee Jae-hyung (CP); Kwon Mi-ji (CP); Saka misako (CP)
- Producer: Choi Yeon-ho
- Cinematography: Kim Ji-yong; Kim Sung-jin
- Editor: Sagara Naoichiro
- Running time: 40 minutes
- Production companies: Studio Dragon; Lee'z Film; Studio HIM

Original release
- Network: Disney+
- Release: December 7, 2022

Connect (Korean: 커넥트) is a South Korean television series directed by Takashi Miike, starring Jung Hae-in, Go Kyung-pyo, and Kim Hye-jun. Based on a webtoon of the same name, the series depicts a mysterious story that occurs when a man who has been deprived of a part of his body by organ hunters connects with a person who has received an organ transplant. It premiered on Disney+ on December 7, 2022.

== Synopsis ==
A new human being type, Connect, whose body repairs itself, is kidnapped by an organ trafficking organization. Part way through the organ harvesting surgery, he suddenly wakes up on an operating table and manages to escape, but he is missing one of his eyes. Then he finds out that he can "see" through his missing eye, which has now been transplanted into a serial killer who is turning his victims into corpse art. Determined to get back what was, Ha Dong-soo (Jung Hae-in) pursues the killer to make himself whole again.

== Cast ==
=== Main ===
- Jung Hae-in as Ha Dong-soo

an immortal humanoid who lost one eye

- Go Kyung-pyo as Oh Jin-seop

a serial killer who received an eye transplant from Connect

- Kim Hye-jun as Choi I-rang

a mysterious helper who knows the secret of Connect

=== Supporting ===
==== Police ====
- Kim Roi-ha as Detective Choi
- Han Tae-hee as Detective Yeom
- Lee Tae-hyeong as Detective Park

==== Organ Trafficking Gang ====
- Jang Gwang as doctor
- Jo Bok-rae as Mr. Kim
- Sung Hyuk as Min-sook

==== Other ====
- Jang Hee-ryung as Lee Sun hee
- Yang Dong-geun as musician Z
- Oh Ha-nee as Song Ha-young

== Production ==
In June 2021, Studio Dragon announced that they were preparing to produce a new drama titled Connect with Japanese director Takashi Miike. The series is the first South Korean drama to be directed by a Japanese director.

In January 2022, it was reported that filming of the series was in progress. Filming reportedly ended in March 2022.

== Release ==
The series premiered at 27th Busan International Film Festival in "Onscreen Section" on October 6, 2022, where the first three episodes were screened.

All the 6 episodes of Connect were released on December 7, 2022, on Disney+.

== Episode list ==
Episode list
| Ep. | Korean title | English title | Duration |
|---|---|---|---|
| 1 | "접속" | "Connection" | 47 minutes |
| 2 | "결합" | "Conjunction" | 43 minutes |
| 3 | "작곡" | "Composition" | 43 minutes |
| 4 | "자백" | "Confession" | 45 minutes |
| 5 | "조작" | "Concoction" | 37 minutes |
| 6 | "혼란" | "Confusion" | 42 minutes |

== Reception ==
Review aggregator Rotten Tomatoes reported an approval rating of 100% based on 6 critic reviews, with an average rating of 7.2/10.
