= A Shop for Killers =

2024 South Korean television series

- Hangul: 킬러들의 쇼핑몰
- Lit.: The Killers' Shopping Mall
- RR: Killeodeurui syopingmol
- MR: K'illŏdŭrŭi syop'ingmol
- Genre: Action drama
- Created by: Kwon Lee; E. Oni
- Based on: A Killer's Shopping Mall by Kang Ji-young
- Screenplay by: Jee Ho-jin; Kwon Lee
- Directed by: Kwon Lee; Noh Kyu-yeob
- Starring: Lee Dong-wook; Kim Hye-jun
- Music by: Primary
- Country of origin: South Korea
- Original language: Korean
- No. of seasons: 2
- No. of episodes: 16

Production
- Executive producers: You Jeong-hun; Jung Geun-wook; Kang In; Seo Kyung-joon; Kim In-ae; Lee Sung-hoon
- Producers: Cha Sang-min; Kim Kyung-jae; Lim Ra-kyung
- Cinematography: Lee Sung-jae; Kim Gi-hyun; Kim Hyung-sub
- Editors: Choi Jae-geun; Lee Kang-hee
- Running time: 44–62 minutes
- Production companies: Merrychristmas; Project Onion

Original release
- Network: Disney+ (Hulu content hub)
- Release: January 17, 2024 – August 12, 2026

Related
- The Killer's Shopping List

A Shop for Killers (Korean: 킬러들의 쇼핑몰) is a 2024 South Korean action drama television series co-created, co-written and co-directed by Lee Kwon, and starring Lee Dong-wook and Kim Hye-jun. Based on the novel A Killer's Shopping Mall by Kang Ji-young, the story is about a girl who lost her parents and grew up in the hands of her uncle who runs a suspicious online shop. The first season was released on Disney+ from January 17 to February 7, 2024. The second season was premiered on July 22, 2026.

The series received generally positive reviews, with critics praising the action sequences and character dynamics, though some noted issues with pacing and narrative logic.

== Plot ==
=== Season 1 ===
Jeong Ji-an is a college student raised by her mysterious uncle, Jeong Jin-man, after the violent deaths of her parents. Jin-man, who operated an online "agricultural equipment" warehouse called Murthehelp, raised Ji-an with unconventional survival training, including combat skills and marksmanship, under the guise of eccentric hobbies.

The story begins in the present when Ji-an receives news of her uncle's apparent suicide. Upon returning home, she is suddenly targeted by highly skilled assassins. She discovers that Murthehelp was actually a sophisticated dark web marketplace for illegal weapons and supplies used by a global criminal community.

The narrative utilizes flashbacks to reveal Jin-man's past as a legendary mercenary for a private military company called Babylon. During his service, Jin-man clashed with the psychopathic Bale, leading to a blood feud that resulted in the massacre of Jin-man's family and forced him into hiding to protect Ji-an.

Back in the present, Ji-an must utilize the codes of the shopping mall and the assistance of Jin-man's former allies, including the Muay Thai master Pasin, the elite assassin So Min-hye, and the mall's hidden underground manager, Brother, to defend the warehouse. Ji-an eventually embraces her role as the new head of Murthehelp, successfully fending off the breach and defeating the primary antagonists.

The series concludes with the revelation that Jin-man faked his death as part of a strategic move to eliminate his enemies and test Ji-an's capabilities. As the conflict ends, a battered Jin-man returns to the warehouse to reunite with Ji-an.

=== Season 2 ===
Jin-man continues to be targeted by Babylon, who are now joined by the company's Japan Division, led by Kusanagi. Jin-man and Ji-an decide to launch an all-out counterattack on Babylon.

== Cast and characters ==
=== Main ===
- Lee Dong-wook as Jeong Jin-man

A man who secretly runs an unusual shopping mall called Murthehelp and has been raising his niece, Ji-an.

- Kim Hye-jun as Jeong Ji-an
  - Ahn Se-bin as child Jeong Ji-an
  - Cho Si-yeon as 13-year-old Jeong Ji-an

A young lady who grew up with her unusual uncle after losing her parents.

=== Supporting ===
- Seo Hyun-woo as Lee Seong-jo

A cold-blooded, top notch sniper.

- Jo Han-sun as Bale

A notorious villain who is feared by other killers.

- Park Ji-bin as Bae Jeong-min
  - Kim Ye-gyeom as child Jeong-min

Ji-an's classmate who uncovers the identity of the shopping mall with his excellent hacking skills.

- Geum Hae-na as So Min-hye

An S-class killer who specializes in guns, knives and bare-knuckle fighting.

- Lee Tae-young as Brother
  - Kim Se-heon as child Brother

A suspicious part-timer who has been managing the shopping mall with full of secrets without anyone knowing.

- Kim Min as Pasin

Ji-an's Muay Thai teacher and Jin-man's longtime colleague.

=== Others ===
- Ahn Gil-kang as Lee Yong-han

The leader of Babylon, a mercenary organization.

- Park Jeong-woo as Honda

A mute who is Jin-man's colleague and Brother's older brother.

- Jung Yi-hun as Jun-cheol

A member of the mercenary team who trusts and follows Jin-man.

- Kim Jun-bae as Mr. Kim

A killer who has been through many hardships.

- Han Chul-woo as Ji-an's father
- Song Ah-kyung as Ji-an's mother
- Hwang Dong-hyun as Kuma

A member of the mercenary team hired by Seong-jo.

- Kang Hee-se and Kang Hee-je as the twin killers.
- Park Sang-won as Kim Seong-hwan

A new mercenary for Babylon.

- Hwang Dae-ki as Bongo

=== Special appearances ===
==== Season 1 ====
- Cha Mi-kyung as Ji-an's grandmother
- Kim Han-jong as a taxi driver
- Kim Yoon-sung as Detective Park
- Cho Ji-an as Jun-myeon

==== Season 2 ====
- Ha Do-kwon as Team Leader Jo
- Yoo Ji-tae as Chen

== Episodes ==
Season	Episodes	Originally released		
Season	Episodes	First released	Last released	Network
1	8	January 17, 2024	February 7, 2024	Disney+
2	8	July 22, 2026	August 12, 2026	Hulu

=== Season 1 ===
No. overall	No. in season	Title	Directed by	Screenplay by	Original release date
1	1	"Murthehelp"; Transliteration: "Meodeohelpeu" (Korean: 머더헬프)	Kwon Lee and Noh Kyu-yeob	Jee Ho-jin and Kwon Lee	January 17, 2024
2	2	"Jeong Jinman, Jeong Jinman, Jeong Jinman"; Transliteration: "Jeong Jin-man, Jeong Jin-man, Jeong Jin-man" (Korean: 정진만, 정진만, 정진만)	Kwon Lee and Noh Kyu-yeob	Jee Ho-jin and Kwon Lee	January 17, 2024
3	3	"The Strong Don't Howl"; Transliteration: "Ganghamyeon jijji anha" (Korean: 강하면 짖지 않아)	Kwon Lee and Noh Kyu-yeob	Jee Ho-jin and Kwon Lee	January 24, 2024
4	4	"The Shopping Mall"; Transliteration: "Syopingmol" (Korean: 쇼핑몰)	Kwon Lee and Noh Kyu-yeob	Jee Ho-jin and Kwon Lee	January 24, 2024
5	5	"Babylon"; Transliteration: "Babilon" (Korean: 바빌론)	Kwon Lee and Noh Kyu-yeob	Jee Ho-jin and Kwon Lee	January 31, 2024
6	6	"Jeong Jinman"; Transliteration: "Jeong Jin-man" (Korean: 정진만)	Kwon Lee and Noh Kyu-yeob	Jee Ho-jin and Kwon Lee	January 31, 2024
7	7	"Trap"; Transliteration: "Hamjeong" (Korean: 함정)	Kwon Lee and Noh Kyu-yeob	Jee Ho-jin and Kwon Lee	February 7, 2024
8	8	"Listen Up, Jian"; Transliteration: "Jal deureo, Jeong Ji-an" (Korean: 잘 들어, 정지안)	Kwon Lee and Noh Kyu-yeob	Jee Ho-jin and Kwon Lee	February 7, 2024

=== Season 2 ===
No. overall	No. in season	Title	Directed by	Screenplay by	Original release date
9	1	"Jinman, That Same Day"; Transliteration: "Geunarui Jeong Jin-man" (Korean: 그날의 정진만)	Kwon Lee	Jee Ho-jin and Kwon Lee	July 22, 2026
10	2	"Recluse"; Transliteration: "Eundunja" (Korean: 은둔자)	Kwon Lee	Jee Ho-jin and Kwon Lee	July 22, 2026
11	3	"Past Is Past, Present Is Present"; Transliteration: "Gwageoneun gwageo, jigeumeun jigeum" (Korean: 과거는 과거, 지금은 지금)	Kwon Lee	Jee Ho-jin and Kwon Lee	July 29, 2026
12	4	"Raid"; Transliteration: "Giseup" (Korean: 기습)	Kwon Lee	Jee Ho-jin and Kwon Lee	July 29, 2026
13	5	"Negotiation"; Transliteration: "Hyeopsang" (Korean: 협상)	Kwon Lee	Jee Ho-jin and Kwon Lee	August 5, 2026
14	6	"The Trojan Horse"; Transliteration: "Teuroi mokma" (Korean: 트로이 목마)	Kwon Lee	Jee Ho-jin and Kwon Lee	August 5, 2026
15	7	"The Enemy of My Enemy"; Transliteration: "Jeokui jeok" (Korean: 적의 적)	Kwon Lee	Jee Ho-jin and Kwon Lee	August 12, 2026
16	8	"Listen Up, Jinman"; Transliteration: "Jaldeureo, Jeong Jin-man" (Korean: 잘들어, 정진만)	Kwon Lee	Jee Ho-jin and Kwon Lee	August 12, 2026

== Production ==
=== Development ===
A Shop for Killers is co-directed by Lee Kwon and Noh Kyu-yeop, co-written by Ji Ho-jin and Lee, co-produced by Merrychristmas and Project Onion, and provided by The Walt Disney Company Korea.

In February 2024, director Lee said in an interview that they were closely discussing the possibility to produce a second season. Ten months later, Disney+ confirmed the production of the series' second season.

=== Casting ===
In November 2022, Lee Dong-wook and Kim Hye-jun were reportedly cast for the series. Lee and Kim were announced in the lead roles in May 2023. In December 2023, Seo Hyun-woo, Jo Han-sun, Park Ji-bin, Geum Hae-na, and Kim Min were revealed to play various roles in the series.

In April 2025, Lee and Kim were confirmed to return for the second season with most of the original cast members. New cast members Masaki Oda, Hyunri, and Jung Yun-ha were also announced to join.

=== Filming ===
Principal photography for the first season took place between January and June 2023. The second season's principal photography began in April 2025.

== Original soundtrack ==
A Shop For Killers (Original Soundtrack)

Soundtrack album by Primary
- Released: February 16, 2024
- Length: 1:46:58
- Language: Korean
- Labels: Universal Music; Hollywood Records

Singles from A Shop For Killers (Original Soundtrack)
- 1. "How Can I Be Late" Released: February 16, 2024

On January 26, 2024, it was announced that music director Primary participated for the scoring of A Shop for Killers. In addition, Primary said that he used instruments that can highlight each character's unique charm in the right place. To express the rough and complete appearance of Jin-man, he used masculine guitar sounds, then for Ji-an, who is not yet fully mature, he used an analog synthesizer to bring out an unrefined feeling, and lastly for Bale, the villain of the series, emphasized the character's extremely evil appearance with the dull tone of the cello.

The soundtrack album of A Shop for Killers was released on February 16, 2024; it contains all of the singles and background tracks from the series.

A Shop for Killers track listing
No.	Title	Lyrics	Music	Artist	Length
1.	"How Can I Be Late"	Benzamin; Genesio	Benzamin; Genesio	Primary; Benzamin; Genesio	4:17
2.	"Memory One"		Primary		1:40
3.	"Blind Spot"		Primary		2:31
4.	"Strangers"		Primary; Genosio		1:40
5.	"Funeral"		Primary; 1of1		0:52
6.	"Threat"		Primary; Genesio		1:29
7.	"Warm Memory"		Primary; Idoo		2:04
8.	"Child Memory"		Primary		1:32
9.	"Who"		Primary		3:06
10.	"Hyena"		Primary		1:16
11.	"Run in Hospital"		Primary		4:18
12.	"Young Jiahn"		Primary		1:42
13.	"Dark Website"		Primary		2:09
14.	"Drone Attack"		Primary		4:24
15.	"Murthehelp"		Primary		2:35
16.	"His Plan"		Primary; Genesio		1:01
17.	"Again Attack"		Primary		1:22
18.	"Jiahn"		Primary		2:36
19.	"Minhye in Warehouse"		Primary		2:19
20.	"Try"		Primary; Genesio		1:01
21.	"He Is Bad Guy"		Primary		1:18
22.	"Countdown"		Primary		1:04
23.	"Trick"		Primary; Genesio		1:12
24.	"I Kill Jinman"		Primary		2:36
25.	"Hide"		Primary		1:22
26.	"Robot Dog"		Primary; Genesio		1:04
27.	"Close Murthehelp"		Primary		1:00
28.	"Minhye Action"		Primary		2:29
29.	"Bale"		Primary		1:13
30.	"Kill Bale"		Primary		2:25
31.	"Killers"		Primary		3:48
32.	"Airplane"		Primary		1:16
33.	"Laos"		Primary		1:14
34.	"Run"		Primary; Genesio		1:02
35.	"Wrap Up"		Primary		1:09
36.	"Battle"		Primary		1:08
37.	"Jinman's Mother"		Primary; Idoo		1:28
38.	"First Mall"		Primary		2:08
39.	"Family"		Primary		4:16
40.	"Wait"		Primary		2:56
41.	"No Mercy"		Primary		3:44
42.	"Help"		Primary; Genesio		1:11
43.	"Build"		Primary		3:39
44.	"Trap"		Primary; Genesio		1:01
45.	"End"		Primary		1:27
46.	"Wanted"		Primary		0:57
47.	"New Boss"		Primary		1:32
48.	"Ruin"		Primary; Genesio		3:55
49.	"Bus"		Primary		1:39
50.	"A Shop of Killers"		Primary		2:30
51.	"Act"		Primary; Genesio		1:04
52.	"How Can I Be Late" (Inst.)		Benzamin; Genesio		4:17
Total length:					1:46:58

== Release ==
The first season of A Shop for Killers was released worldwide on Disney+ on January 17, 2024. It was also released on Hulu in the United States.

The second season is scheduled to be released on July 22, 2026.

== Reception ==
=== Critical response ===
On the review aggregator website Rotten Tomatoes, 100% of 6 critics' reviews are positive. Joel Keller of Decider found the series' early narrative "straightforward", noting that the simplicity allowed for well-executed action and meaningful character exploration. Sarah Musnicky of But Why Tho? awarded the series a 7.5 out of 10, characterizing it as an "action-packed" experience featuring compelling characters that "lure [the viewer] in". Sayantan Gayen of Comic Book Resources observed that while the plot still had much to uncover, the initial episodes were successful in making viewers "anxious to get their hands on the next installment".

However, critical reception of the overall narrative was more varied. Puah Ziwei of NME called it a "thrilling K-drama", but pointed out "logical inconsistencies and plot holes", specifically citing the protagonist's name change and Jin-man's "peculiar" behaviors as points of confusion. Similarly, Pierce Conran of the South China Morning Post gave the series a 3 out of 5 rating; while he praised the "stylish opening", he suggested the conclusion might leave some viewers with "buyer's remorse".

=== Viewership ===
Disney+ announced that the series was the most viewed local original on the platform in the Asia Pacific region (Note: Asia Pacific region includes Australia, New Zealand, Japan, South Korea, Taiwan, Hong Kong, Singapore and the Philippines.) in 2024, until it was surpassed by Light Shop in December.

=== Accolades ===
==== Awards and nominations ====
Name of the award ceremony, year presented, category, nominee(s) of the award, and the result of the nomination
Award ceremony	Year	Category	Nominee / Work	Result	Ref.
Blue Dragon Series Awards	2024	Best Supporting Actor	Seo Hyun-woo	Nominated	
Blue Dragon Series Awards	2024	Best Supporting Actress	Geum Hae-na	Won	
Blue Dragon Series Awards	2024	Best New Actress	Kim Hye-jun	Nominated	

==== Listicles ====
Name of publisher, year listed, name of listicle, and placement
Publisher	Year	Listicle	Placement	Ref.
Cine21	2024	Top 10 Series of 2024	8th place	
The New York Times	2024	Best International	Included	
NME	2024	The 10 best K-dramas of 2024 – so far	Included	
NME	2024	The 10 best Korean dramas of 2024	7th place	
South China Morning Post	2024	The 15 best K-dramas of 2024	15th place	
Time Magazine	2024	The 10 Best K-Dramas of 2024	4th place	
