= Class of Lies =

2019 South Korean television series

- Promotional poster
- Also known as: Undercover Teacher
- Hangul: 미스터 기간제
- Lit.: Mr. Temporary
- RR: Miseuteo giganje
- MR: Misŭt'ŏ kiganje
- Genre: Teen drama Thriller
- Created by: Studio Dragon
- Written by: Jang Hong-cheol
- Directed by: Sung Yong-il; Park Ji-hyun
- Starring: Yoon Kyun-sang; Keum Sae-rok; Choi Yu-hwa
- Country of origin: South Korea
- Original language: Korean
- No. of episodes: 16

Production
- Executive producer: Jang Jeong Do
- Producers: Park Jeong jun Lee Jin seok
- Camera setup: Single-camera
- Running time: 60 minutes
- Production company: JS Pictures

Original release
- Network: OCN
- Release: July 17 – September 5, 2019

Class of Lies (Korean: 미스터 기간제; RR: Miseuteo giganje) is a 2019 South Korean television series starring Yoon Kyun-sang, Keum Sae-rok, and Choi Yu-hwa. It aired on OCN's Wednesdays and Thursdays at 23:00 KST from July 17 to September 5, 2019.

== Synopsis ==
Gi Moo-hyeok is a high-profile lawyer who goes undercover under the name Gi Kang-jae as a substitute teacher at an elite private high school i.e Chunmyung High School to investigate the murder of a female student.

== Plot ==
Jeong Soo-ah, a model and popular student at Chunmyung High School, is stabbed on her bed. Classmate Kim Han-soo is seen hovering over her body with a bloody knife. Gi Moo-hyeok, an ace lawyer with the prestigious Songha law firm, is assigned to defend Kim Han-soo. Songha has been retained by Chunmyung High School, which is more interested in settling the case quietly to preserve its public image than in discovering the truth. Gi Moo-hyeok tries to persuade Kim Han-soo to take a plea deal, admitting to the murder in exchange for a lighter sentence. Han-soo refuses, and claims that he is the victim's boyfriend. He is more concerned about Soo-ah's condition than his own legal plight.

Lacking Kim Han-soo's cooperation, Gi tries to create reasonable doubt during the trial by revealing a photo that suggests that Jeong Soo-ah is an escort and that any of her male clients could have attacked her. The stunt enrages Kim Han-soo, who causes a ruckus and claims that he did stab Jeong. Gi's case collapses after Kim Han-soo attempts suicide after he receives a mysterious visit, and he falls into a coma. Jeong Soo-ah dies from her injuries and Kim Han-soo is charged with murder. Gi Moo-hyeok's career crashes as he is fired from Songha due to the allegations of bribery and tax fraud and his license to practice is suspended. Putting all the events together, Gi realizes that his boss, Lee Do-Jin set him up for ulterior motive after realizing that Lee's son, Lee Gi-hoon also attends the same high school as the victim of the case.

In order to regain his reputation as a lawyer, Gi obtains a temporary teaching job at Chunmyung under an assumed name, Gi Kang-jae. As Gi Kang-jae, he clashes with Ha So-hyeon, the school's PE teacher and counselor, who is too earnest and naive to believe that her students are capable of the physical and online bullying that Gi encountered early on. Eventually, the two team up to uncover the Veritas Club, a secret society of privileged students who control teachers and fellow students to burnish their school records.

Can Gi Moo-hyeok and Ha So-hyeon solve the murder case and exonerate Kim Han-soo?

== Cast ==
=== Main ===
- Yoon Kyun-sang as Gi Moo-hyeok / Gi Kang-jae

Gi Moo-Hyeok is a self-absorbed lawyer who only cares about money. He worked for the best law firm in the country, Songha. Moo-Hyeok was assigned to defend a high school student, Kim Han-soo, charged with the attempted murder of Jeong Soo-ah. As substitute teacher, Gi Kang-jae teaches laws, politics, and German.

- Keum Sae-rok as Ha So-hyeon

The earnest P.E. teacher and school counselor at Chunmyung High School. She is also the homeroom teacher of Class 3. She unconditionally trusts and supports her students. She believes all her students are her "children".

- Choi Yu-hwa as Cha Hyeon-jeong

A criminal ace prosecutor from the Prosecutor's Office and Gi Moo-hyuk's rival from their time at the Judicial Research and Training Institute. She is the prosecutor of the Kim Han-soo case.

=== Supporting ===
==== Veritas Club members ====
Veritas Club is the most powerful club in Chunmyung High School. It annually holds meetings with other selective students of Chunmyung High School for them to falsify awards on student records so that they can enter prestigious universities. It also helps students to forge their student records.

- Lee Jun-young as Yoo Beom-jin

Yoo Beom-jin is the top student who is a genius and perfectionist. He has countless achievements, especially in debate. He has been respected as a likeable and genuine student according to his schoolmates. He is the president of Veritas Club. His father is Yoo Yang-gi, the country congressman and presidential candidate.

- Choi Kyu-jin as Lee Gi-hoon

Lee Gi-hoon is the son of Lee Do-jin, Gi Moo-hyuk's former boss and the president of Songha law firm. He takes an interest in photography as a hobby and runs the school's photography club. For a student who is known for his family's legal background, he is not very interested in studying. He's secretly Jeong Soo-ah's stalker.

- Han So-eun as Han Tae-ra

Han Tae-ra is Chunmyung High School's "queen bee". Her mother, Woo Eun-hye, runs a cram tutoring school. Best known for being accomplished, she is also often involved in social activities outside school hours. She and Yoo Beom-jin were a well-known school couple by other students. She is jealous of Jeong Soo-ah for getting too close with Yoo Beom-jin.

- Kim Myung-ji as Na Ye-ri

Na Ye-ri is an idol trainee and the school's self-proclaimed idol. Na Ye-ri's father was transferred to a branch in India after he was caught assaulting and harassing his subordinates and contractors. This made her desperate to quickly debut as an idol and exceed everyone else in Veritas Club. For her to achieve that, she used her own sasaeng fan to spread rumors online about other students, including Jeong Soo-ah.

==== Chunmyung's students ====
- Jang Dong-joo as Kim Han-soo

Kim Han-soo is an orphan. His dream is to become a P.E. teacher when he grows up. He was accused of stalking and murdering Jeong Soo-ah. In order to shorten the length of his sentence, Gi Moo-hyeok asks Kim Han-soo to admit to the crime but he refuses and claims that he is Jeong Soo-ah's boyfriend. He was a popular student for joining Chunmyung High School's clique with school bullies like Son Joon-jae and Jang Jeong-tae as soon as he entered the school.

- Jung Da-eun as Jeong Soo-ah / Park Yoo-sun
  - Choi Yoo-ri as young Yoo-sun.

Jeong Soo-ah is a murder victim. She entered Chunmyung High School with a false identity. Her real name is Park Yoo-sun and was Kim Han-soo's childhood friend. They both grew up at the same orphanage until the age of 10. She was adopted by a couple but end up being abused after they had their own child. She is two years older than her classmates. Jeong Soo-ah is a very smart student and was one of the Veritas Club members along with the other four top students. She has been bullied by Han Tae-ra and Na Ye-ri. She is a model under Lee Tae-sok's entertainment agency and secretly a courtesan for Yoo Yang-gi.

- Byung Hun as Ahn Byeong-ho

Ahn Byung-ho entered Chunmyung High School through a program that provides support for children from lower-income families to study at the elite high school. However, he feels alienated and has been bullied by his classmates who look down on him because of his social status. He is nicknamed 'Porter' by the students.

- Kwon So-hyun as Seo Yoon-ah

Seo Yoon-ah is the president of the broadcasting club at Chunmyung High School. She has a bright personality and is considerate of others, but she is also very assertive about her opinions. She is the only one who knows Gi Moo-hyeok's real identity and helps Ha So-hyeon and Gi Moo-hyeok solve Chunmyung High School's murder case.

- Shin Jae-hwi as Son Joon-jae

Son Joon-jae is a student who dreams of working in the finance industry. His father's business went bankrupt and he is being pursued by loan sharks. His father fled overseas and left him and his mom behind to be harassed by loan sharks. Son Joon-jae runs Chunmyung High School's band club and the school's illegal pawn shop. He is also a school bully. He was Kim Han-soo's friend.

- Lee Bit-na as Lee Ji-eun

Lee Ji-eun is Seo Yoon-ah's junior in Chunmyung High School's broadcasting club.

==== Chunmyung's teachers ====
- Jeon Seok-ho as Lee Tae-seok

Lee Tae-seok is Chunmyung High School's general manager and the CEO of an entertainment company. He is called "Butler Lee" by Veritas Club members. He is the leading candidate to acquire Woonam University from his brother.

- Woo Hyeon-joo as Jeon Young-hye

Jeon Young-hye is Chunmyung High School's senior teacher.

- Seo Yoon-ah as Jo Mi-joo

Jo Mi-joo is an English teacher, homeroom teacher of Class 2, and department head of the 11th grade.

- Kim Ye-won as Sin Hye-soo

Sin Hye-soo is a Korean language teacher and close to Ha So-hyeon.

- Yoon Ji-wook as Kang Woo-jin

Kang Woo-jin is a music teacher. He is an elite musician from Germany.

==== Parents ====
- Yoo Sung-joo as Lee Do-jin

Lee Do-jin is Lee Gi-hoon's father. He is the president of the best law firm in the country, Songha, and Gi Moo-hyuk's former boss.

- Kim Min-sang as Yoo Yang-gi

Yoo Yang-gi is Yoo Beom-jin's father. As the country congressman and presidential candidate, he is obsessed with perfection and would go through any lengths to get what he wants. He is a very strict father to Yoo Beom-jin.

- Seo Ji-young as Woo Eun-hye

Woo Eun-hye is Han Tae-ra's mother. She runs a cram tutoring school.

- Lee Jin-ah as Yoon Jeong-ok

Yoon Jeong-ok is Yoo Beom-jin's mother and Yoo Yang-gi's wife.

==== People around Gi Moo-hyeok ====
- Lee Soon-won as Park Won-seok

Park Won-seok is Gi Moo-hyuk's best friend, a hacker and ace of a private detective agency.

- Ji Chan as Song Jae-woo

Song Jae-woo is a lawyer and Gi Moo-hyuk's rival at Songha law firm.

==== Others ====
- Lee Jung-min as Kim So-hee

Kim So-hee is Gi Moo-hyuk's secretary at Songha law firm.

- Kwon Hyuk as Yang Sang-bae

Yang Sang-bae is Deputy Chief Prosecutor from Seoul Central District Prosecutor Office of the criminal department and Cha Hyeon-jeong's deputy manager.

- Cha Joong-won as Jang Jeong-tae

Jang Jung-tae is a Chunmyung student and Son Joon-jae's friend. Like Joon-jae, he is a school bully and was Kim Han-soo's friend.

- Park Gun-rak as Oh Gi-hwan

Oh Gi-hwan is a lieutenant at the Seoul Metropolitan Police Agency. He handles cases involving Kim Han-soo. He has a young daughter who is terminally ill. He accepts bribe from Yong-gi to cover Sooh-ah's murder to pay for his daughter's heart surgery.

- Lee Jung-joon-II as Kim Hyeong-gyoo

Kim Hyeong-gyoo is Chunmyung's student and Son Joon-jae's follower. Like Ahn Byeong-ho, he is also a victim of school bullying.

- Wie Ji-Yeon as Min-Ji

Choi Min-ji is a Chunmyung student.

- Choo Soo Bin as Park Eun-kyeong

Park Eun-kyeong is a Chunmyung student.

- Kim Jin as Yoon Kyeong-min

Yoon Kyeong-min is a Chunmyung student.

- Lee Won-jung as Lee Jeong-soo

A student.

- Shin Young-kyu as Jeong Seon-woo

Jeong Seon-woo is a Chunmyung student.

- Kim Min-ho as Lee Yoon-tae

Lee Yoon-tae is the founder and director of the Chunmyung Foundation. He is the father of Lee Tae-seok. He is hospitalized due to his old age.

- Choi Ho-jeong as Kang Ji-ho

Kang Ji-ho is reporter from Prime Journal.

==== Special appearances ====
- Lee Jun-hyeok as a CEO trying to steal a yongdoli mask patent (Ep. 1)
- Tae Won-seok as the designer of the yongdoli mask (Ep. 1)
- Lee Chae-kyung as judge (Ep. 1-2, 16)
- Kim Min-ah as high school girl (Ep. 2)
- No Seong-eun as high school boy (Ep. 2)
- Kim Tae-gyum as Prosecutor Park (Ep. 2)

A public prosecutor

- Lee Ha-yeong as Chunmyung High School's broadcasting club member (Ep. 2, 5)
- Lee Ye-rin as a model from Lee Tae-seok's entertainment agency. (Ep. 6)
- Ahn Chan-woong as prison officer (Ep. 1, 11)
- Park Se-hoon as prison officer (Ep. 1, 11)
- Kim O-bok as police officer from Seoul Metropolitan Police Agency (ep.11)
- Jo Jae-hyeon as Hwang Gi-taek (ep.11)

A "Single Life Club" staff and former conscripted policeman.

- Jang Gwang as Congressman Park Gi-sang (Ep. 15)

A candidate for the next presidential election.

== Original soundtrack ==
Class of Lies OST

Soundtrack album by Various artists
- Recorded: 2019
- Genre: Soundtrack
- Languages: Korean; English
- Labels: Genie Music; Stone Music Entertainment

=== Part 1 ===
Released on July 25, 2019
| No. | Title | Lyrics | Music | Artist | Length |
|---|---|---|---|---|---|
| 1. | "Win" (염따) | YumDDa | Oh Byeong-ju | YumDDa | 2:59 |
| 2. | "Win" (Inst.) | | Oh Byeong-ju | | 2:59 |
| Total length: | | | | | 5:58 |

=== Part 2 ===
Released on August 8, 2019
| No. | Title | Lyrics | Music | Artist | Length |
|---|---|---|---|---|---|
| 1. | "A Silver Spoon" (난 놈) | ODEE; QM | Park Eun-woo; Kim Tae-joon | ODEE; QM | 3:16 |
| 2. | "A Silver Spoon" (Inst.) | | Park Eun-woo; Kim Tae-joon | | 3:16 |
| Total length: | | | | | 6:32 |

=== Part 3 ===
Released on August 28, 2019
| No. | Title | Lyrics | Music | Artist | Length |
|---|---|---|---|---|---|
| 1. | "I'm Alive" (테일러) | Park Eun-woo; Mitch Auvenshine | Taylor; Kim Min | Taylor | 3:38 |
| 2. | "I'm Alive" (Inst.) | | Taylor; Kim Min | | 3:38 |
| Total length: | | | | | 7:16 |

== Ratings ==
Class of Lies : South Korea viewers per episode (thousands)

| Season | Episode number | | | | | | | | | | | | | | | | Average |
| Season | 1 | 2 | 3 | 4 | 5 | 6 | 7 | 8 | 9 | 10 | 11 | 12 | 13 | 14 | 15 | 16 | Average |
|---|---|---|---|---|---|---|---|---|---|---|---|---|---|---|---|---|---|
| 1 | 403 | 540 | 623 | 584 | 671 | 824 | 752 | 739 | 804 | 858 | 868 | 815 | 746 | 826 | 926 | 1031 | 751 |

Source: Audience measurement performed nationwide by Nielsen Media Research.

Average TV viewership ratings
| Ep. | Original broadcast date | Average audience share (AGB Nielsen) | |
| Ep. | Original broadcast date | Nationwide | Seoul |
|---|---|---|---|
| 1 | July 17, 2019 | 1.814% | 2.452% |
| 2 | July 18, 2019 | 2.413% | 2.760% |
| 3 | July 24, 2019 | 2.686% | 2.913% |
| 4 | July 25, 2019 | 2.495% | 2.515% |
| 5 | July 31, 2019 | 3.008% | 2.806% |
| 6 | August 1, 2019 | 3.135% | 3.413% |
| 7 | August 7, 2019 | 2.975% | 3.505% |
| 8 | August 8, 2019 | 3.579% | 3.976% |
| 9 | August 14, 2019 | 3.547% | 3.668% |
| 10 | August 15, 2019 | 3.563% | 3.985% |
| 11 | August 21, 2019 | 3.683% | 3.562% |
| 12 | August 22, 2019 | 3.805% | 4.141% |
| 13 | August 28, 2019 | 3.529% | 3.911% |
| 14 | August 29, 2019 | 3.544% | 4.188% |
| 15 | September 4, 2019 | 4.257% | 4.760% |
| 16 | September 5, 2019 | 4.781% | 4.665% |
| Average | | 3.301% | 3.576% |
In the table above, the blue numbers represent the lowest ratings and the red numbers represent the highest ratings.; This drama aired on a cable channel/pay TV which normally has a relatively smaller audience compared to free-to-air TV/public broadcasters (KBS, SBS, MBC and EBS).

== Awards and nominations ==
Name of the award ceremony, year presented, category, nominee of the award, and the result of the nomination
| Award ceremony | Year | Category | Nominee / Work | Result | Ref. |
|---|---|---|---|---|---|
| OCN Awards | 2019 | The Best Case Solver Award | Yoon Kyun-sang | Nominated | |
| OCN Awards | 2019 | The Capability Award | Lee Jun-young | Nominated | |
| OCN Awards | 2019 | The Capability Award | Choi Kyu-jin | Nominated | |
| OCN Awards | 2019 | The Unexpected Award | "Win" by YumDDa | Nominated | |
| OCN Awards | 2019 | Soles on Fire Award | Keum Sae-rok | Won | |
