= Chip In =

2020 South Korean television series

- Promotional poster
- Hangul: 십시일반
- Hanja: 十匙一飯
- Lit.: United Effort to Accomplish One Thing
- RR: Sipsiilban
- MR: Sipsiilban
- Genre: Mystery; Comedy; Thriller
- Written by: Choi Kyeong
- Directed by: Jin Chang-gyu
- Starring: Oh Na-ra; Kim Hye-jun
- Country of origin: South Korea
- Original language: Korean
- No. of episodes: 8

Production
- Production company: MBC

Original release
- Network: MBC TV
- Release: July 22 – August 13, 2020

Chip In (Korean: 십시일반; RR: Sipsiilban) is a 2020 South Korean television series starring Oh Na-ra and Kim Hye-jun. It aired on MBC from July 22 to August 13, 2020, at 21:30 (KST) for 8 episodes.

== Synopsis ==
A famous painter, Yoo In-ho (Nam Moon-chul) gets diagnosed as terminally ill. On his 58th birthday, he plans to share his last will and testimony. His legacy and immense wealth slowly draw out his family's greed, causing a fierce mental battle amongst them. There are too many people around him who are only after his legacy and wealth, including his ex-wife Ji Sul-young (Kim Jung-young), who has to take care of him, Kim Ji-hye (Oh Na-ra), a former mistress and mother of his only child and daughter, Bit-na (Kim Hye-jun), and his half-brother Dok Ko-chul (Han Soo-Hyun).

== Cast ==
=== Main ===
- Oh Na-ra as Kim Ji-hye, the mistress of Yoo In-ho.
- Kim Hye-jun as Yoo Bit-na, a nurse student and the only daughter of the painter Yoo In-ho who is not interested in his wealth and legacy.
  - Song Ji-woo as young Bit-na

=== Supporting ===
==== Yoo family ====
- Nam Moon-chul as Yoo In-ho, Bit-na's father who is a famous painter that was diagnosed as terminally ill.
- Kim Jung-young as Ji Sul-young, In-ho's ex-wife who came back to nurse him after it was discovered that he was terminally ill.
- Choi Kyu-jin as Yoo Hae-joon, In-ho's nephew from his deceased brother, Yoo In-gook who is a law student and whom he adopted as his son.
  - Ok Chan-yu as young Hae-joon
- Han Soo-hyun as Dok Go-chul, In-ho's half-brother who is a conman with four convictions of fraud.
- Kim Si-eun as Dok Go-sun, Dok Go-chul's daughter and In-ho's niece who lives in his house.

==== Yoo family employees ====
- Lee Yoon-hee as Moon Jung-wook, In-ho's friend from college and also his manager who lives in the same house.
- Nam Mi-jung as Mrs. Park, the family maid who has been working for 20 years.
- Kim Myung-sun as Jin Yeon-hee, a lawyer and the executor of Yoo In-ho's last will and testimony.

=== Others ===
- Lee Seung-hyeong as a doctor
- Jung Chul-soon as Detective Kang
- Park Jung-eon as a reporter
- Kwon Dong-ho as Detective Hong Jae-gyu
- Jang Jae-kwon as an interviewer
- Wie Shin-ae as a pharmacist

== Ratings ==
In this table, the blue numbers represent the lowest ratings and the red numbers represent the highest ratings.

Ep.	Part	Original broadcast date	Average audience share (Nielsen Korea)
Ep.	Part	Original broadcast date	Nationwide
1	1	July 22, 2020	3.7%
1	2	July 22, 2020	3.9%
2	1	July 23, 2020	2.8%
2	2	July 23, 2020	3.3%
3	1	July 29, 2020	3.0%
3	2	July 29, 2020	3.9%
4	1	July 30, 2020	2.4%
4	2	July 30, 2020	2.8%
5	1	August 5, 2020	2.9%
5	2	August 5, 2020	3.2%
6	1	August 6, 2020	2.4%
6	2	August 6, 2020	2.8%
7	1	August 12, 2020	2.1%
7	2	August 12, 2020	3.2%
8	1	August 13, 2020	2.7%
8	2	August 13, 2020	3.3%
Average			3.0%

== Awards and nominations ==
Year	Award	Category	Recipient	Result
2020	39th MBC Drama Awards	Top Excellence Award, Actress in a Monday-Tuesday Miniseries / Short Drama	Oh Na-ra	Nominated
2020	39th MBC Drama Awards	Excellence Award, Actress in a Monday-Tuesday Miniseries / Short Drama	Kim Hye-jun	Nominated
2020	39th MBC Drama Awards	Best Supporting Actor	Nam Moon-Chul	Nominated
2020	39th MBC Drama Awards	Best New Actor	Choi Kyu-jin	Nominated
2020	39th MBC Drama Awards	Best New Actress	Kim Hye-jun	Won
