= Metamorphosis (2019 South Korean film) =

- Theatrical release poster
- Directed by: Kim Hong-seon
- Written by: Kim Hong-seon
- Produced by: Hyun-joo Jung
- Starring: Bae Seong-woo; Sung Dong-il; Jang Young-nam; Kim Hye-jun; Cho Yi-hyun; Kim Kang-hoon
- Cinematography: Yoon Ju Hwan
- Edited by: Shin Min-kyung
- Music by: Kim Jun-seong
- Production company: Dana Creative
- Distributed by: Acemaker Movieworks; Sega Sammy Entertainment; Shudder
- Release date: August 21, 2019
- Running time: 113 minutes
- Country: South Korea
- Language: Korean
- Box office: US$12.9 million

Metamorphosis (Original title: 변신, Hanja: 變身, Byeonshin) is a 2019 South Korean supernatural horror film written and directed by Kim Hong-seon and starring Bae Seong-woo, Sung Dong-il, Jang Young-nam, Kim Hye-jun, Cho Yi-hyun, and Kim Kang-hoon. The film received two nominations from Blue Dragon Film Awards (South Korea).

== Plot ==
When a troubled family moves into a new house because their pastor uncle was accused of murdering a child, things do not add up from the very beginning. The family members do not know that the face-changing devil, whom their uncle tried to expel from the child's body, has sworn to destroy the pastor's family at any cost.

== Cast ==
- Bae Seong-woo as Joong-soo, a priest who failed to exorcise a girl possessed by a demon causing her to die
- Sung Dong-il as Gang-goo, Joong-soo's older brother and father of Sun-woo, Hyun-joo, Woo-jong
- Jang Young-nam as Myung-joo, Gang-goo's wife
- Kim Hye-jun as Sun-woo, a college student
- Cho Yi-hyun as Hyun-joo, a high school student
- Kim Kang-hoon as Woo-jong, an elementary school student
- Jeon Mi-do as Girl's Mother
- Kim Se-hee as Girl
- Baek Yoon-sik as Balthazar
- Oh Dae-hwan as Man next door
- Ronnie Henares as Filipino Priest 1
- Joel Saracho as Filipino Priest 2
- Archie Adamos as Filipino Priest 3
- Troy Webb as Filipino Priest 4
- Bing Pimentel as Elder Filipino Nun

== Reception ==
Patrick Brennan of Dread Central wrote, "Though visually inventive at times, Metamorphosis ultimately feels far too familiar to standout from the rest of the exorcism entries in horror today." Scott Weinberg of Thrillist added, " A bit too long and beholden to similar possession flicks, but there's still some impressive filmmaking here." William Schwartz of HanCinema wrote that while the film is "not particularly original", it "makes the smart decision to portray the spirit as a fairly mundane problem which exorcists deal with the same way a plumber might deal with a clogged pipe", and called the tension "absolutely superb" and the imagery "disturbing yet distinctly the work of a mortal hand, which makes it all the creepier."
