= List of Running Man episodes (2025) =

- No. of episodes: 50+ 1 Special

Release
- Original network: SBS
- Original release: January 5 – December 28, 2025

Season chronology
- ← Previous; 2024 Next → 2026

This is a list of episodes of the South Korean variety show Running Man in 2025. The show airs on SBS as part of their Good Sunday lineup.

== Episodes ==
List of episodes broadcast in 2025 (734–783)
Ep.	Airdate	Title	Guest(s)	Teams	Mission	Results	Ref.
734 (Note: Kang Hoon returns in this episode.)	January 5, 2025 (Note: This episode was originally scheduled to aired on December 29, 2024, but later was cancelled and postponed until January 5, 2025, due to the Jeju Air Flight 2216 crash incident.)	Resolve to Part Ways with 2024 (2024와 헤어질 결심)	Kang Hoon	Jae-suk Team (Yoo Jae-suk, Haha, Kim Jong-kook, Ji Ye-eun); Seok-jin's Team (Jee Seok-jin, Song Ji-hyo, Yang Se-chan, Kang Hoon)	Keep moving your items to someone else's box to win the prizes.	There are no winners. Yoo Jae-suk and Yang Se-chan chose Kim Jong-kook to write a letter and buy a gift for the owner of the items in their boxes as penalty, with the penalty gifts and letters will be revealed next episode. (see the next episode below.)	
735 (Note: New Year Special.) (Note: Special appearance by Kang Hoon via archive recording.)	January 12, 2025	The Lucky 2025 (운 타는 2025)	No guest	Green Team (Yoo Jae-suk); Blue Team (Haha, Yang Se-chan); Orange Team (Jee Seok-jin, Song Ji-hyo); Pink Team (Kim Jong-kook, Ji Ye-eun)	Defeat the other team.	Previous Mission's Penalty:Yoo Jae-suk receive his own letter and a Christmas music box gift for himself. Kim Jong-kook write letters and bought gifts: a hat for Jee Seok-jin, a box of soju for Song Ji-hyo and a beanie hat and the soccer shoes for Kang Hoon. Yang Se-chan receive his own letter and luxury belt while also writes letters and bought gifts: the designer underwear for Haha and a muffler for Ji Ye-eun. Result: The mission was won by Green Team and Orange Team. Haha and Yang Se-chan receive the gold prize while Jee Seok-jin and Song Ji-hyo each receive a box of seasonal fruits. Through a game of luck, Haha and Ji Ye-eun receive the whipped cream penalty.	
736 (Note: Jeon So-min returns in this episode as a guest after leaving Running Man)	January 19, 2025	Team Kill Not Sorry (팀킬이라 지송합니다)	Choi Daniel; Jeon So-min; Kim Ha-yun; Park Hye-jeong	MC Yoo (Yoo Jae-suk); Haha Team (Haha, Yang Se-chan, Ji Ye-eun, Choi Daniel, Jeon So-min); Jong Kook Team (Kim Jong-kook, Jee Seok-jin, Song Ji-hyo, Kim Ha-yun, Park Hye-jeong)	Avoid hitting your name behind the balloon by Yoo Jae-suk's dart to escape the penalty.	The mission was won by Yoo Jae-suk, Kim Ha-yun and Park Hye-jeong. Kim Ha-yun and Park Hye-jeong each receive the fruit and Korean pork gift set. Haha, Jee Seok-jin, Kim Jong-kook, Song Ji-hyo, Yang Se-chan, Ji Ye-eun, Choi Daniel and Jeon So-min receive the water cannon penalty.	
737 (Note: Lunar New Year Special.)	January 26, 2025	The Blessed Gods Ratio Part.3 (복스러운 갓성비 3탄)	No guest	Teams: (Yoo Jae-suk & Ji Ye-eun) (Haha & Jee Seok-jin) (Song Ji-hyo & Yang Se-chan); Solo: (Kim Jong-kook)	Either complete the words "Blue Snake" or obtain the word "Snake" to avoid penalty.	The mission was won by Haha, who complete the words "Blue Snake", and Yoo Jae-suk who obtain the word "Snake". Haha receive a box of fruit gift set that he choose. Jee Seok-jin, Kim Jong-kook, Song Ji-hyo, Yang Se-chan and Ji Ye-eun had to make a snake lucky bag after filming as a penalty.	
738	February 2, 2025	The Person Who Laughs in Paradise (낙원에서 웃는 자)	Kyuhyun (Super Junior); Lee Seok-hoon (SG Wannabe); Park Eun-tae	RC Car to Paradise: Glasses Team (Yoo Jae-suk, Haha, Jee Seok-jin, Lee Seok-hoon); Remained Team (Kim Jong-kook, Yang Se-chan, Kyuhyun); Sister Team (Song Ji-hyo, Ji Ye-eun, Park Eun-tae); First Paradise/Inferno Teams: Paradise Team (Yoo Jae-suk, Song Ji-hyo, Yang Se-chan, Ji Ye-eun, Kyuhyun, Park Eun-tae); Inferno Team (Haha, Jee Seok-jin, Kim Jong-kook, Lee Seok-hoon) The One Who Sings the Correct Answer: Jae-suk Team (Yoo Jae-suk, Haha, Kim Jong-kook, Ji Ye-eun, Kyuhyun); Seok-jin Team (Jee Seok-jin, Song Ji-hyo, Yang Se-chan, Lee Seok-hoon, Park Eun-tae); Second Paradise/Inferno Teams: Inferno Team (Yoo Jae-suk, Song Ji-hyo, Yang Se-chan, Ji Ye-eun, Kyuhyun); Paradise Team (Haha, Jee Seok-jin, Kim Jong-kook, Lee Seok-hoon, Park Eun-tae) Relay Race to Escape Inferno: Yellow Team (Yoo Jae-suk, Jee Seok-jin, Song Ji-hyo, Yang Se-chan, Park Eun-tae); Pink Team (Haha, Kim Jong-kook, Ji Ye-eun, Kyuhyun, Lee Seok-hoon)	Obtain the most tickets to win the race.	The Mission was won by Yoo Jae-suk with 11 tickets. Yoo Jae-suk, along with Song Ji-hyo, Yang Se-chan and Kyuhyun, who received the Shredded Paper Shower penalty, each received a box of honey. Through game of luck, Jee Seok-jin, Kim Jong-kook, Ji Ye-eun and Park Eun-tae each received the water shower, with Lee Seok-hoon received black ink shower instead. Penalty: Shredded Paper Shower (Haha, Song Ji-hyo, Yang Se-chan, Kyuhyun); Water Shower (Jee Seok-jin, Kim Jong-kook, Ji Ye-eun, Park Eun-tae); Black Ink Shower (Lee Seok-hoon)	
739 (Note: Special Appearance by Robert Pattinson.)	February 9, 2025	The Chaotic Life of Slaves (혼돈의 노비생활)	No guest	Yoo Jae-suk as Bucktooth; Haha as Dullard; Jee Seok-jin as Floret; Kim Jong-kook as April; Song Ji-hyo as Brainiac; Yang Se-chan as Dog Turd; Ji Ye-eun as Hunchback	Finish the errands that were given by the master before 4 PM to get off work early.	Mission Accomplished. Since the members finished the errands exactly 10 minutes before 4 PM, they can get off work early.	
740 (Note: This episode teasing the topic for next week episode.)	February 16, 2025	The Don't Go Family (돈고돈락 패밀리)	Joo Jong-hyuk; Kim Si-eun	Jae-suk Family (Yoo Jae-suk, Yang Se-chan, Joo Jong-hyuk); Haha Family (Haha, Ji Ye-eun, Kim Si-eun); Seok-jin Family (Jee Seok-jin, Kim Jong-kook, Song Ji-hyo)	Have the most money on their debit card to avoid penalty.	The Mission was won by Jae-suk Family, who had ₩245,000 in their debit card, that was used to buy the expensive whiskey prize that they choose. Through the game of luck, Haha and Kim Si-eun received the whipped cream penalty.	
741 (Note: Former Running Man PD Choi Bo-Pil was mentioned in this episode in 2 and a half years since his last appearance.) (Note: Jee Seok-jin's Birthday was celebrated in this episode.)	February 23, 2025	SOS The Cleanup Code: Heroes on Call (SOS 중증정리구역)	No guest	No teams	Help Kim Jong-kook clean his house and obtain the items that were chosen with his permission.	Mission Accomplished. Kim Jong-kook received ₩ 2,000,000 worth of housewarming party gift certificate from Production Team. Through the Running Man ball, Jee Seok-jin, Song Ji-hyo, Yang Se-chan and Ji Ye-eun each choose the items that they wanted respectively. Items that the member choose: Jee Seok-jin - Dior Shoes (Note: The Dior shoes was originally a gift that Former Running Man PD Choi Bo-pil gave to Kim Jong-kook after he sang the song at Bo-pil's wedding.); Song Ji-hyo - Yeezy slide slippers Yang Se-chan - Headphone; Ji Ye-eun - Stüssy sweatshirt	
742 (Note: Brief appearance by Chanyeol (Exo).)	March 2, 2025	Love Consumption (나의 완벽한 소비)	Choi Daniel; Kim Ah-young	No teams	Spend all the money.	There are no winners, with the total of their remained balance of ₩ 1,697,260. Through game of luck, Yoo Jae-suk, Kim Jong-kook, Yang Se-chan and Kim Ah-young were exempted from the penalty. Haha, Jee Seok-jin, Song Ji-hyo, Ji Ye-eun and Choi Daniel, whose penalty balls are drawn, had to give the seaweed to the citizens after the filming as a penalty.	
743	March 9, 2025	2025 Running Backup Championship (2025 런닝 후원선수권 대회)	Heo Kyung-hwan; Jang Seong-woo; Park Ji-won	Jae-suk Team (Yoo Jae-suk, Song Ji-hyo, Yang Se-chan, Heo Kyung-hwan, Park Ji-won) Jong-kook Team (Kim Jong-kook, Haha, Jee Seok-jin, Ji Ye-eun, Jang Seong-woo)	Have the highest number of stars on their team to avoid penalty.	The mission was won by Jae-suk Team with the total of 50 stars. Yang Se-chan and Heo Kyung-hwan and Park Ji-won, who were the top three of their team, each receive a Korean beef set prize. Haha, Jee Seok-jin and Ji Ye-eun, who were on the bottom three of their team, had to do lunges while going to their cars under the supervision of Kim Jong Kook, Jang Seong-woo and Park Ji-won as a penalty.	
744 (Note: TV Rating Notice Special.)	March 16, 2025	Going Up the TV Rating Notice (연령 '고지 상승')	No guest	No teams	Main Mission: Avoid filming the TV Rating Notice at the highest mountain. Main Side Mission: Avoid getting the "Climb Up" on the dice.	Main Mission Result: Mission Accomplished. with members successfully complete the main mission, they were able to film the TV Rating Notice at the 210m height of mountain. Main Side Mission Result: Yoo Jae-suk was able to climb down on the first dice attempt, while Haha, Song Ji-hyo, Yang Se-chan and Ji Ye-eun were able to climb down during the second dice attempt. Jee Seok-jin and Kim Jong-kook manage to climb down after the fourth dice attempt.	
745	March 23, 2025	Recharge After Work (퇴근은 충전순)	Hong Eun-chae; Sakura (Le Sserafim)	Jae-suk Team (Yoo Jae-suk, Jee Seok-jin, Sakura) Haha Team (Haha, Song Ji-hyo, Yang Se-chan) Jong-kook Team (Kim Jong-kook, Ji Ye-eun, Hong Eun-chae)	Be the first two teams to have a video call with the Main PD and say "저희 퇴근 하겠습니다!"	The mission was won by Jae-suk Team & Jong-kook Team. Haha Team had to untie the cables after the filming as a penalty.	
746 (Note: Special Appearance by NFL football quarterback Kyler Murray.)	March 30, 2025	How Did a Imogi Becomes a Dragon (이무기가 용 되는 법)	Kim Ji-yeon; Yook Sung-jae (BtoB)	Sung-jae Team (Yook Sung-jae, Yoo Jae-suk, Yang Se-chan, Ji Ye-eun) Ji-yeon Team (Kim Ji-yeon, Haha, Jee Seok-jin, Kim Jong-kook, Song Ji-hyo)	Have the highest amount of cintamani level on their team but without being the lowest individual level to avoid penalty	The mission was won by Sung-jae Team. Yoo Jae-suk, Yang Se-chan & Yook Sung-jae, who were the top three with the highest individual level, each received a setoka gift set. Ji Ye-eun, who had the lowest individual cintamani level, had to fly dragon-shaped kite with Haha, Jee Seok-jin & Kim Ji-yeon, who were the loser on Ji-yeon Team, after the filming as a penalty.	
747 (Note: Choi Daniel's first episode as rental member.)	April 6, 2025	He Said We're New Family (뉴패밀리 가라사대)	No guest	Foot Volleyball Game; Jae-suk Team (Yoo Jae-suk, Haha, Ji Ye-eun, Choi Daniel); Jong-kook Team (Kim Jong-kook, Jee Seok-jin, Song Ji-hyo, Yang Se-chan)	Have the most money while also not forcing Choi Daniel to hurry to avoid losing money.	The final mission was won by Jong-kook Team, with them receiving the picture that they took upon arriving at Dumulmeori as a prize. With their total remained balance of -₩ 88,100, Jae-suk Team had to pick a box of strawberries at a local farm before going home as a penalty.	
748	April 13, 2025	Determination to Drive (운전할 결심)	No guest	Foot Volleyball Game; Jae-suk Team (Yoo Jae-suk, Haha, Ji Ye-eun, Choi Daniel); Jong-kook Team (Kim Jong-kook, Jee Seok-jin, Song Ji-hyo, Yang Se-chan)	Help Ji Ye-eun learn how to drive.	Mission Accomplished.	
749	April 20, 2025	Merchant Chronicles: You Have to Earn to Live (상인 열전: 벌어야 산다)	No guest	Jae-suk Team (Yoo Jae-suk, Jee Seok-jin, Ji Ye-eun, Choi Daniel); Jong-kook Team (Kim Jong-kook, Haha, Song Ji-hyo, Yang Se-chan)	Have the most profit to avoid penalty.	The mission was won by Jong-kook Team. Jong-kook Team would receive 300 dollar Onnuri Gift Certificates as a prize. Jae-suk Team had to smash three gourds each before going home as a penalty.	
750 (Note: Black Day Special.) (Note: Choi Daniel did not attend the filming due to his work schedule.)	April 27, 2025	A Good Day for being Solo (솔로 하기 좋은 날)	Kai (Exo); Kim Ah-young	First Couple Teams: Couples (Yoo Jae-suk, Kim Jong-kook) (Haha, Song Ji-hyo) (Jee Seok-jin, Yang Se-chan) (Ji Ye-eun, Kim Ah-young); Solo (Kai) Second Couple Teams: Couples (Yoo Jae-suk, Kim Ah-young) (Haha, Song Ji-hyo) (Jee Seok-jin, Kim Jong-kook) (Yang Se-chan, Kai); Solo (Ji Ye-eun)	Avoid getting selected by the production team to escape the penalty.	The mission was won by Kai. Kai receives a box of jjajang ramyeon as a prize. Running Man members and Kim Ah-young, whose penalty ball were drawn, had to be paired and received the penalty. Penalties: Yoo Jae-suk & Haha - a finger flick Jee Seok-jin & Ji Ye-eun - Stamp their faces with an ink sponge Kim Jong-kook & Kim Ah-young - Cold water splash. Yang Se-chan & Song Ji-hyo - give jjajang ramyeon to single people	
751	May 4, 2025	The More You Shoot, The More You Succeed (찍을수록 성공 궤도)	No guest	Ttuk Kook AI Startup CEOs: (Yoo Jae-suk & Kim Jong-kook); Exciting Math Education Startup CEOs: (Haha & Choi Daniel); Meat Deboning Machine Startup CEOs: (Jee Seok-jin & Yang Se-chan); Shoulder Pad Startup CEOs: (Song Ji-hyo & Ji Ye-eun)	Have the most national heritage stamps to win the race.	The mission was won by Ttuk Kook AI Startup CEOs and Exciting Math Education Startup CEOs. Meat Deboning Machine Startup CEOs and Shoulder Pad Startup CEOs had to get the "get off work" stamp in the middle of Sanjeong Lake before going home as a penalty.	
752 (Note: Kim Jong-kook's Birthday Special.)	May 11, 2025	Killers' Territory Marking (킬러들의 영역표시)	Son Ho-jun; Yoo Seung-ho	Grasshopper Gang: (Yoo Jae-suk, Haha, Song Ji-hyo, Choi Daniel, Yoo Seung-ho); Tiger Gang: (Kim Jong-kook, Jee Seok-jin, Yang Se-chan, Ji Ye-eun, Son Ho-jun)	Have the most territory to avoid penalty.	The Mission was won by Grasshopper Gang. Through the decision of the winning team, Kim Jong Kook was exempted from the penalty. Through game of luck, Jee Seok-jin and Son Ho-jun receive the water gun penalty, while Yang Se-chan and Ji Ye-eun receive the ink water gun penalty.	
Special (Note: This is the first special episode that is not aired on the end of the year.)	May 18, 2025	Running Man Special Example: Life Growth Period (런닝맨스페셜 예는 생활 성장기)	No guest	No teams	Special episode of the show showcasing both Ji Ye-eun and Choi Daniel's journey in Running Man.	N/A	
753 (Note: Children's Day, Teachers' Day & Family Month Special.)	May 25, 2025	The Eye-Catching Running Family (눈치 백단 런닝패밀리)	Miyeon; Soyeon (I-dle)	Wink Mafia: Mission Team (Haha, Jee Seok-jin, Kim Jong-kook, Song Ji-hyo, Yang Se-chan, Ji Ye-eun, Choi Daniel, Miyeon, Soyeon); Mafia (Yoo Jae-suk) Good Thing If You Leave, Bad Thing If You Come Back: Losing Team (Yoo Jae-suk, Kim Jong-kook, Yang Se-chan, Ji Ye-eun, Soyeon); Winning Team (Haha, Jee Seok-jin, Song Ji-hyo, Choi Daniel, Miyeon)	Wink Mafia Mission; Mafia: Eliminate three players and avoid being arrested. Mission Team: Arrest the mafia before being eliminated. Quiz Mission: Guess the correct answers in order to escape to the Answer Zone. Main Mission: Perform required actions with quick-wits to avoid penalty.	The mission was won by Yoo Jae-suk, Haha, Song Ji-hyo, Ji Ye-eun and Soyeon. Through game of luck, Jee Seok-jin, Choi Daniel and Miyeon receive the whipped cream penalty.	
754	June 1, 2025	Let's Vote Spring (투표해 봄)	Lee Seung-hyub (N.Flying); Park Ji-hu	Draw the Last Syllable: Jae-suk Team (Yoo Jae-suk, Kim Jong-kook, Song Ji-hyo, Choi Daniel, Lee Seung-hyub); Seok-jin Team (Jee Seok-jin, Haha, Yang Se-chan, Ji Ye-eun, Park Ji-hu) Pull Out the Tablecloth: Jae-suk Team; Representative (Yoo Jae-suk); Members (Yoo Jae-suk, Jee Seok-jin, Kim Jong-kook, Song Ji-hyo, Park Ji-hu); Haha Team; Representative (Choi Daniel); Members (Haha, Yang Se-chan, Ji Ye-eun, Choi Daniel, Lee Seung-hyub) Running Penalty Debate: Jae-suk Team (Yoo Jae-suk, Haha, Kim Jong-kook, Yang Se-chan, Ji Ye-eun); Seok-jin Team (Jee Seok-jin, Song Ji-hyo, Choi Daniel, Lee Seung-hyub, Park Ji-hu)	Avoid being voted to escape the penalty.	The mission was won by Kim Jong-kook, Song Ji-hyo, Yang Se-chan, Ji Ye-eun and Park Ji-hu. Yoo Jae-suk, Haha, Jee Seok-jin, Choi Daniel and Lee Seung-hyub receive the ink bomb penalty.	
755	June 8, 2025	Road Trips as Drawn (그리는대로드 트립)	No guest	No teams	Successfully complete the outing race before 4 PM using Yoo Jae-suk's drawing.	Mission Accomplished.	
756	June 15, 2025	Veterans In the City (꾼 인 더 시티)	Kim Ah-young	Ji-hyo Team (Song Ji-hyo, Yoo Jae-suk, Jee Seok-jin); Ye-eun Team (Ji Ye-eun, Haha, Kim Jong-kook); Ah-young Team (Kim Ah-young, Yang Se-chan, Choi Daniel)	Obtain the card of things that were first started in Incheon to avoid penalty.	The mission was won by Yoo Jae-suk, Yang Se-chan and Kim Ah-young. Yoo Jae-suk receive the 300 dollars Onnuri gift certificate, while Yang Se-chan receive a bottle of cider and Kim Ah-young receive a Bamboo wife. Penalties: Haha & Song Ji-hyo - drink sophora root tea Jee Seok-jin, Kim Jong-kook & Choi Daniel - Jump rope 15 times while wearing acupressure shoes Ji Ye-eun - Ink face penalty.	
757	June 22, 2025	The Empty Head Avengers Last Competition (최깡벤저스 꼴찌 대전)	No guest	Brainiac Team (Yoo Jae-suk, Haha, Jee Seok-jin, Kim Jong-kook); Empty Head Avengers Team (Song Ji-hyo, Yang Se-chan, Choi Daniel, Ji Ye-eun)	Have the most ice balls or at least 1 ice ball per person to avoid penalty.	The mission was won by Yang Se-chan. Yoo Jae-suk, who was bankrupted after the game had to write a statement of repentance with 5 4-syllable Chinese idioms with Haha and Song Ji-hyo, whose penalty balls are drawn after the filming as a penalty which will be posted on RM's official Instagram Account.	
758	June 29, 2025	The Miracle Breakfast (미라클 밥모닝)	No guest	No teams	Win the race by completing a line on the bingo card before lunch at 12:30 PM.	Mission failed. Yoo Jae-suk and Haha, whose penalty balls are drawn, had to make breakfast for the members on the next episode's filming as a penalty.	
759 (Note: Horror Special.)	July 6, 2025	Creepy Vacation Thriller (오싹한 바캉스릴러	Ahyeon; Asa (Babymonster); Joo Hyun-young	Pink Team: (Yoo Jae-suk, Song Ji-hyo, Yang Se-chan, Ahyeon); Yellow Team: (Haha, Kim Jong-kook, Ji Ye-eun, Asa); Blue Team: (Jee Seok-jin, Choi Daniel, Joo Hyun-young)	The prize ball was drawn by production team to receive the prize but without penalty ball was drawn to avoid penalty	The mission was won by Haha and Kim Jong-kook. Kim Jong-kook received one and Haha received two hotel buffet coupons respectively but Haha, whose penalty ball was drawn by production team at the same time had to make smoothie for 50 production team staffs with Choi Daniel and Joo Hyun-young, whose penalty balls were drawn as well after the filming as a penalty which will be released on RM's official YouTube channel.	
760 (Note: 15th Anniversary Special.)	July 13, 2025	Back to 2010 (빽 투 더 2010)	Eunhyuk; Kyuhyun; Leeteuk (Super Junior)	Jae-suk Team (Yoo Jae-suk, Haha, Kim Jong-kook, Song Ji-hyo, Eunhyuk); Seok-jin Team (Jee Seok-jin, Yang Se-chan, Ji Ye-eun, Choi Daniel, Kyuhyun, Leeteuk)	Have the most R Coins to win the gold.	The mission was won by Kyuhyun, who selects Kim Jong-kook as the second winner through the Running Man ball. They each received 15th Anniversary gold rings. Through the penalty balls that were drawn, Ji Ye-eun, Eunhyuk and Leeteuk receive the 15th Anniversary whipped cream bomb penalty.	
761 (Note: APEC 2025 Special.)	July 20, 2025	The Splitting Gamblers (쪼개는 승부사)	Miyeon (I-dle)	Correct Answer Hunter; Jae-suk Team (Yoo Jae-suk, Ji Ye-eun, Choi Daniel); Seok-jin Team (Jee Seok-jin, Yang Se-chan, Miyeon); Jong-kook Team (Kim Jong-kook, Haha, Song Ji-hyo); My Useless Superpower; Jae-suk Team (Yoo Jae-suk, Yang Se-chan, Miyeon); Seok-jin Team (Jee Seok-jin, Song Ji-hyo, Choi Daniel); Jong-kook Team (Kim Jong-kook, Haha, Ji Ye-eun); Hold It for Greatness; Ji-hyo Team (Song Ji-hyo, Haha, Yang Se-chan); Ye-eun Team (Ji Ye-eun, Yoo Jae-suk, Choi Daniel); Miyeon Team (Miyeon, Jee Seok-jin, Kim Jong-kook)	Have the intactable shell to win the race.	The mission was won by Yoo Jae-suk. The winner receive the Gyeongju edition of Cheomseongi doll and Silla roof tiles. Through the penalty balls that were chosen by the winner, Jee Seok-jin, Song Ji-hyo and Miyeon receive the finger flick on the nose penalty.	
762 (Note: Ji Ye-eun's Birthday Special.) (Note: Choi Daniel did not attend the first part of the episode due to the filming of his drama.)	July 27, 2025	Happy Ye-eun Day (해피 예은 데이)	Kim Ha-neul; Lee Jun-young; Nam Woo-hyun (Infinite) (Note: Guests appeared during the second half of episode 762 and later episode 763.)	No teams	Buy numerous items for Ji Ye-eun as housewarming party gift for her new house.	Mission Accomplished. Ji Ye-eun receive both tower fan and robot vacuum cleaner as her housewarming party gifts.	
763 (Note: The continuation of second half of episode 762 featuring guests.)	August 3, 2025	The Weak Loyalty Roulette Battle (의리 박약 룰렛대전)	Kim Ha-neul; Lee Jun-young; Nam Woo-hyun (Infinite)	Ha-neul Team (Kim Ha-neul, Yoo Jae-suk, Yang Se-chan); Jun-young Team (Lee Jun-young, Haha, Jee Seok-jin, Song Ji-hyo); Woo-hyun Team (Nam Woo-hyun, Kim Jong-kook, Ji Ye-eun, Choi Daniel)	Avoid your name getting drawn by the roulette to escape the penalty.	The mission was won by Yoo Jae-suk, Haha, Jee Seok-jin, Song Ji-hyo, Yang Se-chan, Ji Ye-eun, Kim Ha-neul & Lee Jun-young. Kim Jong-kook, Choi Daniel and Nam Woo-hyun receive the water bomb penalty.	
764 (Note: Special appearance by Im Woo-il.)	August 10, 2025	2025 Daytime Goblin Room Tour (2025 낮도깨비 방 투어)	No Guests	No teams	Choose between green and pink to win the race.	This mission was won by Yoo Jae-suk, Kim Jong-kook, Song Ji-hyo, Ji Ye-eun and Choi Daniel. The winners, along with Yang Se-chan, who was exempted from the penalty, receive the souvenirs that each member chosen as their prizes. Haha and Jee Seok-jin, who were broke without any R Coins, had to dressed as beggars and eat some emergency crops while discussing on what they did wrong during the race before going home as a penalty. Souvenirs: Yoo Jae-suk - Chiaksan peach Kim Jong-kook - Wando abalone Song Ji-hyo - Sangju dried persimmon Yang Se-chan - Gapyeong pine nuts Ji Ye-eun - Seongju Korean melon Choi Daniel - Gochang watermelon	
765	August 17, 2025	Between Flops and Masterpieces (명작과 망작 사이)	Seo Jang-hoon; Shin Gi-ru; Shindong (Super Junior)	Jae-suk Family; Yoo Jae-suk - Father; Jee Seok-jin - Eldest child Yang Se-chan - Middle child Ji Ye-eun - Youngest child Shin Gi-ru - Daughter-in-law Jong-kook Family; Kim Jong-kook - Father; Haha - Eldest child Song Ji-hyo - Middle child Choi Daniel - Third child Seo Jang-hoon - Youngest child Shindong - Son-in-law	Have the most expensive price of the drawings that were drawn to avoid penalty.	The mission was won by Jong-kook Team with the total price of ₩ 102,000 for their drawings. Haha, Kim Jong-kook and Shindong, who were on the top three, receive the box of fruits as their prize . Jee Seok-jin and Ji Ye-eun, who were on the top two, were exempted from the penalty. Seo Jang-hoon, who only have the total price of ₩1,000 for his drawing, along with Yoo Jae-suk, Yang Se-chan and Shin Gi-ru, receive the face ink penalty.	
766	August 24, 2025	Running Sports University Prize Victory (런닝체대 상품대첩)	Kim Ha-yun; Kim Min-jong	Min-jong Team (Kim Min-jong, Yoo Jae-suk, Jee Seok-jin, Ji Ye-eun, Choi Daniel) Ha-yun Team (Kim Ha-yun, Haha, Kim Jong-kook, Song Ji-hyo, Yang Se-chan)	Win the prizes in the sports competitions to avoid penalty.	The mission was won by Jee Seok-jin, Kim Jong-kook, Ji Ye-eun, Choi Daniel and Kim Ha-yun. They each receive their respective Prizes that they were chosen via prize balls. Yoo Jae-suk, Haha, Yang Se-chan, and Kim Min-jong receive the shoulder throw penalty, with both Yoo Jae-suk and Haha receive the shoulder throw from Kim Min-jong and both Yang Se-chan and Kim Min-jong receive the shoulder throw from Kim Ha-yun. Prizes: Jee Seok-jin - Korean Beef set Kim Jong-kook - Body lotion box set Ji Ye-eun - Summer box set Choi Daniel - Fruit box set Kim Ha-yun - Gold & the Summer box set	
767 (Note: Kim Jong-kook announces his marriage on this episode.) (Note: This episode was originally meant to be intended for Yoo Jae-suk, Haha and Song Ji-hyo's Birthday celebrations, but the plan later was moved to the next week episode after the sudden news announcement of Kim Jong-kook's Marriage.)	August 31, 2025	More spend, more luck! The Lucky Date Strikes (쓸수록 굿럭! 복 터지는 데이트)	Jang Dong-yoon; Kim Ah-young	First Couple Teams; Yoo Jae-suk & Ji Ye-eun; Haha & Song Ji-hyo; Jee Seok-jin & Choi Daniel; Kim Jong-kook & Jang Dong-yoon; Yang Se-chan & Kim Ah-young Second Couple Teams; Yoo Jae-suk & Kim Ah-young; Haha & Song Ji-hyo; Jee Seok-jin & Choi Daniel; Kim Jong-kook & Jang Dong-yoon; Yang Se-chan & Ji Ye-eun	Being on the top three with the most money from lottery tickets to win the race.	The mission was won by Kim Jong-kook, with the total of ₩ 251,000, Choi Daniel with the total of ₩391,000 and Jang Dong-yoon with the total of ₩ 460,000. They each receive a watermelon as their prize. Through the penalty balls that were drawn, Song Ji-hyo, Ji Ye-eun and Kim Ah-young had to make a pair of keychains before going home as a penalty.	
768 (Note: Brief appearance by Ryu Hye-young.) (Note: Jeon So-min was mentioned in this episode in 1 and a half years since her last appearance.) (Note: Yoo Jae-suk, Haha and Song Ji-hyo's birthday were celebrated in this episode.)	September 7, 2025	The Time Prize and Penalty Fighter Attack (타임어택 상범파이터)	No guest	No teams	Opening Mission: Have all members arrived together under 1 hour. Main Mission: Finish every tasks and go home before 4 PM.	Opening Mission Result: Mission Failed. Since all the members failed to arrived together under 1 hour, three of them will receive the penalty. Result: The mission was won by Jee Seok-jin, Song Ji-hyo, Yang Se-chan, Ji Ye-eun and Choi Daniel. Yoo Jae-suk, Haha and Kim Jong-kook, who were failed to go home before 4 PM, had to stir ice cream 100 times to make gelato and celebrate birthday with it before going home as a penalty.	
769	September 14, 2025	Go Straight as You Answer (답한대로 직진)	No guest	No teams	Complete the race before 3:00 PM to avoid penalty.	Mission Accomplished.	
770	September 21, 2025	Holding Back Laughter, Congratulatory Delegation ("꾹" 참고 축하사절단)	Cha Tae-hyun	Bridegroom (Kim Jong-kook) Mission Team (Yoo Jae-suk, Haha, Jee Seok-jin, Song Ji-hyo, Yang Se-chan, Ji Ye-eun, Choi Daniel, Cha Tae-hyun)	Bridegroom's Mission: Have the most chance cards using three words that were chosen to win the race. Mission Team's Mission: Remove several party options to win the race.	There are no winners. Kim Jong-kook was exempted from the penalty. Through the penalty balls that Kim Jong-kook chosen, Yoo Jae-suk, Jee Seok-jin and Song Ji-hyo had to make stitched dried pollocks for Kim Jong-kook as a penalty before going home.	
771	September 28, 2025	Sir, That Salary Goes to The CEO (님아, 그 월급을 주CEO)	Jooheon (Monsta X); Kwon Eun-bi	"Silver Visual Company"; CEO: (Kwon Eun-bi); Employees: (Yoo Jae-suk, Jee Seok-jin, Yang Se-chan) "M F&B Company"; CEO: (Haha); Employees: (Kim Jong-kook, Jooheon) "Try It On Company"; CEO: (Song Ji-hyo); Employees: (Ji Ye-eun, Choi Daniel)	Being on the top five with the highest salaries to win the prize, depending on their ranks and avoid in the lowest five to escape the penalty.	The mission was won by Haha, Song Ji-hyo, Ji Ye-eun, Choi Daniel and Kwon Eun-bi. The CEOs each received 300 dollar Onnuri gift certificates as a prize while Ji Ye-eun received the cooking oil set and Choi Daniel received the fruit gift set. Yoo Jae-suk, Jee Seok-jin, Kim Jong-kook, Yang Se-chan and Jooheon had to drink a bitter tea as a penalty.	
772 (Note: Kim Jong-kook did not attend the filming due to his post-wedding honeymoon.)	October 5, 2025	The King's Crops (대감님의 농작물)	Jun Hyun-moo; Jung Seung-hwan	First Race; Kings: (Yoo Jae-suk, Haha); Slaves: (Jee Seok-jin, Song Ji-hyo, Yang Se-chan, Ji Ye-eun, Choi Daniel, Jun Hyun-moo, Jung Seung-hwan); Jae-suk Team: (Yoo Jae-suk, Song Ji-hyo, Yang Se-chan, Choi Daniel, Jun Hyun-moo); Haha Team: (Haha, Jee Seok-jin, Ji Ye-eun, Jung Seung-hwan) Final Race; Kings: (Yang Se-chan, Jung Seung-hwan); Slaves: (Yoo Jae-suk, Haha, Jee Seok-jin, Song Ji-hyo, Ji Ye-eun, Choi Daniel, Jun Hyun-moo); Seung-hwan Team: (Jung Seung-hwan, Yoo Jae-suk, Haha, Jee Seok-jin, Ji Ye-eun); Se-chan Team: (Yang Se-chan, Song Ji-hyo, Choi Daniel, Jun Hyun-moo)	Have the team with the highest values of the crops to win the races.	The mission was won by Se-chan Team. Song Ji-hyo, Yang Se-chan and Choi Daniel receive the Dried persimmon set as their prize. Ji Ye-eun and Jung Seung-hwan were exempted from the penalty. Yoo Jae-suk, Haha, Jee Seok-jin, who were from the losing team and Jun Hyun-moo, who have the least amount of money, receive the flogging penalty.	
773 (Note: Ji Ye-eun did not attend the filming due to her health issues.)	October 12, 2025	A World Where Only the Average Survives (중간만 사는 세계)	Bang Hyo-rin; Byun Yo-han; Kim Kang-woo; Yang Se-jong	Jae-suk Team: (Yoo Jae-suk, Jee Seok-jin, Yang Se-chan, Bang Hyo-rin, Yang Se-jong) Jong-kook Team: (Kim Jong-kook, Haha, Song Ji-hyo, Choi Daniel, Byun Yo-han, Kim Kang-woo)	Main Mission: Avoid penalty by winning the third place of each team. Side Mission: Collect 70 dollars to avoid additional members for the penalty.	The mission was won by Byun Yo-han and Yang Se-jong. Byun Yo-han receive the swimming suit and swimming goggles set, which he would give it to Haha instead for Haha's daughter, and Yang Se-jong receive a box of donuts as their prize. Yoo Jae-suk, Song Ji-hyo and Kim Kang-woo were exempted from the penalty, along with Haha, who also was exempted from the penalty, after he won the rock-paper-scissors game. Jee Seok-jin, Kim Jong-kook, Yang Se-chan, Choi Daniel and Bang Hyo-rin receive the ink line on the face as penalty. Side Mission Result: Mission failed.	
774	October 19, 2025	Finders Keepers, Gold Hunters (찾으면 임자, 골드 헌터스)	Jeon So-min; Yang Se-hyung	Jae-suk Team: (Yoo Jae-suk, Jee Seok-jin, Yang Se-chan, Jeon So-min) Jong-kook Team: (Kim Jong-kook, Haha, Song Ji-hyo, Choi Daniel, Yang Se-hyung)	Find as many gold coins to win the prize and avoid penalty.	The mission was won by Yoo Jae-suk. The winner receive the gold coins as a prize. Jee Seok-jin, Yang Se-chan and Jeon So-min were exempted from the penalty as Yoo Jae-suk gave them some coins, as well as Yang Se-hyung, who had one coin during the mission. Haha, Kim Jong-kook, Song Ji-hyo and Choi Daniel had to roll forward three times in the mud as a penalty.	
775	October 26, 2025	Time-lapse Photography Crew (시간 찍는 출사단)	Jonathan Yiombi	No teams	Main Mission: Arrive at exactly 3:05 PM at the destination. Side Mission: Be on the top three in the photo contest and win the first place to receive the prize.	Main Mission Result: Mission Accomplished. Since the members successfully arrived at the exact time, they were able to avoid penalty and get off work early. Side Mission Result: The side mission was won by Yoo Jae-suk, Kim Jong-kook and Jonathan Yiombi. Kim Jong-kook, who was the first place in the photo contest, received a box of pears as his prize.	
776 (Note: Ji Ye-eun returned in this episode.)	November 2, 2025	Running Man Weekly Keywords (시간 찍는 출사단)	No guest	No teams	Complete every tasks from the three main keywords to get off work early.	Mission Accomplished.	
777	November 9, 2025	When we gather, it's all good! Autumn Literary Club (모이면장땡! 가을문학회)	Kim Byung-chul; Miyeon (I-dle); Sunmi	Jae-suk Team: (Yoo Jae-suk, Yang Se-chan, Miyeon) Haha Team: (Haha, Ji Ye-eun, Kim Byung-chul) Seok-jin Team: (Jee Seok-jin, Song Ji-hyo, Choi Daniel) Jong-kook Team: (Kim Jong-kook, Sunmi)	Get a jangttaeng by obtaining two maple leaf cards or have the same highest numbered Hwatu Cards to win the race.	The mission was won by Jong-kook Team, who successfully got a jangttaeng from two maple leaf cards that they collected for the first place, and Jae-suk Team, who successfully got the highest numbered Hwatu Card from the quick card pick round for the second place. Kim Jong-kook, Yang Se-chan, Miyeon and Sunmi receive the soy sauce marinated crabs as their prize. Kim Byung-chul was exempted from the penalty. Seok-jin Team, who had the November Bright Hwatu Card, along with Haha and Ji Ye-eun, whom both choose the lowest numbered Hwatu Cards, had to have other members paint the maple leaf on their face as penalty.	
778 (Note: This episode is one of the episodes with the most prizes that were set by the production team.)	November 23, 2025 (Note: This episode was originally scheduled to aired on November 16, 2025, but later was cancelled and moved to November 23, 2025, due to the K-Baseball Series event.)	Dynamite Abandonment (포기는괜히 해서)	Ahn Eun-jin; Kim Mu-jun	Jae-suk Team: (Yoo Jae-suk, Jee Seok-jin, Haha, Choi Daniel, Ahn Eun-jin) Jong-kook Team: (Kim Jong-kook, Song Ji-hyo, Yang Se-chan, Ji Ye-eun, Kim Mu-jun)	Avoid being chosen by the Penalty Balls to win the race.	The mission was won by Yoo Jae-suk, Jee Seok-jin, Ji Ye-eun and Ahn Eun-jin. Haha, Kim Jong-kook, Yang Se-chan, Choi Daniel, Kim Mu-jun, who were chosen via the penalty balls, had to make kimchi with 30 heads of napa cabbage before going home as penalty.	
779 (Note: Ji Ye-eun temporary halt her second half of filming due to her health issues checkup.) (Note: PD Choi Hyung-in did not attend the filming due to unknown reasons.)	November 30, 2025	Isn't this the real deal? (낭마 이 맛 아닙니까~)	Heo Kyung-hwan	No teams	Main Mission: Avoid adding more number of members for the penalty by spending less money from their basic budget. Side Mission (Note: The Production team originally set the number of the member to just 2 people but later change it to 3 people due to the members woke up early than usual.): Being top three to successfully enter the car at the exact 6:00 AM.	Main Mission Result: There are no winners. Yoo Jae-suk and Jee Seok-jin, who were on top 2 for the side mission, were exempted from the penalty. Haha, Song Ji-hyo, Ji Ye-eun, and Heo Kyung-hwan, who were chosen via the penalty roulette, had to shuck 20 kg of oysters before going home as penalty. Side Mission Result: The side mission was won by Yoo Jae-suk, Jee Seok-jin and Choi Daniel, who were successfully goes into the car at the exact 6:00 AM and were able to buy breakfast for the remaining members.	
780 (Note: Ji Ye-eun returned to the filming of the episode after her health issues checkup.)	December 7, 2025	Isn't this the real deal 2~ (낭마 이 맛 아닙니까 2~)	Heo Kyung-hwan	No teams	Main Mission: Avoid adding more number of members for the penalty by spending less money from their basic budget. Side Mission: Being top three to successfully enter the car at the exact 6:00 AM.		
781 (Note: Choi Daniel's last episode as rental member and PD Choi Hyung-in's last episode as main PD.)	December 14, 2025	The Problematic New Members (금쪽같은 막내즈)	Kang Hoon	No teams	Main Members' Mission: Be in the top 2 to win the race. Guest Members' mission: Have the least votes of being problematic member to avoid penalty.	The mission was won by Kang Hoon, who was the only winner, after he successfully use his reflection card to other members who voted him. Kang Hoon receive a box of premium honeycomb honey as his prize. Yoo Jae-suk, Jee Seok-jin, Kim Jong-kook, Song Ji-hyo and Yang Se-chan, who got hit by Kang Hoon's reflection card, along with Choi Daniel, who failed to use his card, received the flogging penalty.	
782 (Note: PD Kang Hyung-seon's first episode as main PD.) (Note: Christmas Special) (Note: Yang Se-chan's Birthday was celebrated in this episode.)	December 21, 2025	May it reach you as a Christmas gift (크리스마스 선물에 닿기를)	No guest	No teams	Successfully guess the gifts that were given to avoid penalty.	The mission was won by Haha and Kim Jong-kook. Yoo Jae-suk, Jee Seok-jin, Song Ji-hyo, Yang Se-chan and Ji Ye-eun received the cold water penalty.	
783 (Note: Year-End Special) (Note: The entire preliminary mission race was revealed to be a prank by the production team)	December 28, 2025	The Year-End Clear out Settlement (상품 털어 연말정산)	No guest	Preliminary Mission Race: Protagonist: (Jee Seok-jin); Running Man Team: (Yoo Jae-suk, Haha, Kim Jong-kook, Song Ji-hyo, Yang Se-chan, Ji Ye-eun) Main Mission Race: (No teams)	Preliminary Missions: Jee Seok-jin's Mission: Eliminate all other members before they successfully obtained boxes with their names on it. Running Man Team's Mission: Fake Mission: Successfully obtained boxes with their name on it before being eliminated. Real Mission: Successfully pranked Jee Seok-jin for the entire race without him noticing. Main Mission: Have the least amount of Tax Prize Badges to avoid penalty.	Preliminary Mission Result: Ji Suk-jin received the benefits for his own advantages after he successfully noticing the prank before eliminating Yoo Jae-suk. Main Mission Result: Main Mission was won by Haha and Song Ji-hyo, who were tied in the first place and were exempted from the penalty. Jee Seok-jin, who had the most Tax Prize Badges, along with Yang Se-chan, who was chosen by the penalty ball, received the cold water penalty.	

== Viewership ==
Running Man : South Korea viewers per episode (thousands)

2025	Episode number												
2025	1	2	3	4	5	6	7	8	9	10	11	12	13
734-746	921	991	983	866	1056	995	1057	1119	1044	880	967	937	958
747-758	955	947	887	901	640	695	780	758	742	869	762	720	–
759-770	800	904	828	1009	779	724	TBD	720	858	768	875	913	–
771-783	921	695	791	794	931	794	702	776	796	845	787	663	740

Source: Audience measurement performed nationwide by Nielsen Media Research.

Average TV viewership ratings
Ep.	Original broadcast date	Average audience share	
Ep.	Original broadcast date	Nielsen Korea	
Ep.	Original broadcast date	Nationwide	Seoul
734	January 5, 2025	4.0% (11th)	4.6% (10th)
735	January 12, 2025	4.3% (12th)	4.8% (9th)
736	January 19, 2025	4.5% (10th)	5.3% (7th)
737	January 26, 2025	3.8% (14th)	4.3% (11th)
738	February 2, 2025	4.6% (12th)	5.0% (9th)
739	February 9, 2025	4.4% (13th)	5.0% (7th)
740	February 16, 2025	4.4% (11th)	4.9% (8th)
741	February 23, 2025	4.9% (9th)	5.6% (6th)
742	March 2, 2025	4.5% (10th)	5.3% (7th)
743	March 9, 2025	3.9% (11th)	4.4% (8th)
744	March 16, 2025	4.3% (10th)	4.7% (9th)
745	March 23, 2025	4.0% (8th)	4.7% (6th)
746	March 30, 2025	3.9% (11th)	4.8% (8th)
747	April 6, 2025	3.8% (12th)	4.4% (10th)
748	April 13, 2025	4.2% (10th)	4.7% (8th)
749	April 20, 2025	3.9% (8th)	4.4% (7th)
750	April 27, 2025	3.9% (9th)	4.5% (7th)
751	May 4, 2025	3.1% (12th)	3.7% (9th)
752	May 11, 2025	3.2% (12th)	3.7% (10th)
Special	May 18, 2025	N/A	N/A
753	May 25, 2025	3.8% (11th)	4.3% (9th)
754	June 1, 2025	3.3% (13th)	3.8% (10th)
755	June 8, 2025	3.3% (14th)	3.8% (12th)
756	June 15, 2025	3.7% (12th)	4.6% (8th)
757	June 22, 2025	3.2% (13th)	3.9% (9th)
758	June 29, 2025	2.9% (15th)	3.6% (12th)
759	July 6, 2025	3.2% (12th)	3.7% (10th)
760	July 13, 2025	3.8% (11th)	4.2% (10th)
761	July 20, 2025	3.3% (12th)	3.6% (8th)
762	July 27, 2025	4.8% (9th)	6.0% (5th)
763	August 3, 2025	3.5% (12th)	4.1% (11th)
764	August 10, 2025	3.5% (14th)	4.0% (10th)
765	August 17, 2025	3.3% (-)	3.9% (-)
766	August 24, 2025	3.0% (14th)	3.6% (12th)
767	August 31, 2025	3.6% (11th)	4.0% (10th)
768	September 7, 2025	3.6% (12th)	3.8% (11th)
769	September 14, 2025	3.9% (10th)	4.4% (7th)
770	September 21, 2025	4.1% (8th)	4.8% (6th)
771	September 28, 2025	4.3% (9th)	4.5% (8th)
772	October 5, 2025	3.1% (13th)	3.5% (10th)
773	October 12, 2025	3.6% (14th)	4.1% (11th)
774	October 19, 2025	3.5% (13th)	4.1% (9th)
775	October 26, 2025	4.1% (11th)	4.6% (6th)
776	November 2, 2025	3.8% (12th)	4.4% (7th)
777	November 9, 2025	3.5% (14th)	4.0% (11th)
778	November 23, 2025	3.5% (12th)	4.0% (9th)
779	November 30, 2025	3.6% (12th)	3.8% (12th)
780	December 7, 2025	3.7% (10th)	3.8% (7th)
781	December 14, 2025	3.6% (13th)	4.0% (10th)
782	December 21, 2025	3.0% (13th)	3.4% (11th)
783	December 28, 2025	3.2% (17th)	3.4% (13th)
In the table above, the blue numbers represent the lowest ratings and the red numbers represent the highest ratings.
