= Choi Kyu-jin (actor) =

South Korean actor

- Born: March 12, 1996 (age 30); South Korea
- Occupation: Actor
- Years active: 2013–present

Korean name
- Hangul: 최규진
- RR: Choe Gyujin
- MR: Ch'oe Kyujin

Choi Kyu-jin (Korean: 최규진; born March 12, 1996) is a South Korean actor. He is best known for his role in the television series Class of Lies and Chip In.

== Career ==
He first appeared on the small screen in 2013 with a minor role in the KBS2 television series Ad Genius Lee Tae-baek.

In 2017, he debuted with a supporting role as Kim Hee-soo in the tvN television series Avengers Social Club.

In 2019, he made his second acting appearance as Shin Yi-kyeom in the tvN television series The Crowned Clown.

In July 2019, he starred in the OCN television series Class of Lies as Lee Gi-hoon, the son of a law firm president who is interested in photography. This marked the second time he acted alongside Jun. The first being in the television series Avengers Social Club.

In November 2019, he starred in the web series Green to my Heart as Cha Soo-hyuk, opposite of Jun Hyo-seong.

In 2020, he made his fifth acting appearance as Yoo Hae-joon in the black comedy mystery MBC television series CHIP-IN (2020), alongside Kim Hye-jun as her cousin and adopted brother who is a law student. He shared about the series, saying, "This has served as an opportunity to learn once again that excessive greed leads to a poor ending. I was grateful to be able to serve as one of the communicators of this message." CHIP-IN aired its final episode on August 13.

== Filmography ==
=== TV series ===
Year	Title	Role	Ref.
2013	Ad Genius Lee Tae-baek	young Lee Tae-baek	
2017	Avengers Social Club	Kim Hee-soo	
2019	The Crowned Clown	Shin Yi-kyeom	
2019	Class of Lies	Lee Gi-hoon	
2020	Chip In	Yoo Hae-joon	

== Awards and nominations ==
Year	Award	Category	Nominated work	Result	Ref.
2020	39th MBC Drama Awards	Best New Actor	Chip In	Nominated	
