= Kim Hye-jun =

South Korean actress (born 1995)

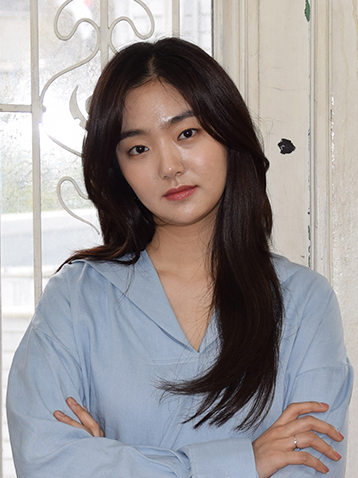
- Kim in 2019
- Born: May 8, 1995 (age 31); Seoul, South Korea
- Education: Hanyang University (Theater and Film)
- Occupation: Actress
- Years active: 2015–present
- Agent: Management MMM

Korean name
- Hangul: 김혜준
- RR: Gim Hyejun
- MR: Kim Hyejun

Kim Hye-jun (Korean: 김혜준; born May 8, 1995) is a South Korean actress. She is best known for her role in Kingdom (2019–2020) as Queen Consort Cho. She won Best New Actress at the 40th Blue Dragon Film Awards for her role in Another Child (2019). She gained further recognition for her role as Song Yi-kyung or 'K' in Inspector Koo (2021) for which she won Best New Actress – Television at the 58th Baeksang Arts Awards the following year. Her other works include Matrimonial Chaos (2018) and Rain or Shine (2017–2018).

== Early life ==
Kim Hye-jun was born on May 8, 1995 at Seoul.

== Career ==
She first appeared in commercials in 2015 and was still studying theater and film at Hanyang University when she debuted in the lesbian romance web series Lily Fever. Determined to go to as many auditions as possible in order to gain experience, she unexpectedly passed one for Saturday Night Live Korea, although she had always considered herself to have no talent for comedy, and so joined the regular cast of the TV show in 2016. Having made her name participating in several popular skits, she left the show at the end of the season in June. She starred in several short movies such as A Transfer Student and appearing as support in a few TV series.

She landed her first role in a feature film in After Spring. In 2018, Kim was cast as one of the main characters in Netflix Original series Kingdom, portraying the unusual character of an ambitious teenage queen who is expecting the heir of the throne. In late 2018, she reunited with Bae Doona in the TV series Matrimonial Chaos, playing Bae's younger sister. Although Kim's acting in Kingdom was criticized by some viewers who would find it inconsistent with the much codified period piece genre, she was praised just a few months later for her performance as one of the leads in Another Child, the directorial debut of Kim Yoon-seok.

In 2020, she got a lead role in the black comedy mystery MBC television series Chip In (2020), alongside Oh Na-ra, in which she won Best New Actress at the 2020 MBC Drama Awards. In 2021, Kim was cast one of the lead roles alongside Lee Young-ae in JTBC produced mystery thriller Inspector Koo, in which Kim portrays a college student who is secretly a ruthless serial killer.

In 2022, she appeared in the Disney+ drama Connect which aired in December.

In April 2024, Kim signed with new agency Management MMM.

== Filmography ==
=== Film ===
Year	Title	Role	Ref.
2018	Her Story	Hye Soo's friend	
2018	After Spring	Hyang Yi	
2019	Another Child	Kwon Joo-ri	
2019	Metamorphosis	Park Sun-woo	
2021	Sinkhole	Hong Eun-joo	

=== Television series ===
Year	Title	Role	Notes	Ref.
2016–2023	Dr. Romantic	Jang Hyun-joo	Season 1 Season 3 – Cameo (episode 16)	
2017	Reunited Worlds	Sung Soo-ji		
2017–2018	Rain or Shine	Lee Jae-young		
2018	Matrimonial Chaos	Kang Ma-ru		
2020	Chip In	Yoo Bit-na		
2021	Inspector Koo	Song Yi-kyung / K		
2026	My Bias, My Boss	Nam Da-reum		

=== Web series ===
Year	Title	Role	Notes	Ref.
2015	Lily Fever	Kim Kyung Ju		
2017	Green Fever	Wan Seon		
2019–2020	Kingdom	Queen Consort Cho	Season 1–2	
2022	Connect	Choi I-rang		
2024-2026	A Shop for Killers	Jung Ji-an		
2025	Cashero	Kim Min-sook		

=== Television shows ===
Year	Title	Role	Notes	Ref.
2016	Saturday Night Live Korea	Cast Member	Season 7	

== Awards and nominations ==
Name of the award ceremony, year presented, category, nominee of the award, and the result of the nomination
Award ceremony	Year	Category	Nominee / Work	Result	Ref.
Asia Model Awards	2021	Rising Star Award	Inspector Koo	Won	
Asian Film Awards	2020	Best Newcomer	Another Child	Nominated	
Baeksang Arts Awards	2020	Best New Actress – Film	Another Child	Nominated	
Baeksang Arts Awards	2022	Best New Actress – Television	Inspector Koo	Won	
Blue Dragon Film Awards	2019	Best New Actress	Another Child	Won	
Blue Dragon Series Awards	2024	Best New Actress	A Shop for Killers	Nominated	
Buil Film Awards	2019	Best New Actress	Another Child	Nominated	
MBC Drama Awards	2020	Excellence Award, Actress in a Monday-Tuesday Miniseries / Short Drama	Chip In	Nominated	
MBC Drama Awards	2020	Best New Actress	Chip In	Won	
