= Lisa Yuskavage =

American artist (born 1962)

- Born: May 16, 1962 (age 63); Philadelphia, Pennsylvania, US
- Education: Tyler School of Art; Yale School of Art
- Known for: Painting
- Website: yuskavage.com

Lisa Yuskavage (/jəˈskævɪdʒ/ yə-SKAV-ij; born 1962) is an American artist who lives and works in New York City. She is known for her figure paintings that challenge conventional understandings of the genre.

== Education ==
Yuskavage was born in 1962 in Philadelphia, Pennsylvania. She attended the Tyler School of Art at Temple University, and studied abroad during her third year through the Tyler School of Art’s program in Rome, before obtaining her BFA in 1984. Yuskavage received her MFA from the Yale School of Art in 1986.

== Work ==
Northview (2000) at the Rubell Museum DC in 2022

Of the artist’s paintings, critic Roberta Smith has written: "The combination of mixed subliminal messages, deliciously artificial color and forthright sexuality is characteristic of Ms. Yuskavage's work, as is the journey from high to low to lower culture within a relatively seamless whole."

Yuskavage cites many diverse inspirations, including Italian painter Giovanni Bellini, Dutch painter Johannes Vermeer, and French painter Edgar Degas.

Bonfire (2013-2015) at the Metropolitan Museum of Art in 2022

Theoretically, her paintings are associated with psychologically driven theories of viewing, such as that of the gaze.

She had a New York exhibit sell out before it opened, and one of her paintings sold at auction for more than $1 million.

Yuskavage's work has been the subject of solo exhibitions at institutions worldwide, including the Institute of Contemporary Art, University of Pennsylvania, Philadelphia (2000); Centre d’Art Contemporain, Geneva (2001); Museo Tamayo Arte Contemporáneo, Mexico City (2006); and The Royal Hibernian Academy, Dublin (organized as part of Dublin Contemporary 2011).

In September 2015, Lisa Yuskavage: The Brood opened at the Rose Art Museum of Brandeis University in Waltham, Massachusetts. This major solo exhibition presented the artist’s work spanning 25 years. Additionally, Yuskavage is featured in the Metropolitan Museum of Art's new online series, The Artist Project, launched in March 2015, in which she discusses Édouard Vuillard’s The Green Interior (1891).

In 2020, The Baltimore Museum of Art and the Aspen Art Museum co-organized a solo presentation of the artist's work, Wilderness, focusing on the ways she has used landscape in her work since the earliest watercolor Tit Heaven series from the 1990s. The exhibition was first shown at the Aspen Art Museum in 2020 and travelled to the Baltimore Museum of Art in spring 2021.

Yuskavage's work was included in the 2022 exhibition Women Painting Women at the Modern Art Museum of Fort Worth.

In 2025, the Morgan Library & Museum exhibited her work in Lisa Yuskavage: Drawings.

== In popular culture ==
Yuskavage's work Half-Family was featured in Season 2, Episode 4 ("Lynch Pin") of the Emmy-nominated Showtime series, The L Word.

Her work is also mentioned in the novel China Rich Girlfriend of the Crazy Rich Asians trilogy by Kevin Kwan.

In Tamara Jenkins' 2018 film Private Life, main characters Rachel (Kathryn Hahn) and Richard (Paul Giamatti) claim to be good friends with Yuskavage, whose artwork, gifted to them as a wedding present, hangs in their living room.

== Awards ==
Yuskavage has been the recipient of honors and awards that include the Aspen Award for Art (2019); Temple University Gallery of Success Award (2005); the Founder's Day Certificate of Honor, Tyler School of the Arts, Philadelphia (2000); the Tiffany Foundation Grant (1996); and the MacDowell Colony Fellowship (1994).

== Notable works in public collections ==
- Helga (1993), San Francisco Museum of Modern Art
- Asspicking, Foodeating, Headshrinking, Socialclimbing, Motherfucking Bad Habits (1996), Rose Art Museum, Waltham, Massachusetts
- Foodeater (1996), from The Bad Habits suite, Yale University Art Gallery, New Haven, Connecticut
- Red Head with Portraits (1996), Weatherspoon Art Museum, Greensboro, North Carolina
- Wrist Corsage (1996), Museum of Modern Art, New York
- Importance of Association II (1997), Denver Art Museum
- Importance of Association IV (1997), Denver Art Museum
- The Bad Habits suite (1996-1998), Buffalo AKG Art Museum, Buffalo, New York; Museum of Modern Art, New York; and Whitney Museum, New York
- Manifest Destiny (1997-1998), Museum of Contemporary Art San Diego
- Night Flowers (1999), Walker Art Center, Minneapolis; and Whitney Museum, New York
- Northview (2000), Museum of Contemporary Art, Los Angeles
- Northview (2000), Rubell Museum, Miami/Washington, D.C.
- Big Northview (2001), Whitney Museum, New York
- Kathy on a Pedestal (2001), Museum of Modern Art, New York; and Seattle Art Museum
- Kathy Thinking (2002), Museum of Modern Art, New York; and Pennsylvania Academy of the Fine Arts, Philadelphia
- Curlie G. (2003), Hirshhorn Museum and Sculpture Garden, Smithsonian Institution, Washington, D.C.
- Lupe & Lola II (2003), Rubell Museum, Miami/Washington, D.C.
- Angel (2004), Art Institute of Chicago
- Kingdom (2006), Museum of Modern Art, New York; and Whitney Museum, New York
- Persimmons (2006), Kunstmuseum Den Haag, The Hague, Netherlands
- Forces (2007), Museum of Fine Arts, Houston; and Museum of Modern Art, New York
- Bonfire (2013-2015), Metropolitan Museum of Art, New York
- Night Classes at the Department of Painting Drawing and Sculpture (2018-2020), Art Institute of Chicago
- Pink Studio (Rendezvous) (2021), Museum of Modern Art, New York

== Publications ==
- Lisa Yuskavage. Texts by Ariel Levy, Barry Schwabsky, and Lena Dunham. Published by Phaidon, London and New York, 2025. ISBN 9781837291205
- Lisa Yuskavage: Wilderness. Text by Christopher Bedford, Helen Molesworth, and Heidi Zuckerman. Conversation with Mary Weatherford. Published by Gregory R. Mill & Co, 2020. ISBN 9781941366271
- Lisa Yuskavage: Babie Brood / Small Paintings, 1985-2018. Text by Jarrett Earnest. Foreword by Hanna Schouwink. Published by David Zwirner Books, New York, 2019. ISBN 9781644230145
- Lisa Yuskavage: The Brood, Paintings 1991-2015. Texts by Christopher Bedford, Suzanne Hudson, Catherine Lord, Siddhartha Mukherjee, and Katy Siegel. Published by Skira Rizzoli, New York, 2015. ISBN 9780847846481
- Lisa Yuskavage. Published by David Zwirner, New York, 2006. ISBN 0976913658
- Lisa Yuskavage. Texts by Tobias Ostrander and Christian Viveros-Fauné. Published by Museo Tamayo Arte Contemporáneo, Mexico City, 2006. ISBN 9789685979146
- Lisa Yuskavage: Small Paintings 1993-2004. Text by Tamara Jenkins. Published by Abrams Books, New York, 2004. ISBN 9780810949577
- Lisa Yuskavage. Texts by Claudia Gould, Marcia B. Hall, and Katy Siegel. Published by the Institute of Contemporary Art, University of Pennsylvania, Philadelphia, 1999. ISBN 0884540979
- Lisa Yuskavage. Texts by Chuck Close and Faye Hirsch. Published by Smart Art Press, Santa Monica, California, 1996. ISBN 9780964642652
