= Crazy Rich Asians (disambiguation) =

Crazy Rich Asians is a 2018 film adaptation, directed by Jon M. Chu, of the original 2013 novel by Kevin Kwan.

Crazy Rich Asians may also refer to:

- Crazy Rich Asians (novel), a 2013 romantic comedy novel by Kevin Kwan, adapted into the 2018 film
  - Crazy Rich Asians (franchise), fictional universe created by Kevin Kwan in the eponymous first work, a 2013 novel
- Crazy Rich Asians (soundtrack), 2018 film soundtrack album and film score album by Brian Tyler
