= Crazy Rich Asians (franchise) =

Media franchise

- Created by: Kevin Kwan
- Original work: Crazy Rich Asians (2013)
- Years: 2013–present

Print publications
- Novel(s): Crazy Rich Asians (2013); China Rich Girlfriend (2015); Rich People Problems (2017)

Films and television
- Film(s): Crazy Rich Asians (2018)

Audio
- Soundtrack(s): Crazy Rich Asians

The Crazy Rich Asians media franchise is a novel and film series created by Singaporean-American author Kevin Kwan. The franchise was established with the publication of the novel Crazy Rich Asians in 2013, which was inspired by Kwan's childhood in Singapore. Crazy Rich Asians was followed by the novels China Rich Girlfriend (2015) and Rich People Problems (2017), as well as the 2018 film Crazy Rich Asians.

The Crazy Rich Asians novels received positive reviews, became both a national and an international bestseller, and has been translated into over 30 languages. In 2013, Hunger Games producer Nina Jacobson secured film rights to Crazy Rich Asians. The film was released in the United States on August 15, 2018. Kwan sold the rights to the film for $1 and served as executive producer on the film with near total creative control, one of the conditions to selling the rights. The film was the first major Hollywood film with a majority ethnic Asian cast telling a contemporary Asian-American story since 1993's The Joy Luck Club.

Kwan published China Rich Girlfriend in June 2015 and became an international bestseller. On August 15, 2018, it was reported that Kwan had already been tasked with developing a film from the sequel China Rich Girlfriend. On April 29, 2019, CNBC reported the back-to-back filming of two sequels to Crazy Rich Asians set for filming in 2020. As of March 2025, the studio owning rights to the sequels, Warner Bros., was still considering scripts for the movie.

== Novels ==
- Crazy Rich Asians (2013)
- China Rich Girlfriend (2015)
- Rich People Problems (2017)

== Films ==
| Film | U.S. release date | Director | Screenwriter(s) | Producer(s) |
|---|---|---|---|---|
| Crazy Rich Asians | August 15, 2018 | Jon M. Chu | Peter Chiarelli and Adele Lim | Nina Jacobson, Brad Simpson and John Penotti |

The first film of the trilogy opened in 2018 as a popular and profitable success. Elle magazine reported in June 2024 that plans for a Warner Bros production of Crazy Rich Asians 2 are underway, stating that: "Amy Wang, who was the story editor on The Brothers Sun and worked on From Scratch, is writing the sequel script, Deadline reported in 2022." In April 2024, via an issue of Production Weekly, it was announced that filming for Crazy Rich Asians 2 would start at the beginning of 2025. However, in March 2025, Jon M. Chu was attached to a television series adaptation of the franchise for HBO Max, saying, "We developed the movie over and over and over again and we're still working on a version of something that I won't talk about now".

== Television series ==
In October 2026, HBO announced an original series based off and continuing the narrative from the movie. Confirmed to reprise their roles are Constance Wu, Henry Golding, Ronny Chieng, and Michelle Yeoh. Production is slated to begin in 2027.

== Soundtracks ==
| Title | U.S. release date | Composed by | Length | Label |
|---|---|---|---|---|
| Crazy Rich Asians: Original Motion Picture Soundtrack | August 10, 2018 | Various artists | 45:20 | WaterTower Music |
| Crazy Rich Asians: Original Motion Picture Score | August 10, 2018 | Brian Tyler | 1:03:39 | WaterTower Music |

== Cast and characters ==
| Character | Film | Television series |
| Character | Crazy Rich Asians | Crazy Rich Asians |
|---|---|---|
| Rachel Chu | Constance Wu | Constance Wu |
| Nicholas "Nick" Young | Henry Golding | Henry Golding |
| Eleanor Sung-Young | Michelle Yeoh | Michelle Yeoh |
| Astrid Leong-Teo | Gemma Chan | |
| Edison "Eddie" Cheng | Ronny Chieng | Ronny Chieng |
| Charlie Wu | Harry Shum Jr. | |
| Kitty Pong | Fiona Xie | |
| Goh Peik Lin | Awkwafina | |

== See also ==
- Suzie Wong (franchise)
