= Last Tang Standing =

2020 novel by Lauren Ho

- First edition cover
- Author: Lauren Ho
- Language: English
- Genre: Fiction, Romance
- Publisher: G. P. Putnam's Sons
- Publication date: 9 June 2020
- Publication place: Singapore
- Media type: Print (paperback)
- ISBN: 0593187814

Last Tang Standing is a 2020 debut novel by Malaysian-born author Lauren Ho, who is based in Singapore. The book follows a successful woman in her 30s who becomes the last unmarried member of her generation in her family. Parts of the novel are inspired by Ho's experiences working at a law firm.

== Reception ==
Kirkus Reviews described the novel as "a lush portrayal of Singapore life filled with vibrant characters and a lovable leading lady readers will root for."

Publishers Weekly wrote: "Ho's cute, quippy love story is sure to captivate rom-com fans."

Aleni Moore of Booklist called the novel "charming and witty," recommending it to fans of The Hating Game, Crazy Rich Asians, and "young professional women at a crossroads".

Susan Blumberg-Kason of the Asian Review of Books noted that the book "employs the same formula as the Bridget Jones books, but updated for a globalized 21st century by celebrating multiculturalism and delving into serious subjects like filial piety and intermarriage."

== See also ==
- Lucie Yi Is Not a Romantic - 2022 novel by Ho
- Bite Me, Royce Taslim - 2024 novel by Ho
