= Victoria Loke =

21st-century Singaporean actress

- Born: 11 February 1992 (age 34); Singapore
- Education: New York University
- Occupations: Actress, model

Victoria Loke (Chinese: 陆詠怡; pinyin: Lù Yǒngyí; Pe̍h-ōe-jī: Lio̍k Éng-î; born 11 February 1992) is a Singaporean actress, activist, and model. She is best known for her role as Fiona Tung-Cheng in the 2018 romantic comedy-drama film Crazy Rich Asians.

== Early life and education ==
Victoria Loke was born and raised in Singapore. She began taking drama and speech classes as a child to overcome shyness. She began training in classical ballet when she was five and Tae Kwon Do when she was eight. She also studied guitar, piano, and percussion.

She moved to New York City to attend New York University's Gallatin School of Individualized Study, studying Asian cognitive decoloniality.

== Career ==
She first appeared in music videos for Talib Kweli, Anthony Cruz, and Natural Elements. She modelled in brand campaigns and commercials for international street-ware labels and website pictorials for Coca-Cola, MTV, Avon, Hypebeast, Swagger New York, RADO LOUNGE, Bastards of Young Indonesia, and Dismagazine.

In an interview with Emily Weiss of Into the Gloss, Loke stated that early in her career she was often cast as a girlfriend of Caucasian male characters in commercials, modelling campaigns, and independent short films and rarely saw Asian women in main roles, instead seeing Asian women portrayed as girlfriends, service attendants, or stewardesses.

In 2014 Loke co-founded #AsianGirl, a collaborative art series focused on dissecting Western hyper-sexualisation of Eastern bodies and challenging reductive stereotypes assigned to Asian womanhood.

After graduating from New York University, Loke moved back to Singapore and auditioned for the role of Kitty Pong in the 2018 film Crazy Rich Asians. She was cast as Fiona Tung-Cheng in Crazy Rich Asians, making her studio-film debut. In September 2018, Loke confirmed that she was signed to portray Fiona Tung-Cheng in the Crazy Rich Asians sequel, China Rich Girlfriend.

In 2018, she began working for the Singapore Committee for UN Women, which focuses on gender equality and female empowerment. She has advocated for the rights of sex workers and domestic workers.

=== Filmography ===
Year	Title	Role	Director	Notes
2017	Un vase à Chinatown	Customer	Jeremy Hung	
2018	Crazy Rich Asians	Fiona Tung-Cheng	Jon M. Chu	
	China Rich Girlfriend	Fiona Tung-Cheng	Jon M. Chu	pre-production
