= Sex and Vanity =

2020 satirical romantic comedy novel by Kevin Kwan

- Author: Kevin Kwan
- Language: English
- Genre: Novel
- Publisher: Doubleday
- Publication date: June 30, 2020
- Publication place: United States
- Media type: Print
- Pages: 368
- ISBN: 9781786091055

Sex and Vanity is a satirical romantic comedy novel written by Kevin Kwan first published in 2020. It is an adaptation of E.M. Forster's A Room With a View. Centered around the romantic life of a teenager, it was written in four months. It was generally well received by literary critics. A film adaptation of the novel is in development.

== Plot ==
Set in Capri, New York, and The Hamptons, the novel details the escapades of Lucie Tang Churchill, a nineteen-year-old biracial New Yorker and descendent of Winston Churchill who is engaged to Baron Cecil Pike while being wooed by Chinese Australian surfer George Zao.

== Development ==
The novel was written by Kevin Kwan, author of the Crazy Rich Asians trilogy. According to Kwan, the title of Sex and Vanity came from a friend's son who had remarked about his generation: "At the end of the day, all that shit is sex and vanity and I want nothing to do with it." Compared to the Crazy Rich Asians series, Sex and Vanity has a smaller cast of characters; Kwan wanted "a much simpler, more intimate story that surrounded one very fascinating young woman."

Kwan wrote Sex and Vanity in four months, from October 2019 to January 2020. Intended to be the first part of a new trilogy, it was released on June 30, 2020, by Penguin Random House.

== Reception ==
The novel received generally positive reviews from literary critics. It was listed by Time as one of the "100 Must-Read Books of 2020". Angela Haupt of The Washington Post described the novel as "vacuous entertainment" and that it was "all style and little substance — unfathomably expensive style, which can be gratifying for those with an appetite for rich-people problems." Francesca Angelini of The Times wrote that it is "a straight-up retelling of A Room With a View", whereas The New York Times reviewer Janet Maslin opined that "Sex and Vanity is what A Room With a View might have been if E. M. Forster’s characters had been micron-deep, Instagram-obsessed and unable to make conversation." Writing for the Asian Review of Books, Susan Blumberg-Kason praised Sex and Vanity for being "a timely story that pokes not too gently at some of society’s less tractable flaws".

== Film adaptation ==
As of July 2020, Sony Pictures has purchased the film rights to Sex and Vanity and the project is in development.
