= Lucie Yi Is Not a Romantic =

2022 romance novel

- Author: Lauren Ho
- Language: English
- Genre: Fiction, Romance
- Publisher: G. P. Putnam's Sons
- Publication date: 21 June 2022
- Media type: Print (paperback)
- ISBN: 0593422279

Lucie Yi Is Not a Romantic is a 2022 novel written by Malaysian-born and Singapore-based author Lauren Ho.

== Reception ==
Kirkus Reviews called the book a "beautiful exploration of both grief and romance starring a lovably hilarious heroine." Publishers Weekly wrote that "Ho hits her stride in this second act, introducing a larger cast and a meatier plot and peeling back her characters’ layers."

Olivia Ho of The Straits Times rated the book 3 stars out of 5.

== See also ==
- Last Tang Standing - Ho's 2020 debut novel
- Bite Me, Royce Taslim - 2024 novel by Ho
