= Bite Me, Royce Taslim =

2024 novel by Lauren Ho

- Author: Lauren Ho
- Language: English
- Genre: Young adult fiction, Romance
- Publisher: Disney-Hyperion
- Publication date: 7 May 2024
- ISBN: 136809564X
- OCLC: 1391119773

Bite Me, Royce Taslim is a novel written by Malaysian author Lauren Ho who is based in Singapore. The novel follows junior sprinter Agnes Chan, who turns to stand-up comedy after an accident ruins her chances at a college scholarship, and her rich arch-nemesis Royce Taslim. The novel is publisher Disney-Hyperion's first to be set in South-East Asia.

== Reception ==
Aaren Tucker of The Bulletin of the Center for Children's Books that readers "will find satisfaction and joy in her journey to grow up and overcome her worst self, along with the expected romcom sparks and witty banter." Publishers Weekly called it "quick-paced and angsty with laughs to spare." Karin Greenberg of the School Library Journal wrote: "Though the trope of rivals-to-lovers is nothing new, it serves its purpose and gives readers a satisfying romance." Kirkus Reviews stated: "Conflicts around class and gender are introduced but not fully resolved, although a strong central romance and a relatable coming-of-age story redeem the narrative."

== See also ==
- Last Tang Standing - Ho's 2020 debut novel
- Lucie Yi Is Not a Romantic - 2022 novel by Ho
