= Rich People Problems =

2017 romantic comedy novel by Kevin Kwan

- Author: Kevin Kwan
- Language: English
- Genre: Novel
- Publisher: Anchor Books
- Publication date: May 23, 2017
- Publication place: America
- Media type: Print
- Pages: 582
- ISBN: 978-0-385-54232-6
- Preceded by: China Rich Girlfriend

Rich People Problems is a 2017 satirical romantic comedy novel by Kevin Kwan. It is the third and final novel in Kwan's "Crazy Rich..." trilogy that looks at the rich and powerful families of Singapore. The plot revolves around the three clans descending upon Shang Su Yi's deathbed to attempt to be included in her will, as she is allegedly extremely wealthy. The novel was preceded by the bestsellers Crazy Rich Asians in 2013 and China Rich Girlfriend in 2015. Two follow-ups to the Crazy Rich Asians film are in development, based on China Rich Girlfriend and Rich People Problems.

== Plot ==
In 2015, two years after the events that take place in China Rich Girlfriend, Nick and Rachel Young (née Chu), an economics professor at New York University (NYU), are happily married and living their life in Manhattan. Nick is informed by his mother Eleanor that his grandmother, Su Yi, has had a heart attack, and that he must come home to reconcile with her before she dies. While Nick wants to make up with his grandmother out of guilt for having shut her out of his life for marrying Rachel (as Su Yi was opposed to the marriage), his mother wants him to make amends so that he will be re-introduced into the will and inherit Tyersall Park, Su Yi's home.

The extended Shang-Young clan has descended upon Tyersall Park to say their last goodbyes with the hopes of getting into Su Yi's good graces and inheriting part of her fortune. Nicholas is initially prevented from seeing Su Yi due to scheming from his cousin, Eddie Cheng, who believes he has a shot at inheriting his grandmother's estate. Eddie lies and convinces the entire family and house staff that Su Yi does not wish to see Nick while she is on her deathbed. With the help of the head of security (who overheard Eddie's plotting), the head maid, and Astrid, Nick is able to sneak into Tyersall Park and speak with his grandmother while she is in a cardiac intensive care unit in her bedroom. She is happy to see him and they make amends. Meanwhile, Astrid, Nick's cousin, becomes engaged again to Charlie Wu. Her relationship with Charlie faces obstacles from Charlie's scorned ex-wife Isabel Wu and Astrid's soon-to-be ex-husband Michael Teo.

Su Yi dies, and everyone prepares for her funeral. After the funeral, Astrid receives a grainy video from Michael depicting her and Charlie having sex in Charlie's bedroom, with a threat of releasing the video unless he is given 5 billion dollars in their divorce settlement. In Su Yi's will, she leaves specific cash legacies to the housekeeper, cook, ladies-in-waiting, chauffeur, and head of security. She leaves shares of Tyersall Park to each of her four daughters (Alexandra, Felicity, Victoria, and Catherine each get 12.5% ) and her son (Phillip, Nick's father gets 30%) along with a share to Nick and his cousin Alistair Cheng (both receive 10%). Upon the reading of the will, Eddie is humiliated to be left with nothing except his grandfather's antique sapphire cuff links. Astrid inherits Su Yi's fashionable dresses and jewelry. Jacqueline, Su Yi's goddaughter, inherits her shares at Ling Holdings, making her a wealthy woman and angering the family, who expected to inherit some of those shares, and now only have Tyersall Park.

Returning to Tyersall Park, Eddie furiously confronts Fiona for humiliating him by not telling him about the contents of the will, and ruining their family's opportunity to live in luxury. Fiona claims that while she signed the paper as a witness, she did not read the contents of the document out of respect for Su Yi's privacy. Eddie ends up curled up in a ball, crying.

The family initially agrees to sell Tyersall Park to Jack Bing, to be used by his new wife Kitty, the former Hong Kong soap actress (and Alistair's former fiancée), for ten billion dollars, as there are no funds to maintain it. Nick cannot bring himself to let Tyersall Park go, and so he attempts to buy out the shares owned by his four aunts, with his father signing over his portion directly to Nick. However, he is not able to raise the money to do this.

Isabel suffers a psychotic breakdown and, in a fit of rage, releases the sex tape of Charlie and Astrid on WeChat, revealing her involvement in helping Michael blackmail Astrid. She attempts to commit suicide and taint Charlie and Astrid's new house by hanging herself from a chandelier. The chandelier breaks, saving her, but she ends up in a coma.

Astrid is shunned by her family and retreats into seclusion, not even telling Charlie where she went. He goes to great lengths to track her down, eventually finding her on an island in the Philippines. He reveals to her that he has gotten Michael to sign off on their divorce without any challenge by threatening to have him prosecuted for blackmail and aiding and abetting Isabel in the illegal surveillance of Astrid. Charlie tells her that although Isabel survived her suicide attempt and is now in a stable condition, her family had found out that she was involved in blackmailing Astrid with Michael and that she will face humiliation of her own as a result. Astrid says that she wants to stay and to bring her son Cassian to live with the people on the island. Charlie is willing to let her have the life she wants, but asks if there is any room for him in it.

Nick takes a trip to visit an elderly Thai prince, based on a note left to him by his grandmother, thinking that this is the key to the funding to buy Tyersall Park. However, he learns that the Prince was his grandmother's first love and Aunt Catherine's biological father. Nick also learns that during World War II, Su Yi aided in the resistance effort against the Japanese occupation of Singapore by providing Tyersall Park as a safe haven for many Chinese and British agents working against the Japanese. Nick then tries to block the sale of Tyersall Park by claiming that it is a historic site. Rachel and Nick bring together Nick's friends Colin and Araminta Khoo, Rachel's friend Goh Peik Lin, and Alistair to buy Tyersall Park and turn it into the Tyersall Museum and Hotel. Kitty completes the deal by becoming a secret investor in their group in order to spite Jack, who had decided to buy Tyersall Park for Colette, instead of Kitty.

One year later, Peik Lin is marrying Alistair, with Nick and Rachel serving as best man and maid of honor. After several years of trying to conceive, Araminta and Colin now have a two-month-old son named Auberon. Eddie finally changes his ways after Fiona gives him an ultimatum: he goes to therapy, or she files for divorce. He decides to go to therapy and now is dealing with his feelings in a more positive manner. Astrid continues to live on the island with Charlie and has started designing her own clothes. She does not wish to get married yet, instead preferring to live "a life of sin" with Charlie, enjoying the fact that this very much annoys her parents. Rachel reveals to Nick that she is six weeks pregnant. They both jokingly agree to not tell Nick's mother about the news, agreeing to wait at least until their child is 21.

== Writing ==
Kwan has said that this book was actually the first he had mapped out when he was first planning his trilogy.

== Characters ==
- Rachel Young (née Chu): Wife of Nick Young. A Chinese-American woman who is an economics professor at New York University.
- Nicholas "Nick" Young: Rachel's husband, who is a history professor, also at New York University. He currently lives with Rachel in New York City but is originally from Singapore and hails from a wealthy and powerful clan.
- Eleanor Young (née Sung): Nick's controlling mother, who schemes for her son to inherit her mother-in-law's great estate, Tyersall Park.
- Astrid Leong: Nick's fashion icon cousin whose reputation is put on the line due to her restarted relationship with her earlier fiancé, Charlie Wu, while she is still married to Michael Teo.
- Goh Peik Lin: Rachel's rich Singaporean best friend from university, who later marries Nick's cousin, Alistair Cheng.
- Araminta Khoo (née Lee): Heiress of the Lee Family and wife of Nick's best friend, the billionaire Colin Khoo, who just had a miscarriage. At the end of the book, she and Colin have a two-month-old child, Auberon.
- Edison "Eddie" Cheng: Nick's cousin who's very eager to inherit Tyersall Park. Eddie is ambitious and wants to prove to everyone who matters that he can live a lavish lifestyle, yet his personal philosophy clashes with his parents, who live a simple and modest life from their wealth. He is later humiliated upon the reading of Su Yi's will, which left him out of the Tyersall Park shares that not only went to his mother, his aunts, and his uncle, but also Nick and Alistair.
- Fiona Cheng (née Tung) : Eddie's wife, who comes from Hong Kong old money. She is one of the witnesses to Shang Su Yi's will.
- Alistair Cheng: Eddie's younger brother who is involved in Hong Kong's movie business. He later marries Rachel's best friend, Peik Lin. Su Yi left him a 10% share in Tyersall Park.
- Tan Sri Harry Leong and Puan Sri Felicity Leong (née Young): The extremely wealthy, powerful, and controlling parents of Astrid, Alexander, Henry Jr., and Peter. They blame Astrid for the sex tape scandal and force her to leave Singapore until it dies down.
- Alexandra "Alix" Cheng (née Young): Mother of Eddie, Alistair, and Cecilia, married to Dr. Malcolm Cheng. Eddie resents Alix and her husband for not flaunting their wealth enough.
- Oliver T'sien: Nick's cousin who also works as Kitty's art consultant and buyer. His family has apparently lost most of their money in the Barings Bank collapse, and he keeps it a secret from his wealthier relatives.
- Cassandra Shang: Nick's gossipy second cousin who seems to know everything about everyone, earning her the nickname "Radio One Asia".
- Jacqueline Ling: Shang Su Yi's youthful goddaughter, daughter of a wealthy, old-moneyed philanthropist and currently the partner of a Norwegian billionaire. She inherits a huge amount of shares at the Ling family's company, which were originally won by Shang Su Yi during a mahjong game, and she is now worth half a billion dollars.
- Kitty Bing (formerly Kitty Tai, née Pong): The new jet-setting wife of one of China's richest men, billionaire Jack Bing. She always feels upstaged by her stepdaughter, Colette, both in her husband's attention and her high society life. Thanks to investing her entire divorce settlement from her previous husband in Amazon, she manages to become the secret investor in Tyersall Park, keeping it from being sold to Jack (and Colette).
- Datin Carol Tai: A devout Christian who is the widow of a corrupt billionaire, the late Dato' Tai Toh Lui. She is on good terms with her former daughter-in-law, Kitty.
- Shang Su Yi, Lady Young: Nick's powerful, dying grandmother who lives on a great estate, Tyersall Park. Nick and Su Yi were very close throughout Nick's childhood, but in Crazy Rich Asians, she forbids him to marry Rachel. He refuses, and this drives a wedge between the two. She later reconciles with Nick.
- Alfred Shang: Shang Su Yi's powerful younger brother who lives on a great estate in Surrey, England.
- Victoria Young: One of Nick's aunts, she is Shang Su Yi's only unmarried daughter.
- M.C. Catherine Aakara (née Young): Nick's aunt who married into Thai royalty. She is the secret love child of Shang Su Yi and a Thai prince.
- Michael Teo: Astrid's scorned soon-to-be ex-husband, a tech billionaire who plots revenge on Astrid by ruining her reputation. After Charlie threatens to expose his blackmail and illegal surveillance to the authorities, Michael finally leaves Astrid alone.
- Charlie Wu: Astrid's tech billionaire ex-boyfriend, later fiancé, who finally gets back together with her, despite their obstacles.
- Isabel Wu (née Lai): Charlie's scorned and mentally ill ex-wife who suddenly shows up in Singapore to ruin Astrid's reputation. She is the one who leaks the sex tape, and later attempts to commit suicide.
- Colette Montagu-Scott, Countess of Palliser (née Bing): Kitty's stepdaughter who seems to have changed a great deal since her video scandal from China Rich Girlfriend. She is now married to environmentalist Lucien Plantagenet Montagu-Scott, Earl of Palliser, who is himself the son of England's fifth-largest landowner, the Duke of Glencora, and a wealthy French noblewoman.
- Jack Bing: Kitty's new billionaire husband, one of the richest men in China. He gives an enormous divorce settlement to his former wife and a trust fund to his daughter, Colette, despite having claimed that he cut her off due to her video scandal, both of which bother Kitty a great deal.
- Carlton Bao: Rachel's sports car-collecting, Cambridge educated, fuerdai half-brother, who dated Colette in the past. He accompanies Rachel to Tyersall Park for Su Yi's funeral. He later begins a relationship with Scheherazade Shang, Nick's second cousin.
- Scheherazade Shang: Alfred Shang's beautiful Eurasian granddaughter, the elder daughter of Sir Leonard Shang and Lady India Heskeith. A student at the Sorbonne, she is also Carlton's new girlfriend. She has been pursued by high-profile men like Prince Harry, but without success.
- Philip Young: Nick's father and Eleanor's husband. Son of Shang Su Yi and Sir James Young; he lives in Sydney, Australia.

== Reception ==
The novel received positive reviews and was noted by USA Today to be "a memorable, laugh-out-loud Asian glitz fest that’s a pure pleasure to read".

== Film adaptation ==
Time reported on August 15, 2018, that Kwan has been tasked with developing the sequel to Crazy Rich Asians from his two follow-up novels including China Rich Girlfriend and Rich People Problems. The planning was still in pre-production concerning the back-to-back filming of both sequels following Crazy Rich Asians as of August 2018, though several of the key actors are committed to other projects until 2020. Awkwafina was interviewed in January 2019 and indicated that there were still no scripts for the sequel and that production filming had not started. According to Town and Country magazine, the filming and premiere of the film is not scheduled to take place until 2020. According to a Slash film journal article, the two sequels, including Rich People Problems, will be shot back-to-back in 2020 once the filming commences.

== See also ==
- Chinese in New York City
- Overseas Chinese
- Chinese Singaporeans
- Crazy Rich Asians (film)
