= Michelle Ong =

Michelle Ong is a Hong Kong jeweller, philanthropist and businesswoman. She is the co-founder and creative director of the jewellery house Carnet.

== Biography ==
Ong was born in Hong Kong to parents who were both medical doctors. She studied sociology at the University of Toronto before returning to Hong Kong. A friend asked her to learn jewellery design and she later went into business with Israeli gem dealer Avi Nagar. The pair launched Carnet, a luxury jewellery brand, in 1985.

Ong has been active in a number of Hong Kong charities, including the Hong Kong Philharmonic Society. In 2010 she founded her own charity, named First Initiative Foundation, which is instrumental in organising local programmes to benefit the arts, education, and community welfare while promoting Hong Kong's culture on a world stage.

== Personal life ==
Ong is married to emeritus Professor David Cheung, famed Cardiothoracic surgery and heir to the Garden Bakery businesses. The couple has three children Adrian, Amanda and Jennifer.
