= Kevin Kwan =

Singaporean novelist

- 关凯文
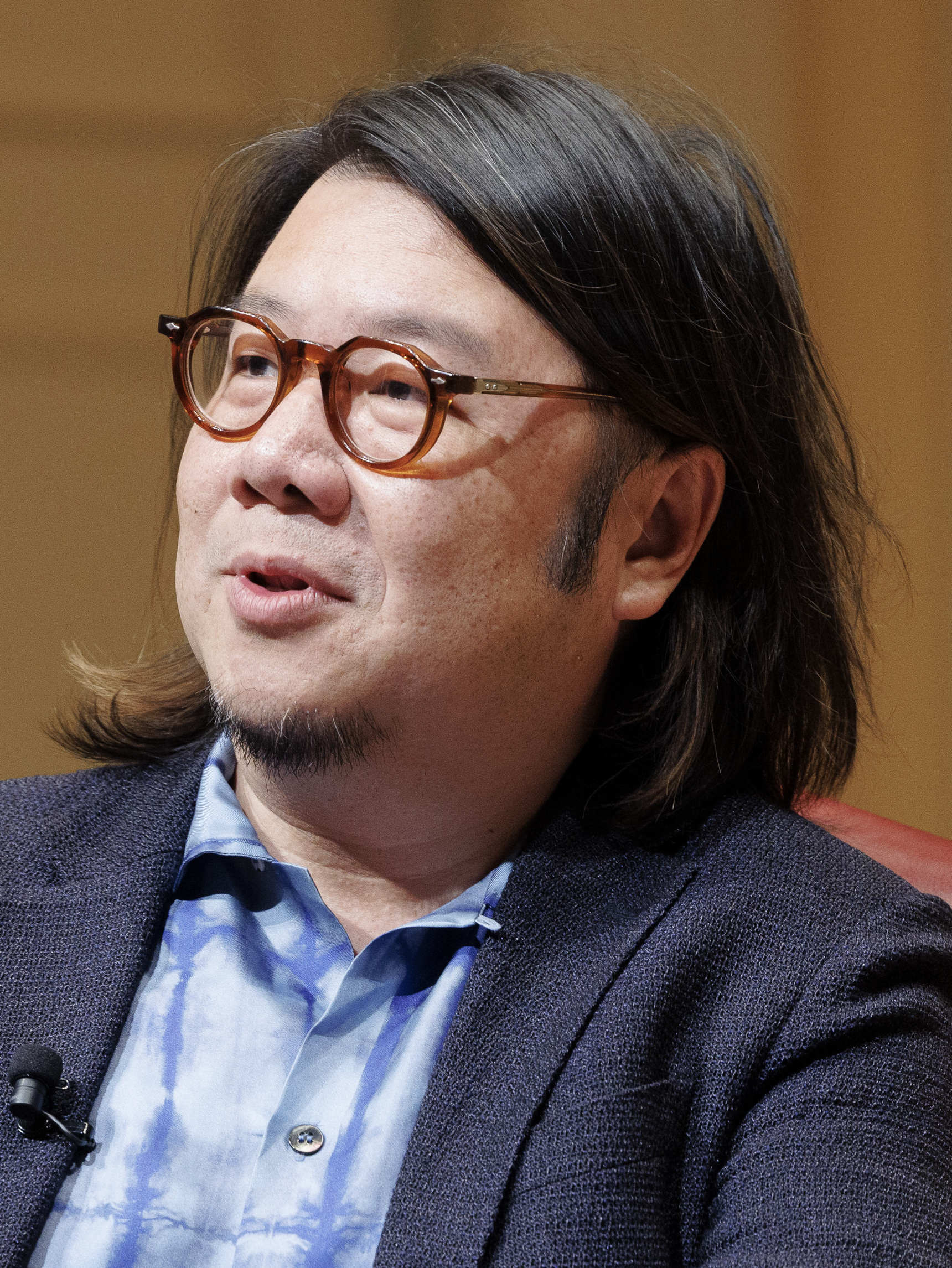
- Kwan in 2024
- Born: 1973 or 1974 (age 51–52); Singapore
- Occupation: Author
- Writing career
- Language: English
- Notable work: Crazy Rich Asians
- Website: kevinkwanbooks.com

Kevin Kwan
- Simplified Chinese: 关凯文
- Traditional Chinese: 關凱文
Transcriptions
Standard Mandarin
- Hanyu Pinyin: Guān Kǎiwén

Kevin Kwan (born 1973 or 1974) is a Singaporean-born American novelist and writer of satirical novels Crazy Rich Asians, China Rich Girlfriend, and Rich People Problems. His latest book, Lies and Weddings, was released in June 2024.

In 2014, Kwan was named as one of the "Five Writers to Watch" on the list of Hollywood's Most Powerful Authors published by The Hollywood Reporter. In 2018, Kwan made Time magazine's list of 100 most influential people and was inducted into The Asian Hall of Fame.

== Early life ==
Kevin Kwan was born in Singapore as the youngest of three boys into an established Chinese Singaporean family. His great-grandfather, Oh Sian Guan, was a founding director of Singapore's oldest bank, the Oversea-Chinese Banking Corporation. His paternal grandfather, Sir Arthur Kwan Pah Chien M.D., was an ophthalmologist who became Singapore's first Western-trained specialist and was knighted by Queen Elizabeth II for his philanthropic efforts.

Sir Arthur's wife, Kwan's paternal grandmother Egan Oh, Lady Kwan, was a prominent debutante who became a socialite after her marriage. Kwan's maternal grandfather, the Rev. Paul Hang Sing Hon, founded the Hinghwa Methodist Church. Kwan is also related to Hong Kong-born American actress Nancy Kwan and former Singaporean finance minister Richard Hu, who was a cousin of his father.

While in Singapore, Kwan studied at the Anglo-Chinese School and lived with his paternal grandparents. Kwan's father and mother, an engineer and pianist respectively, moved the family to the United States when Kwan was 11. The family moved to Clear Lake, Texas, and Kwan attended Clear Lake High School, graduating when he was 16.

He attended San Jacinto College, and the University of Houston-Clear Lake, where he earned a BA in Media Studies, after which he moved to Manhattan to attend Parsons School of Design in order to pursue a BFA in Photography. In New York, Kwan worked for Interview Magazine, Martha Stewart Living, and Tibor Kalman's design firm M&Co. In 2000, Kwan established his own creative studio, clients of which included Ted.com, Museum of Modern Art, and The New York Times.

On August 22, 2018, Singapore's Ministry of Defence stated that Kwan is wanted in Singapore for defaulting on National Service obligation. The Ministry of Defence stated that Kwan had failed to register for National Service in 1990 and did not have a valid exit permit to remain overseas, even though he has been living outside of Singapore since he was 11 years old. In 1994, his application and subsequent appeal to renounce his Singapore citizenship without serving National Service were rejected. Kwan is liable to a fine of up to $10,000 and a jail term of up to three years under the Enlistment Act.

== Career ==
Kwan edited I Was Cuba (featuring photographs collected by Ramiro A. Fernández, published in 2007) and coauthored the book Luck: The Essential Guide with Deborah Aaronson (published in 2008).

[Kevin] Kwan knows that the small, silly parts of being human are our softest spots. And that softness is where we find our deepest humanity ... Kwan doesn't focus on making Asians cool; he focuses on making our stories whole. The bits we're proud of, the bits we try to hide, the tremendous heart that beats underneath it all.

— Constance Wu, Time, 2018

Kwan became inspired to write Crazy Rich Asians in 2009 while caring for his father, who was dying of cancer. Kwan and his father would reminisce about their life in Singapore while driving to and from medical appointments, and Kwan began writing stories to capture those memories. Kwan stated one of his goals was to showcase the "educated families with style and taste that have been quietly going about their lives for generations" which went beyond the typical contemporary coverage of Asia which focused on conspicuous consumption. Friends had been urging him to commit his memories to paper as well. Moving to the United States has westernized his view of Asia, and he likens himself to "an outsider looking in" when describing his life in Singapore.

He has also detailed how big of an impact music has had on his career. In an interview with Spotify he described listening to Fleetwood Mac and Kathleen Smith as he wrote his novels.

=== Crazy Rich Asians ===
Kwan published Crazy Rich Asians in 2013. The book was inspired by his childhood in Singapore; the second chapter more specifically was developed from a poem he had written years before entitled "Singapore Bible Study." Kwan wrote the poem, which describes the study group as "an excuse to gossip and show off new jewelry", for a creative writing course in college. In the process of turning that scene into a chapter of a novel, he was inspired to complete the entire story.

The novel was described as "a sprawling, multi-generational mock epic that centers on a clan of Singaporeans whose various factions gather from their respective lairs around the globe for a wedding that is the year's most talked-about event among the international Chinese aristocracy." Upon publication, it received positive reviews, became both a national and an international bestseller, and has been translated into over 30 languages. In 2013, Hunger Games producer Nina Jacobson secured film rights to Crazy Rich Asians. The film was released in the United States on August 15, 2018. Kwan sold the rights to the film for just $1 and served as executive producer on the film with near total creative control, one of the conditions to selling the rights.

=== China Rich Girlfriend ===
Kwan published the first sequel to Crazy Rich Asians entitled China Rich Girlfriend in June 2015. Similarly to Crazy Rich Asians, China Rich Girlfriend became an international bestseller. On August 15, 2018, it was reported that even before the release of the film adaptation of his first novel, Kwan had already been tasked with developing a film from the sequel China Rich Girlfriend. On April 29, 2019, CNBC reported the back-to-back filming of two sequels to Crazy Rich Asians set for filming in 2020. China Rich Girlfriend, as of April 2019, is currently in pre-production.

=== Rich People Problems ===
Kwan's third and final installment of the Crazy Rich trilogy, titled Rich People Problems, was released in May 2017. On April 29, 2019, CNBC reported the back-to-back filming of two sequels to Crazy Rich Asians set for filming in 2020. Rich People Problems, as of April 2019, is currently in pre-production.

=== Sex and Vanity ===
In June 2020, Kwan's novel Sex and Vanity was published to good reviews, and with mention that this novel is not at all like Crazy Rich Asians. The plot has a structure like that of A Room with a View by E. M. Forster, and major characters have similar names. As of July 2020, Sony Pictures has purchased the film rights and the project is now in development.

=== Other projects ===
In August 2018, Amazon Studios ordered a new drama series from Kwan and STX Entertainment. The unnamed series is set in Hong Kong and follows the "most influential and powerful family" along with their business empire.

In 2024, he published Lies and Weddings.
