= Crazy Rich Asians =

2018 American film by Jon M. Chu

- Theatrical release poster
- Directed by: Jon M. Chu
- Screenplay by: Peter Chiarelli; Adele Lim
- Based on: Crazy Rich Asians by Kevin Kwan
- Produced by: Nina Jacobson; Brad Simpson; John Penotti
- Starring: Constance Wu; Henry Golding; Gemma Chan; Lisa Lu; Awkwafina; Ken Jeong; Michelle Yeoh
- Cinematography: Vanja Černjul
- Edited by: Myron Kerstein
- Music by: Brian Tyler
- Production companies: SK Global; Starlight Culture; Color Force; Ivanhoe Pictures; Electric Somewhere
- Distributed by: Warner Bros. Pictures
- Release dates: August 7, 2018 (TCL Chinese Theatre); August 15, 2018 (United States)
- Running time: 121 minutes
- Country: United States
- Language: English
- Budget: $30 million
- Box office: $239 million

Crazy Rich Asians is a 2018 American romantic comedy drama film directed by Jon M. Chu from a screenplay by Peter Chiarelli and Adele Lim, based on the 2013 novel by Kevin Kwan. The film stars Constance Wu, Henry Golding, Gemma Chan, Lisa Lu, Awkwafina, Ken Jeong, and Michelle Yeoh. It follows a Chinese American professor, Rachel, who travels to Singapore with her boyfriend Nick and is shocked to discover that Nick's family is one of the richest families in Singapore.

The film was announced in August 2012 after the rights to the book were purchased. Many of the cast members signed on in the spring of 2017, and filming took place from April to June of that year in parts of Singapore, Malaysia, and New York City. It is the first film by a major Hollywood studio to feature a majority cast of Chinese descent in a modern setting since The Joy Luck Club in 1993. Despite praise in the United States for its Asian representation, the film also received criticism for casting few actors from Singapore, from Southeast Asia, or of fully ethnically Chinese heritage; for not fully portraying Singapore's multiracial population, and, some said, for perpetuating stereotypes of East Asians.

Crazy Rich Asians premiered on August 7, 2018, at the TCL Chinese Theatre in Los Angeles and was released theatrically in the United States on August 15, 2018, by Warner Bros. Pictures. The film grossed over $238 million against a $30 million budget, making it the highest-grossing romantic comedy of the 2010s, and received praise for the performances of the cast, screenplay, and production design. It received nominations for two Golden Globe Awards (including Best Motion Picture – Musical or Comedy), three NAACP Image Awards (including Outstanding Motion Picture), four Critics' Choice Awards (winning Best Comedy), and a Screen Actors Guild Award for Outstanding Performance by a Cast in a Motion Picture. As of November 2025, two sequels based on the novel's follow-ups China Rich Girlfriend and Rich People Problems have been in and out of development for over seven years.

== Plot ==
NYU economics professor Rachel Chu and her boyfriend Nick Young fly to Singapore for his best friend Colin Khoo and Araminta Lee's wedding. Flying first class, Nick confesses his family is wealthy but insists they will love her. After they arrive, Rachel visits her wealthy college roommate Goh Peik Lin, who reveals that Nick's family is extremely wealthy, have a real estate empire and are essentially Singaporean royalty. Peik Lin helps her pick out an appropriate dress for the event and drives her to the dinner party at the sprawling Young estate. Rachel's first meeting with Nick's mother Eleanor is awkward, as she disapproves of her Americanness, putting her personal passions before family. Nick's only cousin who treats Rachel kindly is his closest, Astrid Teo, whom is married to Michael, a former soldier from a modest background who is starting a tech company. Discovering that Michael is cheating, Astrid is devastated. Rachel fortunately endears herself to Nick's grandmother, matriarch Shang Su Yi.

At their respective extravagant bachelor and bachelorette parties, both Rachel and Nick are warned that the Youngs would never accept Rachel into the family. Rachel leaves her party, only to find a dead fish in her hotel bed, and a message calling her a gold digger. Astrid helps her clean up and comforts her. Nick and Colin swap the noisy, wild party for a quiet beach, where Nick reveals his planned marriage proposal. Although happy for him, Colin reiterates that Nick's union with Rachel would expose her to attacks from Nick's family and community. As Nick and Rachel make dumplings with the Youngs, Rachel admires Eleanor's ring. She reveals she quit law school to marry and start a family. When alone with Rachel, Eleanor reveals that her husband and Nick's father Philip had her engagement ring made when Su Yi refused to give him the family ring for him to propose to Eleanor. She insists Rachel will never be good enough for him or his family.

Rachel is devastated; Peik Lin convinces her to stand up to Eleanor to earn her respect, so Rachel gets a glamorous makeover for the wedding. Meanwhile, en route to the wedding, Astrid confronts Michael, who blames his infidelity on their financial disparity. At the wedding, Rachel confronts and dismisses Amanda, Nick's ex-girlfriend, and impresses others with her stylish gown and her ability to charm an unfriendly aristocrat with her economics knowledge. During the ceremony, Rachel and Nick wordlessly reaffirm their love. At the reception, Eleanor and Su Yi privately confront Rachel and Nick with a private investigator's findings. Rachel's father is not dead, as she believed, but she is the result of an affair. They accuse Rachel of lying to pursue Nick for his wealth and status. He insists they are wrong about her, but Rachel declares she is done with the Youngs. The depressed Rachel returns to Peik Lin's, refusing to talk to Nick or anyone, until her mother Kerry arrives, having been flown in by Nick. She explains that her abusive husband drove her to an old friend for comfort. They fell in love, she became pregnant and fled to the US, fearing her husband would kill them. Nick apologizes to Rachel and proposes, willing to abandon his family to be with her, but Rachel declines. Meanwhile, Astrid moves out with her son Cassian, blaming Michael's insecurities for their marriage's failure.

Rachel invites Eleanor to a mahjong parlor, where she points out that Eleanor has created a stalemate: if Nick gives up Rachel for his family, he might resent Eleanor forever, or he can forsake his family for love. Rachel tells Eleanor she loves Nick too much to force him to choose. Making use of her expertise in game theory, she hands Eleanor the mahjong tile that lets her win and reveals that she could have kept the tile for herself and claimed victory. As Rachel and Kerry board a plane for the US, Nick intercepts them. Declaring his love for Rachel, he proposes with Eleanor's ring, showing they finally have her approval. She accepts, so they stay in Singapore for an engagement party. There, Rachel sees Eleanor, who nods approvingly before leaving. In a mid-credits scene, Astrid looks over at a man standing next to her and smiles, clearly recognizing him. (Note: Played by Harry Shum Jr., the man is unidentified but is credited as Charlie Wu, known in the novel by which the film is based on as Astrid's ex-boyfriend.)

== Cast ==
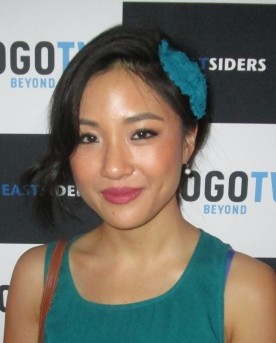
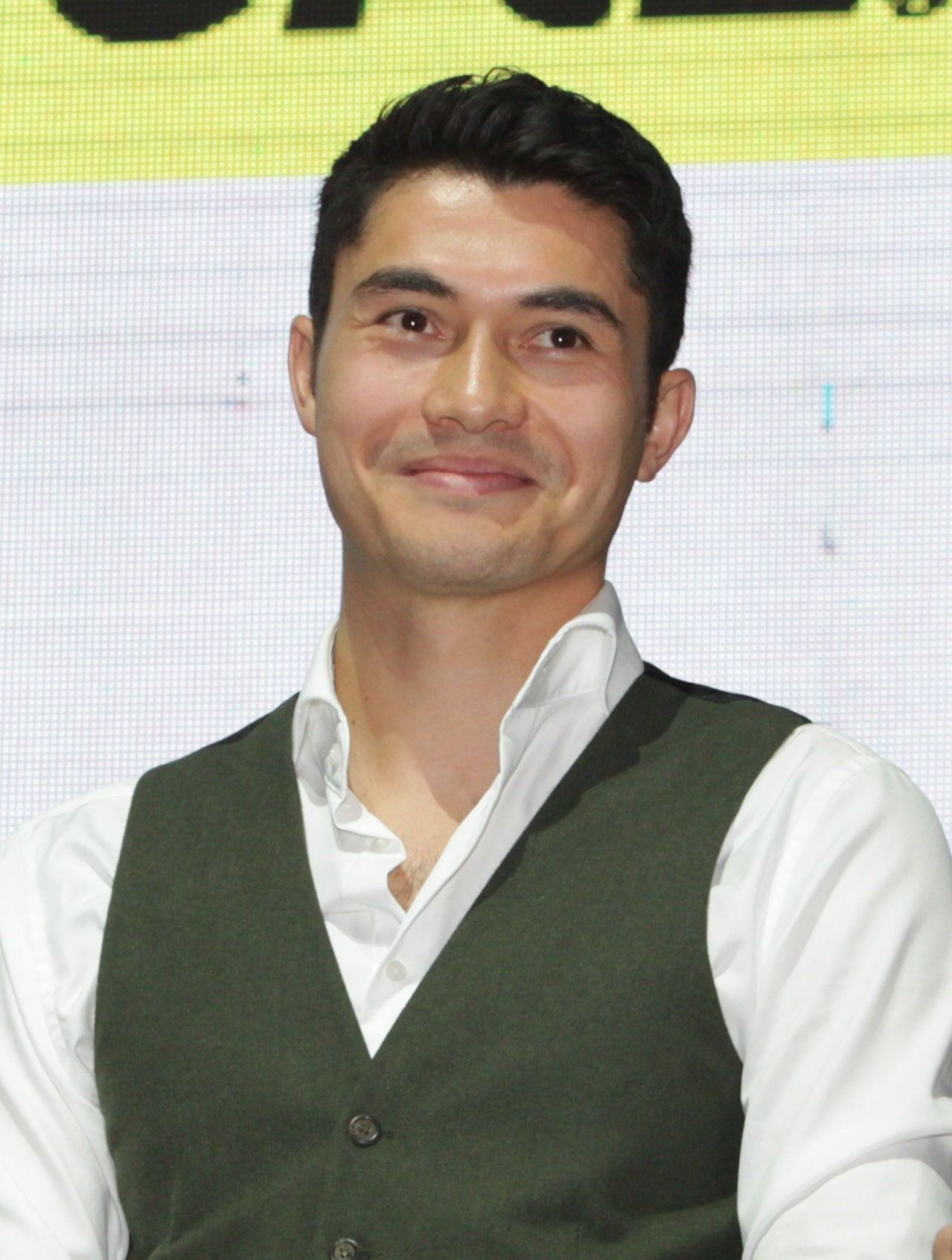
Constance Wu (above) and Henry Golding play the lead characters Rachel Chu and Nick Young, respectively.
- Constance Wu as Rachel Chu, Nick's girlfriend and Kerry's daughter
- Henry Golding as Nicholas "Nick" Young, Rachel's boyfriend and Phillip and Eleanor's son
- Gemma Chan as Astrid Leong-Teo, Nick's cousin and Michael's wife, a fashion icon and socialite (Note: While Astrid's full name is "Astrid Leong-Teo" in the novel, she is listed in the credits of the film as "Astrid Young Teo". Similarly, her mother Felicity's full name has been changed from "Felicity Young-Leong" in the novel to "Felicity Young" in the film.)
- Lisa Lu as Shang Su Yi, Nick's grandmother and the matriarch of the family
- Awkwafina as Goh Peik Lin, Rachel's charismatic confidante and best friend, and Wye Mun's daughter
- Ken Jeong as Goh Wye Mun, Peik Lin's wealthy father
- Michelle Yeoh as Eleanor Sung-Young, Nick's domineering mother and Phillip's wife
- Sonoya Mizuno as Araminta Lee, Colin's fiancée and heiress to a billion-dollar resort chain
- Chris Pang as Colin Khoo, Nick's childhood best friend and Araminta's fiancé
- Jimmy O. Yang as Bernard Tai, Nick and Colin's former classmate
- Ronny Chieng as Edison "Eddie" Cheng, Nick and Astrid's cousin and Fiona's husband from Hong Kong
- Remy Hii as Alistair Cheng, Eddie's brother and Nick and Astrid's movie-making cousin from Taiwan
- Nico Santos as Oliver T'sien, Nick's gay and campy second cousin. He refers to himself as "the rainbow sheep of the family" and becomes good friends with Peik Lin.
- Jing Lusi as Amanda "Mandy" Ling, lawyer and Nick's former girlfriend
- Harry Shum Jr. as Charlie Wu, Astrid's ex-fiancé. He only has a small role in the mid-credits scene, but the director confirmed that the sequel would focus more on him. (Note: Despite only appearing fleetingly in the film's mid-credits scene, Shum Jr. is credited amongst the film's main cast.)

Other cast members include Carmen Soo as Francesca Shaw, Nick's snobby ex-girlfriend; Pierre Png as Michael Teo, Astrid's husband; Fiona Xie as Kitty Pong, Alistair's girlfriend and Taiwanese soap opera star; Victoria Loke as Fiona Tung-Cheng, Eddie's wife from Hong Kong and Nick's cousin-in-law; Janice Koh as Felicity Young, Astrid's mother and Su Yi's eldest child; Amy Cheng as Jacqueline Ling, Mandy's heiress mother and Eleanor's friend; Koh Chieng Mun as Neena Goh, Peik Lin's mother; Calvin Wong as P.T. Goh, Peik Lin's brother; Tan Kheng Hua as Kerry Chu, Rachel's mother; Constance Lau as Celine "Radio One Asia" Lim, gossiper and member of Radio One Asia; Selena Tan as Alexandra "Alix" Young-Cheng, Su Yi's youngest child; Daniel Jenkins as Reginald Ormsby, manager of the London Calthorpe Hotel; Peter Carroll as Lord Calthorpe, owner of the London Calthorpe Hotel; Kris Aquino as Princess Intan, a wealthy royal; Tumurbaatar Enkhtungalag as Nadine Shao, one of Eleanor's best friends; Charles Grounds as Curtis, one of Rachel's friends in New York City.

Crazy Rich Asians author Kevin Kwan has a cameo appearance during the Radio One Asia sequence. Singer Kina Grannis cameos as Colin and Araminta's wedding singer during the wedding sequence.

== Production ==
=== Pre-production ===
Kevin Kwan published his comedic novel Crazy Rich Asians on June 11, 2013. One of the first producers to contact Kwan was Wendi Deng Murdoch, who had read an advance copy of the novel provided by Graydon Carter. Another of the producers who was initially interested in the project proposed whitewashing the role of heroine Rachel Chu by casting a Caucasian actress, prompting Kwan to option the rights to the film for just $1 in exchange for a continuing role for creative and development decisions. In August 2013, producer Nina Jacobson acquired rights to adapt the novel into a film. Jacobson and her partner Brad Simpson intended to produce under their production banner Color Force, with Bryan Unkeless developing the project. Their initial plan was to produce the film adaptation outside the studio system and to structure financing for development and production from Asia and other territories outside the United States. The freedom created by eschewing the typical funding structure would enable an all-Asian cast. Jacobson stated "Getting something in development and even getting some upfront money is an easy way to not ever see your movie get made."

In 2014, the US-based Asian film investment group Ivanhoe Pictures partnered with Jacobson to finance and produce Crazy Rich Asians. John Penotti, president of Ivanhoe, stated "For us, the book fell in our lap kind of like, 'This is why we're doing the company.' Unlike the Hollywood second-guessing, 'Oh my God, will this work? We don't know. It's all Asian,' it was exactly the opposite for us: 'That's exactly why it will work.'"

Screenwriter Peter Chiarelli was hired to write the screenplay before a director was brought on board. Director Jon M. Chu entered negotiations with Color Force and Ivanhoe Pictures in May 2016 to direct the film adaptation. He was hired after giving executives a visual presentation about his experience as a first-generation Asian-American. Chu was actually mentioned obliquely in the source novel as Kwan was friends with Chu's cousin Vivian. Chu mentioned that the #StarringJohnCho movement with John Cho in 2016 pushed him to create Crazy Rich Asians. Upon joining the project, Chu insisted on bringing in a screenwriter of Asian descent, Adele Lim, to review and revise Chiarelli's script. Chiarelli was credited with focusing the plot on the dynamic between Eleanor, Rachel, and Nick. Lim also added specific cultural details and developed Eleanor's character.

In October 2016, Warner Bros. Pictures acquired the distribution rights to the project after what Variety called a "heated" bidding war. Netflix reportedly fervently sought worldwide rights to the project, offering "artistic freedom, a greenlighted trilogy and huge, seven-figure-minimum paydays for each stakeholder, upfront". However, Kwan and Chu selected Warner Bros. for the cultural impact of a wide theatrical release.

Dates are dates, and if those are immovable, I understand. But I would put all of my heart, hope, humor, and courage into the role. What this could do means so much to me. It's why I advocate so much for young Asian-American girls so they might not spend their life feeling small or being commanded to feel grateful to even be at the table.

— Constance Wu, correspondence to Jon M. Chu (2016)

Although she had initially auditioned for the role of Rachel in mid-2016, Constance Wu could not accept due to a conflict with her work on the television series Fresh Off the Boat. However, Wu wrote to Chu explaining her connection with Rachel's character, and convinced him to push back the production schedule by four months. Production was slated to begin in April 2017 in Singapore and Malaysia.

=== Casting ===
After Wu was chosen to play the lead Rachel Chu, newcomer Henry Golding was cast to play the male lead Nick Young. Michelle Yeoh joined the cast as Eleanor Young, Nick's mother, in March 2017. Rounding out the supporting cast was Gemma Chan as Nick's cousin Astrid Young and Sonoya Mizuno as Araminta Lee. Wu, Yeoh, and Chan were part of director Chu's "dream casting sheet" before casting was confirmed, along with Ronny Chieng and Jimmy O. Yang. On April 18, 2017, Filipino actress Kris Aquino was cast in a cameo role. On May 12, it was announced that Ken Jeong had joined the cast. Although Jeong had a minor role involving less than a week of filming, he stated "It's just something I wanted to be part of. It's about wanting to be part of something monumental. Something that's bigger than me. I'm so giddy I'm part of this, I can't even tell you."

The casting of Nick Young, Golding's eventual role, initially had been challenging for the filmmakers, as director Jon M. Chu reportedly was unsatisfied with the preliminary finalists from Los Angeles and China, as he felt that none of the actors could properly replicate the British accent Nick was described as having from the original book. After receiving a tip from his accountant Lisa-Kim Kuan, Chu began actively pursuing Golding for the role of Nick, who he felt had the proper accent and look for the character.

Biscuit Films, a production company based in Petaling Jaya that provided support for the film, commissioned casting director Jerrica Lai to provide local talent which included Carmen Soo (as Francesca Shaw, a socialite) and Calvin Wong (Peik Lin's awkward brother).

The film's casting prior to release was met with both praise—in the U.S. for its all-Asian cast—and criticism for its lack of Asian ethnic diversity, based on issues ranging from non-Chinese actors (Golding and Mizuno) playing Chinese roles; the film's ethnic Chinese and East Asian predominance as being poorly representative of Singapore; and as being a perpetuation of existing Chinese dominance in its media and pop culture.

=== Filming ===
Principal photography began on April 24, 2017, and completed on June 23. The film was shot in various locations around Malaysia as well as in Singapore. The film was shot by Vanja Černjul using Panasonic VariCam PURE cameras equipped with anamorphic lenses. Production design is credited to Nelson Coates.

Producer Tim Coddington contacted Biscuit Films for potential locations in Southeast Asia similar to photographs he had of mansions in Thailand. With Malaysia being a cheap filming location, Biscuit convinced him of the country, which is also culturally more similar to Singapore, where the source novel is set. The ancestral Young family home, set at Tyersall Park in Singapore, was filmed at two abandoned mansions that make up Carcosa Seri Negara within the Perdana Botanical Gardens. Interior scenes were filmed at one building, and the exterior scenes were filmed at another; they had originally been built as residences for the British High Commissioner to Malaya in the early 20th century, and were recently used as a boutique hotel until it closed in 2015. The Carcosa Seri Negara buildings, owned by the Malaysian government, were then abandoned and dilapidated; as found in 2017, they were in disrepair and "filled with monkey feces". The set designers were inspired to decorate the interior set in the Peranakan style. Kevin Kwan, who was born in Singapore and lived with his paternal grandparents before moving to the United States, contributed vintage family photographs for the set. The set designers removed carpets, painted the floors to look like tiles, and commissioned local artists to create murals. The stuffed tiger in the foyer was a simulacrum created from foam and fur in Thailand; customs inspectors delayed the shipment because they thought it was an actual taxidermied animal.

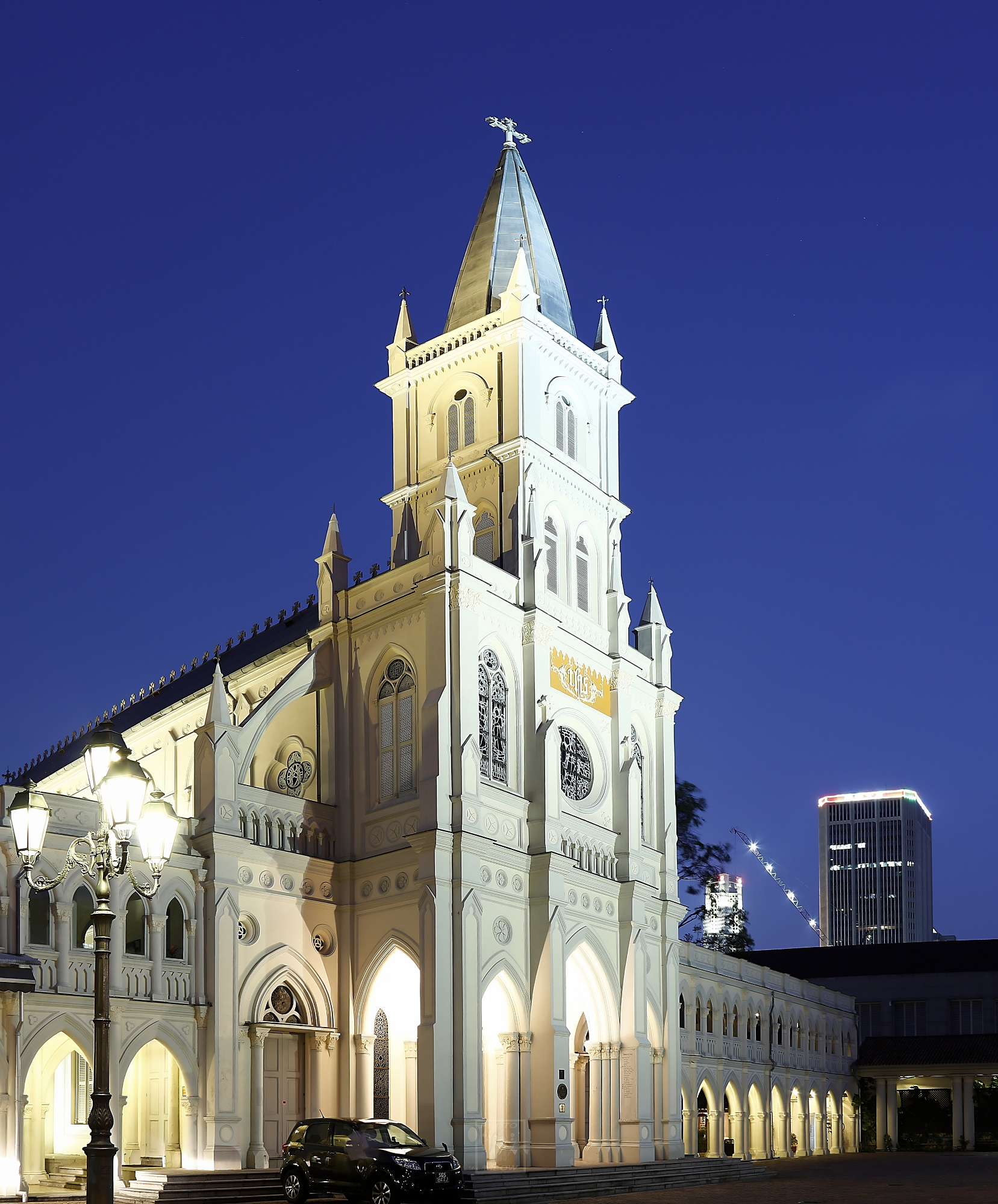
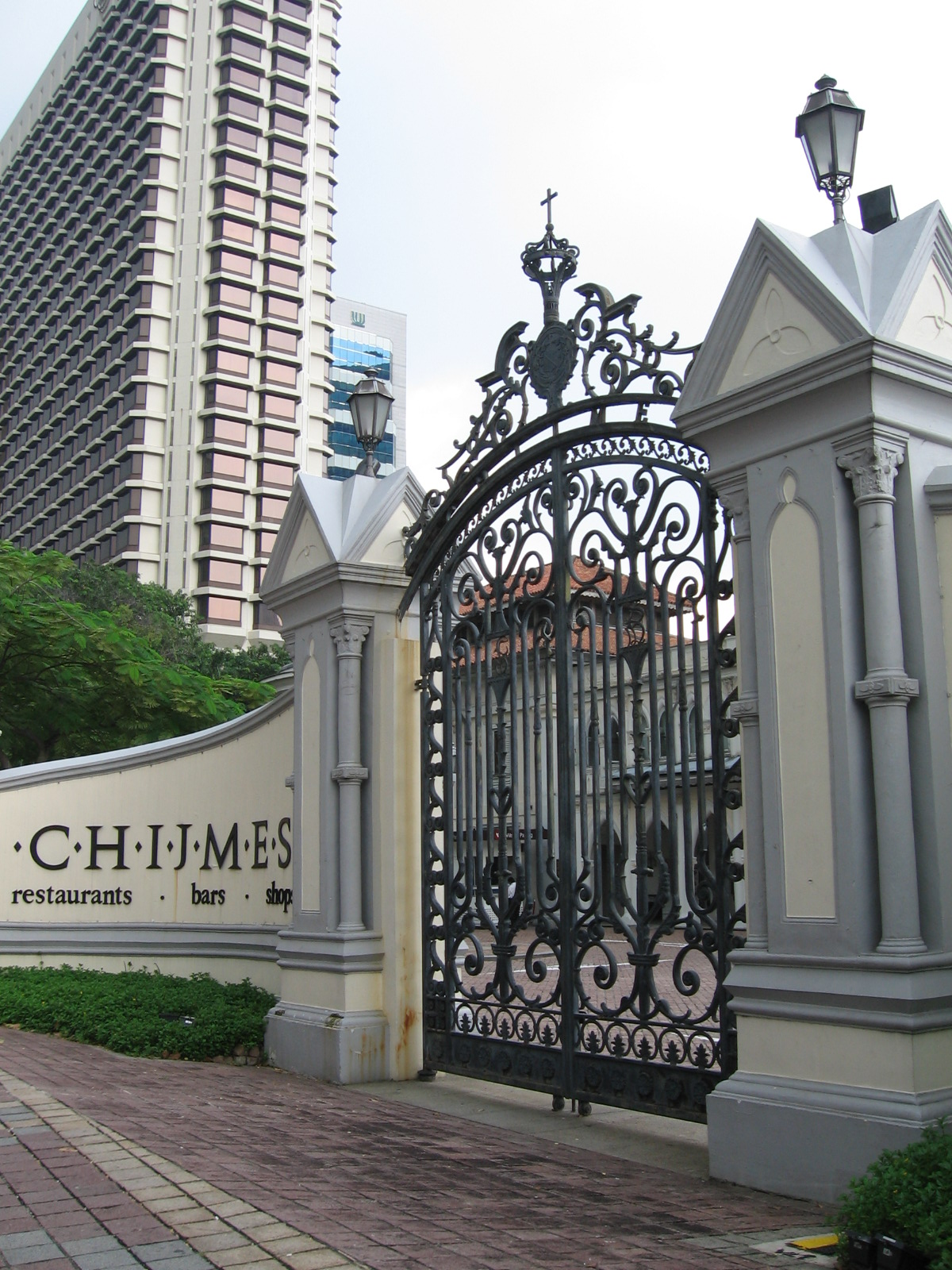
CHIJMES complex in Singapore, where the wedding in the film was held.

The opening urban scenes set in London and the West Village were actually shot in Kuala Lumpur and Penang: the Calthorpe Hotel purchased by the Youngs is the E&O Hotel in Penang; the lecture auditorium set at NYU was filmed in Putrajaya; and the restaurant where Nick asks Rachel to travel was filmed at BLVD House, Naza Towers at Platinum Park in Kuala Lumpur. The taxi drop-off scene set at John F. Kennedy International Airport also was filmed at Kuala Lumpur International Airport. Singapore Airlines was asked to participate in exchange for product placement, but declined as "they were not sure the movie would represent the airline and their customer[s] in a good light", according to producer Brad Simpson, leading to the creation of the fictional Pacific Asean Airlines for the film. After Nick asks Rachel to travel with him to Araminta and Colin's wedding, rumors about his mystery girlfriend soon reach Eleanor at a Bible study session, filmed in the private residence Be-landa House in Kuala Lumpur. The luxurious first-class suite on the Pacific Asean flight was a set built at the MINES International Exhibition & Convention Centre (MIECC) in Serdang. The scenes where Rachel and Nick arrive at Changi Airport and are then whisked away to Newton Food Centre by Colin and Araminta were shot on location. After settling in, Rachel and Nick stay at a luxury hotel (scenes were shot at the Raffles Hotel) instead of the ancestral Young estate at Tyersall. Astrid's character is introduced by showing her shopping for jewelry at an exclusive designer; the shop was created by redecorating the Astor Bar at the St. Regis Hotel in Kuala Lumpur. The Goh family's home is an actual residence off Cluny Park in Singapore, although the set decorators were responsible for the excessive gilding and pillars.

Colin and Nick escape the party barge (the set was built in a parking lot at MIECC, and a container ship was rented for exterior shots) to relax on Rawa Island (scenes filmed on Langkawi Island), and the bachelorette party takes place at the Four Seasons on Langkawi. After Eleanor intimidates Rachel at the dumpling party, she is cheered up by Peik Lin at the restaurant Humpback on Bukit Pasoh Road. The wedding of Araminta and Colin was shot at the CHIJMES, a former convent in Singapore built in the 19th century. After the wedding, the reception is held in the Supertree Grove at Gardens by the Bay. Rachel agrees to meet Nick at Merlion Park (this scene also featured locations filmed at Esplanade Park) before she returns to New York. Eleanor strides through archways in Ann Siang Hill near Singapore's Chinatown before arriving for the mahjong showdown with Rachel, which was filmed at the Cheong Fatt Tze Mansion in Penang, redecorated for the film as a mahjong parlor. Chu wanted that mahjong scene to be "very specifically choreographed", and had hired a mahjong expert to advise on the choreography. Nick's second proposal to Rachel with Eleanor's ring was filmed inside a twin-aisle jet parked at Kuala Lumpur International Airport. After that scene had been fully scripted, storyboarded, and planned to be filmed as a static side-by-side conversation with simple over the shoulder shots, Chu realized the day before that the energy level was all wrong and changed it to a walk and talk improvised on the spot. The film's closing scenes are set at the Marina Bay Sands.

=== Costumes ===
[The Youngs] are really 'old money.' Peik Lin Goh's family are 'new money.' They just made their money and are really enjoying [it]. They're just flinging it around, wanting to show it [off]. The Young family is used to having money, and they are quiet about it. They dress in a more elegant way. Their house looks more like a museum, and it's all very understated.

— Costume designer Mary Vogt on costuming the film (2018)

Costume design was handled by Mary Vogt, with Andrea Wong serving as a consultant and senior costume buyer. They used dresses and suits from fashion designers such as Ralph Lauren, Elie Saab, Dolce & Gabbana, Valentino, and Christian Dior; many of the brands were eager to have their clothes shown off in the film. Looks were influenced by other movies cited by director Jon Chu, including The Wizard of Oz, Cinderella, and In the Mood for Love. 30 makeup artists were on set to help the actors, who were filming scenes in conditions of high heat and humidity while wearing formal clothing.

Before traveling to Southeast Asia, Vogt received help from Kwan, who shared vintage family photographs to explain how the old money society in Singapore "was very classy, very elegant", contrasting with the new money Goh family, who are "just flinging it around, wanting to show it [off]". Andrea Wong pointed Vogt to designers around Kuala Lumpur, who contributed not only clothes but also insight into local high-society fashions. Kwan, who had worked as a design consultant before writing the novel, relied on people he knew working in the fashion industry to bring in clothes for the film.

In an early scene, Astrid gives a watch to her husband Michael; it is a "Paul Newman" Rolex Daytona loaned following a request from Kwan for the filming. Yeoh used her friendships with wealthy Singaporean and Hong Kong tai tais to help shape final wardrobe choices, and loaned pieces from her personal jewelry collection, including the distinctive emerald engagement ring. Kwan and director Chu insisted that all the pieces worn by the Young family must be real; the orchid brooch worn by Su Yi (Ah Ma) at the wedding and a belt buckle for Eleanor (also originally a brooch, but used to make the dress fit Yeoh) were designed by Michelle Ong and loaned from Carnet. Some of the other jewelry pieces, including Astrid's pearl earrings, were loaned from Mouawad, and guards were employed to protect the jewelry, which sometimes dictated the filming. The extras who attended the wedding reception were drawn from the Peranakan Association, a historical society, and were asked to wear their own vintage formal clothing to add local flavor to the party.

=== Music ===
During the production process, Chu and music supervisor Gabe Hilfer assembled a list of hundreds of songs about money, including songs by Kanye West ("Gold Digger"), Hall & Oates ("Rich Girl"), the Notorious B.I.G. ("Mo Money Mo Problems"), Lady Gaga ("Money Honey"), and Barrett Strong ("Money (That's What I Want)"). Seeking to create a multilingual soundtrack, Chu and Hilfer compiled Chinese songs from the 1950s and 1960s by Ge Lan (Grace Chang) and Yao Lee, as well as contemporary songs, then searched through YouTube videos for singers fluent in Mandarin Chinese to provide cover versions of songs. The film's soundtrack album and score album, by Brian Tyler, were both released on August 10, 2018, through WaterTower Music.

== Release ==
=== Theatrical ===
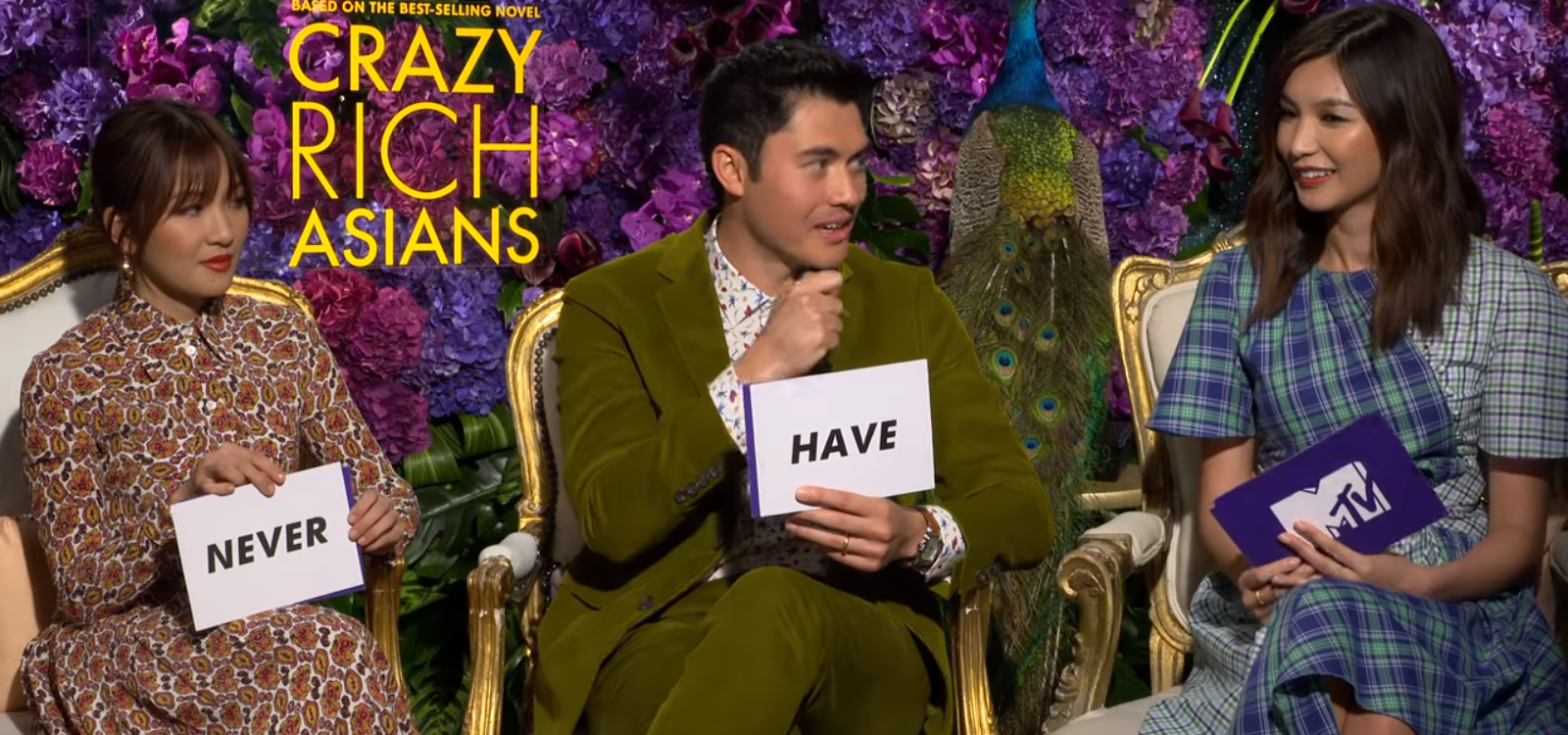

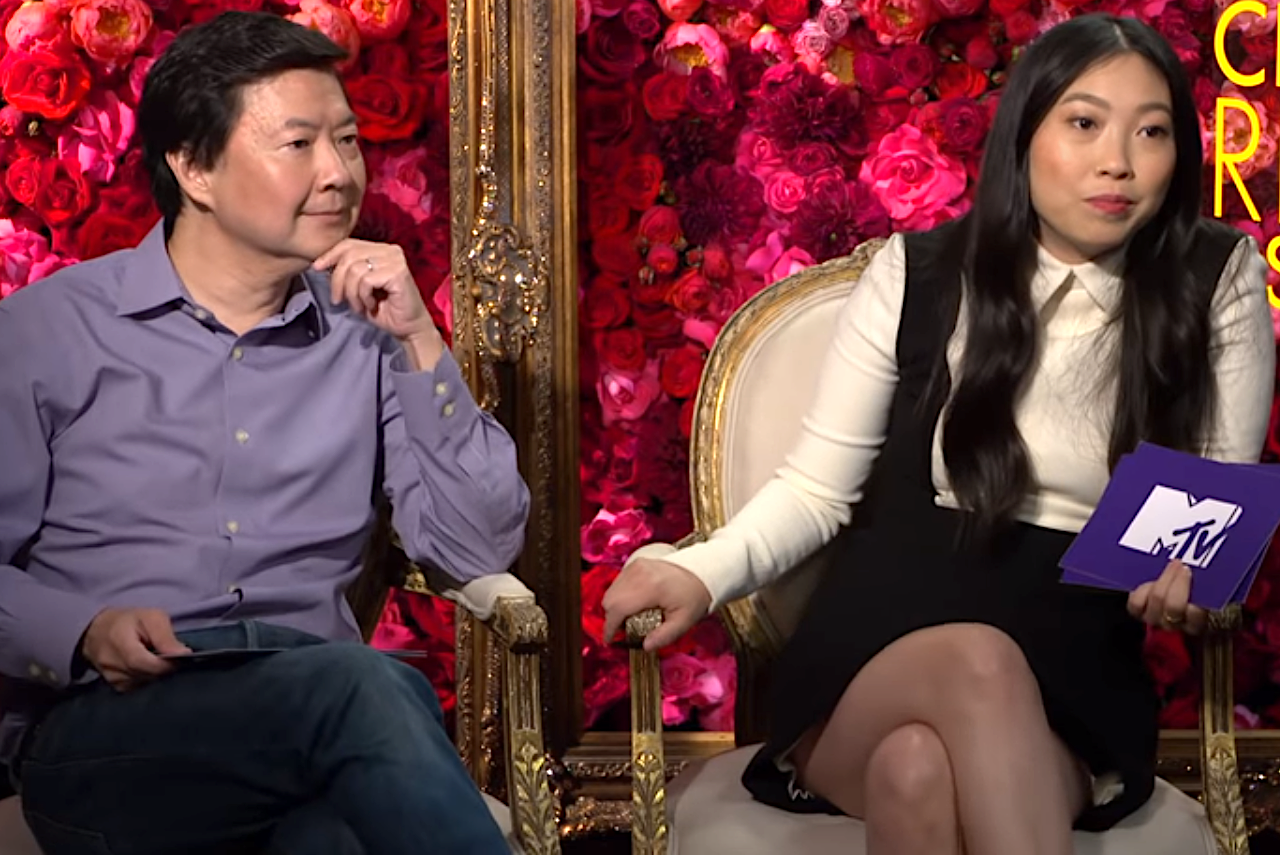
Constance Wu, Henry Golding, and Gemma Chan (above, from left) with Ken Jeong and Awkwafina promoting the film for MTV International.

Crazy Rich Asians was released in the United States on August 15, 2018, after previously having been scheduled for August 17. An early screening was held in April 2018 at the Theatre at Ace Hotel in Los Angeles, garnering strong emotional reactions from the audience; other advance screenings were held in San Francisco, Washington D.C., and New York City. The film premiered on August 7, 2018, at the TCL Chinese Theatre in Los Angeles. The social media hashtag #GoldOpen was used to bring attention to the film. The studio spent an estimated $72.18 million on prints and advertisements for the film.

Internationally, Crazy Rich Asians was released in Singapore on August 22, 2018, and was scheduled for a later release in parts of Europe, although the planned November 2018 U.K. release date was moved forward to September 14, 2018. Later that month, on September 28, 2018, Crazy Rich Asians released to 75 theaters in Japan. In October 2018, it was announced the film would be released in China on November 30, 2018. Crazy Rich Asians was originally planned to premiere in every Nordic country in September. However, it was delayed and eventually cancelled in Sweden and Denmark without any particular reason. The Swedish distributor Fox told Kulturnyheterna they do not know why the film did not have a Swedish or Danish premiere, and that the decision was made by Warner Bros. Los Angeles office. Kulturnyheterna has on several occasions tried to get Warner Bros. Los Angeles to comment, but to no avail.

The film was well received by Singaporean audiences, though some felt it overrepresented and dramatized the wealthy families living there. Writers and producers in the British film and television industry expressed a hope that Crazy Rich Asians' positive financial reception would lead to more East Asian representation following the film's release in the United Kingdom as the film contained multiple British actors of East Asian descent acting in the picture.

In China, Crazy Rich Asians was met a tepid reception among viewers despite initial high expectations from Warner Bros. Pictures. Multiple possible reasons were cited for its failure to resonate with Chinese moviegoers. The film's discussion of excessive wealth felt off-putting to audiences due to the start of an economic slowdown, and the film has been compared to the Chinese film Tiny Times by some media in China, and the themes of ethnic and cultural identity were unrelatable and possibly bothersome to viewers. As Ying Zhu puts it, "“The caricature of the nouveau riche as rude and tasteless might actually be an insult to the Chinese who have yet to have the time to accumulate wealth the old-fashioned way—by inheriting it. It would take generations for the crude and boorish new money to evolve into pompous and arrogant old money, however “dignified” such might be. Indeed “the newly minted rich” has become a euphemism in the West in recent years for people from mainland China who line up at luxury boutiques and spend large." Unlike in the film's country of origin, the United States, an all-Asian cast was not considered novel in China, and the film lacked Chinese stars, other than Michelle Yeoh and Lisa Lu. The delayed release of about three-and-a-half months was also said to have hurt ticket sales, as much of the film's potential audience had pirated it or viewed it overseas. Even with its lackluster reception, a Chinese theatrical release was deemed important by producers, as China Rich Girlfriend, the second film in the series, was planned to be partially filmed in Shanghai, potentially as a Chinese co-production.

Tourism to Singapore increased following the release of Crazy Rich Asians, attributed in part to the numerous attractions showcased in the film, such as the Marina Bay Sands and Raffles Hotel. The Singapore Tourism Board partnered with Warner Bros. Pictures during the picture's premiere and contributed to talent and location scouting during production. The 2018 North Korea–United States summit held in Singapore, however, was also said to have increased tourist numbers. Sales of the original novel saw an increase of about 1.5 million copies after the film's theatrical release.

=== Home video ===
Crazy Rich Asians was released on digital on November 6, 2018, and on DVD, Blu-ray and Ultra HD Blu-ray on November 20, 2018. The Blu-ray Combo Pack special features include commentary by director Jon M. Chu and novelist Kwan, a gag reel, and deleted scenes. As of January 27, 2019, roughly twelve weeks after the film's home video release, Crazy Rich Asians grossed an estimated $16 million domestically from 782,390 collective DVD and Blu-ray sales.

== Reception ==
=== Box office ===
Crazy Rich Asians grossed $174.5 million in the United States and Canada, and $64 million internationally for a worldwide gross of $239 million, against a production budget of $30 million. In October 2018, it became the highest-grossing romantic comedy of the last 10 years, and the 6th-highest-grossing ever. Deadline Hollywood calculated the net profit of the film to be $120.8 million, when factoring together all expenses and revenues.

Three weeks before its North American release, Crazy Rich Asians was projected to gross $18–20 million during its five-day opening weekend. By the week of its release, estimates had reached $26–30 million, with Fandango reporting pre-sale tickets were outpacing Girls Trip (which debuted to $31.2 million in July 2017). The film held special advance screenings on August 8, 2018, and made an estimated $450,000–500,000, selling out most of its 354 theaters. It then took in $5 million on its first day and $3.8 million on its second. It went on to gross $26.5 million in its opening weekend, for a five-day total of $35.2 million, finishing first at the box office. 38% of its audience was of Asian descent, which was the highest Asian makeup for a film in U.S. in the previous three years (besting The Foreigner's 18.4% in 2017). In its second weekend the film made $24.8 million, a box office drop of just 6%, which Deadline Hollywood called "unbelievable." The film continued to play well in its third weekend, making $22 million (a drop of just 11% from the previous week) and remaining in first. The film was finally dethroned in its fourth weekend, finishing third behind newcomers The Nun and Peppermint with $13.1 million.

In Singapore, where the film takes place, Crazy Rich Asians grossed over $5 million. The first-week ticket sales for the film, $2.5 million, were considered unusually high. Large numbers of organizations and individuals buying out theaters to host screenings, as well as general interest in seeing how Hollywood portrayed the city-state, were noted as major contributors to the film's high Singaporean box office totals.

On a panel about the future of film for The New York Times on June 23, 2019, director Chu said:

After what I experienced with 'Crazy Rich Asians,' seeing the audience show up, it sort of reinvigorated the idea of going to the movies. That social aspect of sharing a movie with friends and strangers and family, that's such a strong part of our tradition. The success we had would not have been possible any other way.

The film's theatrical release in China was considered unsuccessful, finishing eighth at the box office opening weekend and losing half of its screens from Saturday to Sunday. Initial reports stated that the film failed to pass $1 million opening weekend following a combined $810,000 on Friday and Saturday, but the figure was later updated to a total of $1.2 million.

In South Korea, the film failed at the box office, finishing sixth on its opening weekend and by its second week the film fell to fourteenth place. In total, the film only made a little over $1.1 million there.

=== Critical response ===
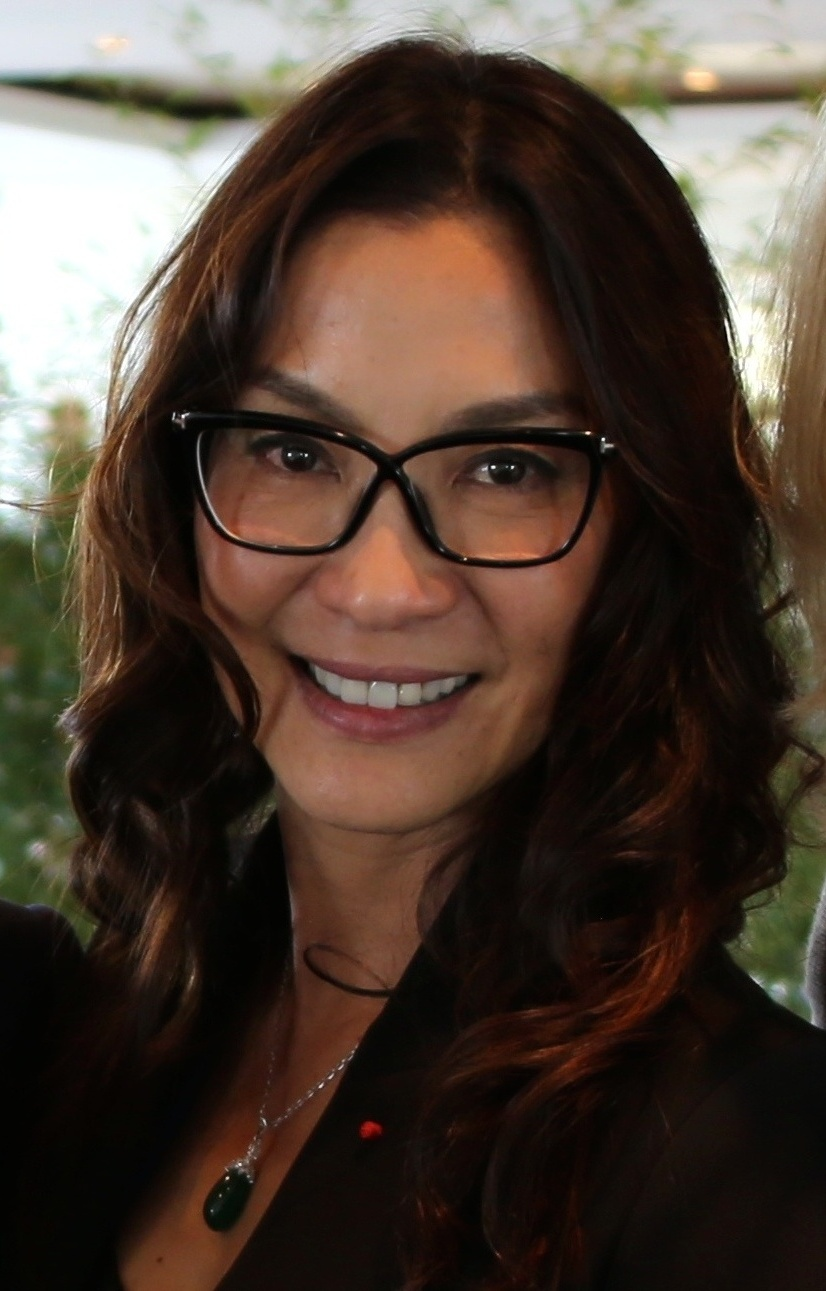
Michelle Yeoh's performance as Eleanor Sung-Young received widespread critical acclaim.

On review aggregation website Rotten Tomatoes, the film holds an approval rating of 91%, based on 373 reviews, with an average rating of 7.7/10. The website's critical consensus reads: "With a terrific cast and a surfeit of visual razzle dazzle, Crazy Rich Asians takes a satisfying step forward for screen representation while deftly drawing inspiration from the classic – and still effective – rom-com formula." On Metacritic, the film has a weighted average score of 74 out of 100, based on 50 critics, indicating "generally favorable" reviews. Audiences polled by CinemaScore gave the film an average grade of "A" on an A+ to F scale, while PostTrak reported filmgoers gave it an 85% positive score and a 65% "definite recommend". On the Chinese social networking website Douban, the film scored 6.2 out of 10, which Variety called a "middling" rating.

Joe Morgenstern, writing for The Wall Street Journal, found the film to be "bright, buoyant, and hilarious," making special note of the large number of quality performances from the cast members, writing: "And anyone with a sense of movie history will be moved by the marvelous Ms. Yeoh, who was so memorable as the love-starved fighter in Crouching Tiger, Hidden Dragon, and by 91-year-old Lisa Lu, who plays Nick's grandmother and the matriarch of his family. Anyone, in this case, means anyone. Crazy Rich Asians includes us all." Ann Hornaday, writing for The Washington Post, deemed the film an "escapist rom-com delight" and remarked that "it will more than satisfy the sweet tooth of romantic comedy fans everywhere who have lately despaired that the frothy, frolicsome genre they adore has been subsumed by raunch and various shades of gray"; she also compared the film's rom-com themes to Four Weddings and a Funeral (1994).

Time magazine published an extended cultural review of the film by Karen Ho, which compared the high fashion appeal of the film to rival the best of previous films such as The Devil Wears Prada (2006). Ho summarizes the film's success as an uphill battle against the season's predominantly superhero oriented audiences, writing: "To many in Hollywood, Crazy Rich Asians might look like a risky bet. It's the first modern story with an all-Asian cast and an Asian-American lead in 25 years; the last Joy Luck Club, was in 1993. It's an earnest romantic comedy in a sea of action and superhero films... In fact, it seems destined to be a hit." In the same magazine, Stephanie Zacharek called the film as "simply great fun, a winsome romantic comedy and an occasionally over-the-top luxury fantasy that never flags," while at the same time hailing the film as a breakthrough in representation and lauded the performances and chemistry of Wu and Golding as well as the supporting performances (particularly Yeoh, Ken Jeong, Nico Santos, and Awkwafina).

Peter Travers of Rolling Stone gave the film four stars out of five; he called it "frothy fun" and a "hilarious, heartfelt blast" while hailing the film as "making history" in its cultural representation in mainstream cinema and highlighting the performances (particularly Yeoh, whose performance he called "layered"). Writing for Chicago Sun-Times, Richard Roeper described the film as a "pure escapist fantasy fun" and "24-karat entertainment" while praising Wu's and Golding's performances and chemistry, and complimented Golding's natural onscreen presence and his good sense of comedic timing. David Sims of The Atlantic lauded the film as a "breath of fresh air" and a "charming throwback" to the classic romantic comedy films while commending Chu's direction, the "hyperactive" screenplay, and the performances of Wu and Yeoh.

Justin Chang in a review for the Los Angeles Times found the film worthy of comparison to other films using an Asian ensemble cast including Memoirs of a Geisha, Letters from Iwo Jima, and The Joy Luck Club. Chang found the supporting cast performance of Yeoh to be exceptional, writing: "You can't help but hang on Eleanor's (Michelle Yeoh's) every word. In a crisp, authoritative, sometimes startlingly vulnerable performance that never lapses into dragon-lady stereotype, Yeoh brilliantly articulates the unique relationship between Asian parents and their children, the intricate chain of love, guilt, devotion and sacrifice that binds them for eternity."

In his review for The New York Times, A. O. Scott indicates that the film's appeal surpasses contemporary social mores dealing with wealth and touches on themes examined in the literature of "endless luxury" over the centuries stating that this is "...part of the film's sly and appealing old-fashionedness. Without betraying any overt nostalgia, Crazy Rich Asians casts a fond eye backward as well as Eastward, conjuring a world defined by hierarchies and prescribed roles in a way that evokes classic novels and films. Its keenest romantic impulse has less to do with Nick and Rachel's rather pedestrian love story than with the allure of endless luxury and dynastic authority. Which I guess is pretty modern after all". Peter Debruge of Variety wrote that the movie "expertly manages to balance the opulence of incalculable wealth with the pragmatic, well-grounded sensibility" of its protagonist; he also drew comparisons of the film's visual style and tone to Baz Luhrmann's The Great Gatsby (2013) as well to the wedding sequence in Mamma Mia! (2008). Robbie Collin of The Telegraph gave the film four stars out of five, and wrote that the film was "a mouthwatering slice of deluxe romcom escapism" and "plays like a Jane Austen novel crossed with a Mr. & Mrs. Smith brochure" while lending his praise on the performances of Wu, Golding, Yeoh, and Awkwafina.

Scott Mendelson, writing for Forbes, found the film to be below average and to have an uneven plot line with contrived humor similar to his opinion of the 2002 film My Big Fat Greek Wedding, writing: "Without having read the book, I might argue that the core flaw of Crazy Rich Asians is that it's so determined to be the Asian-American version of the conventional Hollywood romantic comedy that it becomes a deeply conventional romantic comedy, complete with the bad, the good and the generic tropes. It's well-acted and offers plenty of cultural specificity, but the supporting characters are thin and the need to be universal hobbles its drama."

He was joined in his criticism by Kate Taylor of The Globe and Mail, who wrote: "As the obscenities of wealth accumulate while a large cast of Asian and Eurasian actors render their many silly characters, the source of the laughter becomes troubling." David Rooney of The Hollywood Reporter gave a mixed review, in which he criticized the film's pacing as "uneven" but nevertheless similarly praised the performances and chemistry of Wu and Golding, and singled out Wu's performance as the film's real heart. Tony Wong of Toronto Star argued the film "doesn't blow away stereotypes. It reinforces them. There is little room for subtlety here—the title underlines the mission statement. Asians are rich, vulgar and clueless".

Al Jazeera's Katrina Yu's article on reasons why the film was a box-office flop in China quoted Beijing-based filmmaker Stanley Tsang who described the film as "the Panda Express of Chinese culture". According to Hu Shan, a Beijing-based creative producer and self-described movie buff, the film worked for Westerners who have little knowledge of Asian culture or Asian diaspora who are happy to see their own culture presented in a Hollywood movie. According to popular reviews posted on Chinese movie websites mtime and douban, "Crazy Rich Asians wasn't a celebration of Asian culture – it was a demonisation of it," arguing that the film only shows Chinese culture in the eyes of Westerners and reinforced the cliche stereotypes. Other Chinese cinema lovers criticized the orientalism in the film, pointing out that the character Eleanor, who represented the Chinese tradition in the film, was portrayed as "villainous and backward" and Rachel, who represented the West, won in the end, implying "thanks to the wind from the West, the old and unprogressive East is given a new life".

=== Legacy ===
Actor Ke Huy Quan, who had quit acting after Second Time Around (2002) due to the lack of opportunities for Asian actors, said he was inspired to return to the profession by the positive representation of Asians in Crazy Rich Asians. Quan said: "I saw my fellow Asian actors up on the screen, and I had serious FOMO because I wanted to be up there with them". Among Quan’s first films back would be Everything Everywhere All at Once (2022), which stars Crazy Rich Asians actress Michelle Yeoh as the lead. Both Yeoh and Quan would go on to win Academy Awards for their performances. As a tribute to the film, clips of Yeoh on the red carpet promoting Crazy Rich Asians can be briefly seen in the universe where Yeoh's character Evelyn is an accomplished actress.

Crazy Rich Asians is frequently cited as a milestone for Hollywood films within Asian representation. It was the first major film released in the United States since The Joy Luck Club (1993) to feature an Asian cast. Its success led to a $30 million budget and a profit $230 million for mainstream audience support. The film is often said to have paved the way for movies and TV shows to center on Asian culture, story, and timelines by major studios.

== Casting criticism ==
Although the film has been lauded in the United States for featuring a predominantly Asian cast, it was criticized elsewhere, particularly in Singapore, for casting biracial and non-Chinese actors as ethnically Chinese characters. The film was also criticized by Singaporeans for its inaccuracies by having supposed Singaporean characters speak only British English and American English and omitting Singaporean English entirely. In addition, the film has received criticism for poorly representing the actual ethnic makeup of Singapore by not portraying non-ethnically Chinese citizens such as Malays and Indians.

=== Lead actors ===
The casting of lead actor Henry Golding, who is of Iban and English descent, as the Chinese Singaporean character Nick Young was controversial; several detractors negatively compared the casting to whitewashing and criticized it for perpetuating the idea that Asian actors cannot be Hollywood leading men without Eurocentric features, while supporters highlighted Golding's own Malaysian (Note: Golding's half–Iban ancestry is native to the island of Borneo, which is politically divided among Brunei, Indonesia and Malaysia.) background and upbringing, noting that the criticisms reflected struggles that multiracial Asians face within the Asian community.

Korean American actress Jamie Chung, who had auditioned for a role but was turned down allegedly for not being "ethnically Chinese", responded to Golding's casting with "That is some bullshit. Where do you draw the line to be ethnically conscious?" Chung's remarks were met with both praise and criticism on social media, with some accusing her of being biased against Eurasians and noting that she had previously played ethnic Chinese characters in other works. Chung clarified her comments on social media, denying that she was bigoted against multiracial Asians as she would "one day have [her] own hapa babies", prompting further backlash. Chung subsequently apologized to Golding for her comments, which he accepted. She later expressed her support for Crazy Rich Asians, Golding and his castmates, stating that because of them "there will be other projects [...] that will be full Asian casts."

Golding initially called the criticism towards his casting "quite hurtful", but was later more open towards criticism as he felt that there "should be a conversation about it". Awkwafina jokingly stated it would have been bad only if the producers had cast Emma Stone as Nick, referring to the 2015 film Aloha.

The casting of Sonoya Mizuno, who is of Japanese, English and Argentine descent, as the Chinese Singaporean character Araminta Lee, attracted similar criticisms as Golding's, which Mizuno said "pissed [her] off". Mizuno called out the double standard of white actors being allowed to play different European ethnicities and nationalities without receiving criticism, noting the scarcity of multiracial roles for multiracial actors.

Sociologist Nancy Wang Yuen defended Golding's casting, surmising that the criticism towards him was fueled out of racial purity from full-blooded Asians. By deeming Golding "not Asian enough", detractors were choosing to ignore his Asian heritage. Yuen contrasted Golding's situation to the public perception of former U.S. President Barack Obama, who is also biracial. She noted how "the world sees President Obama as black, but his mother is white" and perceived double standard in "[erasing] Golding's Asian ancestry while obliterating Obama's white ancestry."

Director Jon M. Chu defended his decision to cast Golding, stating that questions about the cast and particularly Golding made him uneasy, later acknowledging:

I realized that I was only getting angry at the people who felt that they had been burned. They were people like me who had watched Hollywood whitewash things, and watched roles go away because someone said an Asian man can't be the lead of this or that.

John Lui, a Singaporean reporter for The Straits Times, criticized the casting, opining that a single drop of Asian blood was enough for Hollywood, who was motivated to cast Golding (an "ethnically ambiguous face") because of his appeal to a wide variety of audiences. Lui disclaimed that his comments were not concerning Golding's identity but rather the objectivity of his looks, stating "it is wrong to sort actors into 'Asian' and 'not Asian enough' piles". Nick Chen of The Independent also spoke negatively about the casting, denouncing Golding's casting as whitewashing gone unnoticed by critics and moviegoers.

In an interview with Teen Vogue in November 2019, actress Brenda Song, who is of Hmong and Thai descent, stated that she was not permitted to audition for Crazy Rich Asians as, according to Song, her "image was basically not Asian enough, in not so many words". Song stated she felt disappointed by the response, questioning why the filmmakers were "fault[ing] [her] for having worked [her] whole life." This alleged response to Song was met with backlash from Asian Americans online, due to Song having portrayed the "original crazy rich Asian" London Tipton in the 2005 Disney Channel series The Suite Life of Zack and Cody. Rachel Chang, writing for Forbes, stated that Song "single-handedly represented Asian Americans to a new generation of [...] impressionable television viewers." Director Jon M. Chu responded to the comments on Twitter, stating that "it sucks if anything of that nature was ever communicated. It's gross actually". He added that he was a fan of Song's work, and would have cast her in the film without an audition if he knew. He later followed up the tweet with an article about the open casting call held for the film, citing it as one of his favorite memories during production.

While promoting his memoir We Were Dreamers: An Immigrant Superhero Origin Story in a May 2022 episode of the podcast How To Fail With Elizabeth Day, Chinese Canadian actor Simu Liu revealed that he auditioned four times for the film but was rejected for allegedly lacking an "'it'" factor", which he said left him "devastated". The podcast renewed the controversy surrounding Golding's casting, with Liu's supporters arguing that he was more appropriate as Nick than Golding as he was fully Chinese like the character, alleging that he was denied a role for having different features. Golding's supporters, many of them of Southeast Asian descent, pointed out that Golding's Iban ancestry of Borneo and Malaysian background made him a better representative of Singapore than Liu, while reiterating the lack of Southeast Asians and overabundance of East Asians (especially those of Chinese descent) in the cast. In an apparent response to the controversy, Liu posted excerpts from his book on Twitter that discussed the incident but provided context. Liu confirmed that the "'it' factor" comments did not come from Chu, whom he befriended after the film's release, but from "a studio exec or a casting director" that got muddled when passed down through a number of people involved in production before reaching Liu's agent. Liu noted that Golding had already been cast as Nick when he auditioned and that he auditioned for the roles of Colin Khoo and Michael Teo, which ultimately went to Chris Pang and Pierre Png, respectively, with both actors also being fully Chinese. While admitting that the rejection hurt, Liu tweeted that the experience "led to some really meaningful feedback being shared about [his] work and craft". Liu defended Golding's casting, describing him as "perfectly cast" for Nick and praised the film for paving the way for Asian representation.

=== Ethnic representation of Singapore ===
In contrast to those calling for Chinese actors to fill its roles, others, particularly those in Asian countries, expressed disappointment in the film's lack of ethnic Malays and Indians, who have a prominent presence in Singapore. Kirsten Han, a Singaporean journalist, said that the film "obscur[ed] the Malay, Indian, and Eurasian (and more) populations who make the country the culturally rich and unique place that it is". Some were critical towards the omission of the country's Malays and Indians—the second and third largest ethnic groups in Singapore, respectively—thus not representing its multiracial population wholly.

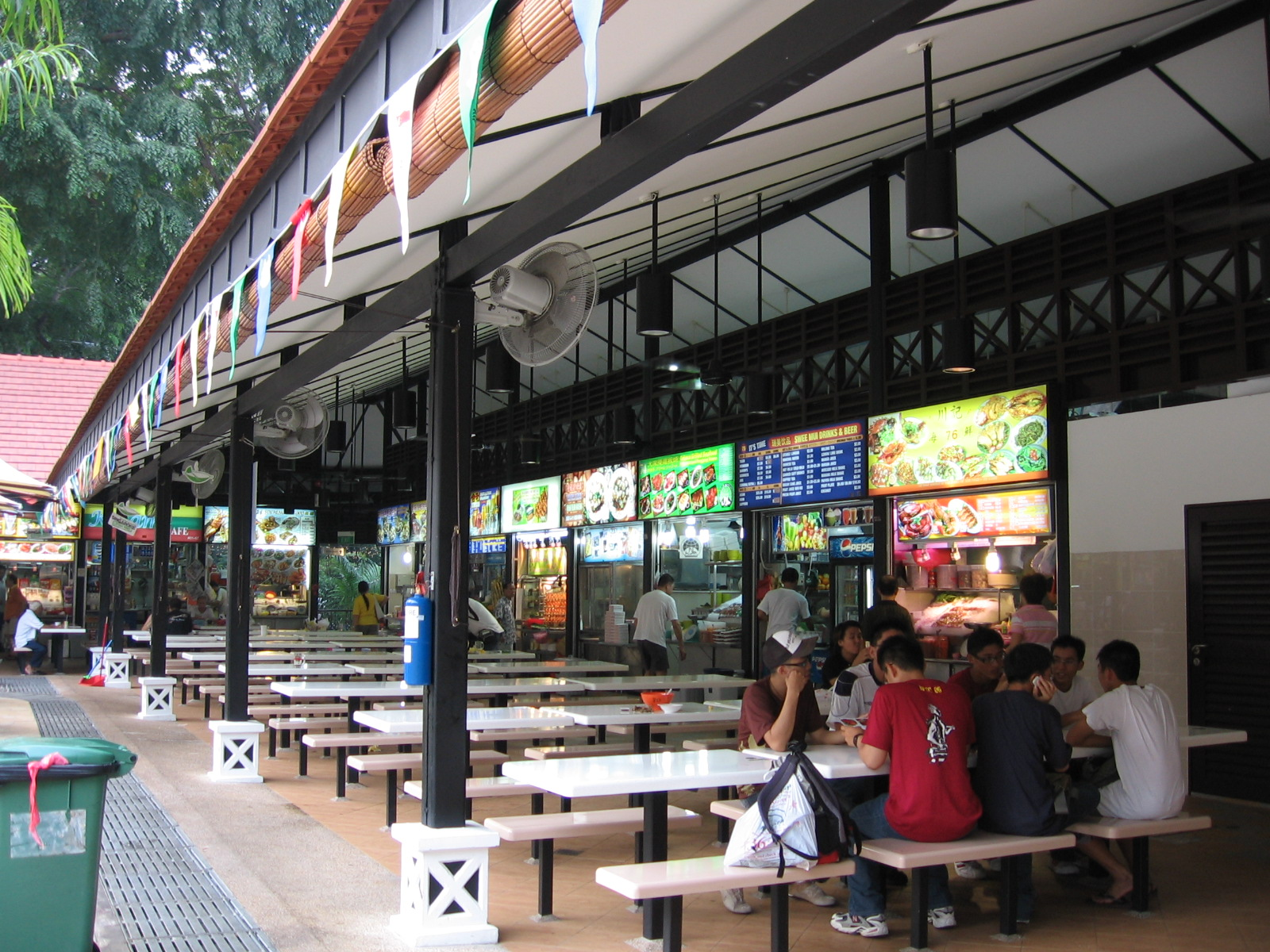
The film's scene at the Newton Food Centre received criticism for its lack of cultural diversity when showing vendors and the food they serve.

Ian Chong, a political scientist at the National University of Singapore, commented that the film "represents the worst of Singapore. Erases minorities. Erases the poor and marginalized. All you get are rich, privileged ethnic Chinese." Alfian Sa'at, a Malay Singaporean poet and playwright, commented on the film's title, referring to it as "Crazy Rich EAST Asians", and adding "Does a win for representation mean replacing white people with white people wannabes[?]" Multiple critics also criticized the comedic scene in which the characters Rachel Chu and Peik Lin were frightened by Sikh guards, noting that "the presentation of brown men as scary predators is played for laughs", is "blind to racial politics in Singapore", and presented a "buffoonish performance [that is] as excruciating as Mickey Rooney's as the Japanese photographer living above Audrey Hepburn in Breakfast at Tiffany's." However, one commenter noted that the book which the film is based on "is aware of its lack of minority representation [and] actually alludes to the closed minded attitude of some social circles in Singapore. One of the family members got disowned for marrying a Malay."

Other critics defended the film's portrayal of ethnic representation. Ilyas Sholihyn, a Malay Singaporean writing for Coconuts, stated that "it's hard to imagine the story is even relatable to most Chinese Singaporeans" due to the film's focus on the extremely wealthy, noting that Crazy Rich Asians was highly Americanized and not made for native Singaporeans, but rather "a high-fantasy Hollywood film made for maximum appeal to East Asian-Americans". He also criticized certain decisions regarding representation, such as how the scene at the Newton Food Centre lacked accurate cultural diversity, and that the roles for the limited number of non-Chinese Singaporeans, such as guards and valets, was tokenism. Surekha A. Yadav of the Malay Mail defended the film's lack of non-ethnic Chinese Singaporeans, describing it as an accurate portrayal of Chinese Singaporeans, particularly wealthy ones, who, per statistics from the Institute of Policy Studies, have minimal and even discriminatory interactions with Singaporean minority ethnic groups. Regarding the film specifically, Yadav explained that "it is the extremely privileged edge of this upper segment of Singapore society that Crazy Rich Asians depicts. In reality, this is a world where minorities play a very small role."

In a 2021 interview with Insider, Chu had said he regretted casting non-Chinese people in subservient roles and "totally gets" the criticism.

== Accolades ==
Award	Date of ceremony	Category	Recipient(s)	Result	Ref.
American Cinema Editors Awards	February 1, 2019	Best Edited Feature Film – Comedy or Musical	Myron Kerstein	Nominated	
Art Directors Guild Awards	February 2, 2019	Best Production Design in a Contemporary Film	Crazy Rich Asians	Won	
Costume Designers Guild Awards	February 19, 2019	Excellence in Contemporary Film	Mary E. Vogt	Won	
Critics' Choice Awards	January 13, 2019	Best Acting Ensemble	Crazy Rich Asians	Nominated	
Critics' Choice Awards	January 13, 2019	Best Comedy	Crazy Rich Asians	Won	
Critics' Choice Awards	January 13, 2019	Best Actress in a Comedy	Constance Wu	Nominated	
Critics' Choice Awards	January 13, 2019	Best Production Design	Nelson Coates, Andrew Baseman	Nominated	
Detroit Film Critics Society	December 3, 2018	Best Ensemble	Crazy Rich Asians	Nominated	
Golden Globe Awards	January 6, 2019	Best Motion Picture – Musical or Comedy	Crazy Rich Asians	Nominated	
Golden Globe Awards	January 6, 2019	Best Actress in a Motion Picture – Comedy or Musical	Constance Wu	Nominated	
Hollywood Film Awards	November 4, 2018	Breakout Ensemble Award	Crazy Rich Asians	Honoree	
Humanitas Prize	February 8, 2019	Comedy Feature Film	Crazy Rich Asians	Nominated	
ICG Publicists Awards	February 22, 2019	Maxwell Weinberg Publicist Showmanship of the Year – Motion Picture	Crazy Rich Asians	Won	
Location Managers Guild Awards	September 21, 2019	Outstanding Locations in Contemporary Film	Guy Sahibjahn	Nominated	
Make-Up Artists and Hair Stylists Guild Awards	February 16, 2019	Best Contemporary Make-Up	Heike Merker, Irina Strukova	Nominated	
Make-Up Artists and Hair Stylists Guild Awards	February 16, 2019	Best Contemporary Hair Styling	Heike Merker, Sophia Knight	Won	
NAACP Image Awards	March 30, 2019	Outstanding Motion Picture	Crazy Rich Asians	Nominated	
NAACP Image Awards	March 30, 2019	Outstanding Actress in a Motion Picture	Constance Wu	Nominated	
NAACP Image Awards	March 30, 2019	Outstanding Writing in a Motion Picture	Peter Chiarelli, Adele Lim	Nominated	
National Board of Review	January 8, 2019	Best Acting By an Ensemble	Crazy Rich Asians	Won	
People's Choice Awards	November 11, 2018	The Comedy Movie of 2018	Crazy Rich Asians	Nominated	
People's Choice Awards	November 11, 2018	The Comedy Movie Star of 2018	Awkwafina	Shortlisted	
People's Choice Awards	November 11, 2018	The Comedy Movie Star of 2018	Constance Wu	Shortlisted	
Producers Guild of America Awards	January 19, 2019	Best Theatrical Motion Picture	Crazy Rich Asians – Nina Jacobson & Brad Simpson, John Penotti	Nominated	
San Diego Film Critics Society	December 10, 2018	Best Comedic Performance	Awkwafina	Nominated	
San Diego Film Critics Society	December 10, 2018	Best Costume Design	Mary E. Vogt	Nominated	
Satellite Awards	February 17, 2019	Best Motion Picture – Comedy/Musical	Crazy Rich Asians	Nominated	
Satellite Awards	February 17, 2019	Best Actress in a Motion Picture, Comedy/Musical	Constance Wu	Nominated	
Screen Actors Guild Awards	January 27, 2019	Outstanding Performance by a Cast in a Motion Picture	Cast of Crazy Rich Asians	Nominated	
Teen Choice Awards	August 11, 2019	Choice Comedy Movie	Crazy Rich Asians	Won	
Teen Choice Awards	August 11, 2019	Choice Comedy Movie Actor	Henry Golding	Nominated	
Teen Choice Awards	August 11, 2019	Choice Comedy Movie Actress	Awkwafina	Nominated	
Teen Choice Awards	August 11, 2019	Choice Comedy Movie Actress	Constance Wu	Nominated	
The Asian Awards	April 12, 2019	Outstanding Achievement in Cinema	The cast of Crazy Rich Asians	Won	

== Future ==
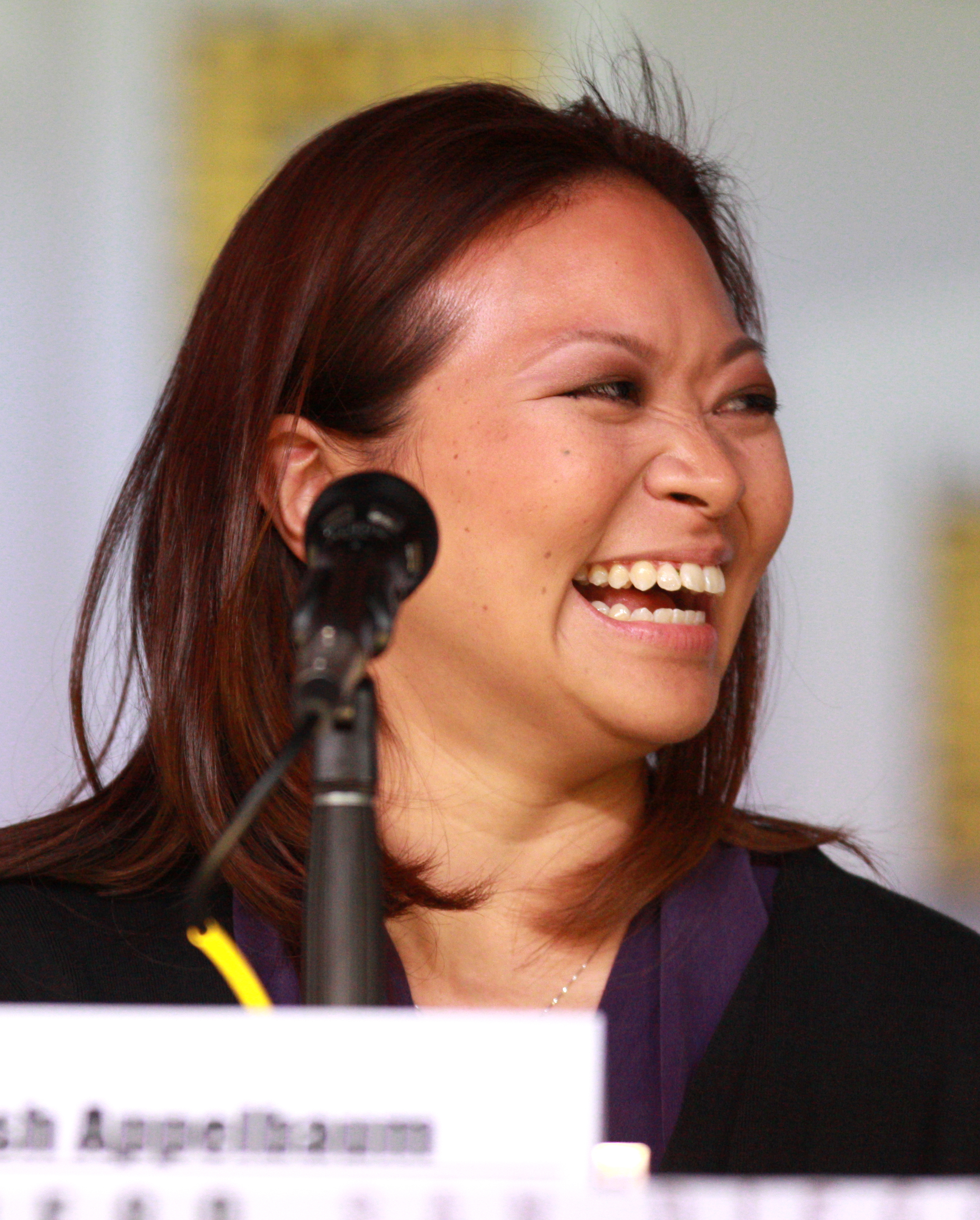
Screenwriter Adele Lim left production on the two sequels to Crazy Rich Asians following a pay dispute, which she felt was founded in racism and sexism.

As of November 2025, discussions and announcements regarding one or more sequels has been ongoing for over seven years. Prior to the film's release, Jon M. Chu said he would be eager to direct a sequel if the first film was a success, stating, "We have other stories outside of the Crazy Rich Asians world that are ready to be told too, from filmmakers and storytellers who haven't had their stories told yet." On August 22, 2018, following the film's strong opening, Warner Bros. Pictures confirmed a sequel was in development, with Chiarelli and Lim returning to write the script, based on the book's sequel, China Rich Girlfriend. Chu and actors Wu, Golding, and Yeoh all have options for a sequel, although several of the key actors were committed to other projects until 2020. Producer Nina Jacobson later announced that China Rich Girlfriend and an adaptation of the final installment in Kwan's trilogy, Rich People Problems, would be filmed back-to-back in 2020 to reduce the wait time between those two films.

In September 2019, screenwriter Adele Lim, who had co-written Crazy Rich Asians with Peter Chiarelli, left production on the film's sequels following a pay dispute. Lim had reportedly been offered US$110,000 to write the sequels, while Chiarelli had been offered US$800,000-$1,000,000 for the same role. Lim stated, "that the pay difference represented a greater issue of sexism and racism in Hollywood, as the industry views women and people of color as "soy sauce"—or simply a means to add minor cultural details to screenplays, rather than to provide a substantial writing role". Director Jon M. Chu voiced support for Lim in a statement, explaining that, while he was disappointed she wouldn't return for the sequels, he would continue to work with Lim elsewhere and that "the conversation this has started is MUCH more important than ourselves... so who am I to get in the way of that." He added that he agreed with Lim's criticisms of the film industry, and requested that people refrain from criticizing Chiarelli, as "he is a good man, a creative force and has been a pro in the business for many many years". Warner Bros.' business affairs department issued a response as well, stating that Chiarelli had more experience working on films as Lim's résumé had only consisted of television credits prior to Crazy Rich Asians, and that "making an exception would set a troubling precedent in the business". They also noted that an alternative offer for Lim had been drafted, which she did not take. Lim later voiced thanks for the public support she had received, writing on Twitter: "To people going through their own fight - you are not alone. Also, I have only love for Jon M. Chu and the cast & crew of Crazy Rich Asians." On March 21, 2022, it was reported that Amy Wang was set to write the sequel, replacing Chiarelli and Lim.

In May 2022, it was reported that a spin-off film centered around Gemma Chan's character and her love story with Harry Shum Jr.'s character, as per the brief tease in the film's mid-credits scene, was in early development, with the script set to be penned by Jason Kim. Elle magazine reported in June 2024 that plans for a production of China Rich Girlfriend are underway from Warner Bros., stating that: "Amy Wang, who was the story editor on The Brothers Sun and worked on From Scratch, is writing the sequel script, Deadline reported in 2022." Wang stated, in March 2025, that the studio was still considering scripts for the sequel.

In February 2025, the years of discussion of sequel films were replaced by an announcement that a TV series was in development by Max, with Lim returning as showrunner. Max confirmed the series was going to be based on the Kwan book series, which includes the titles China Rich Girlfriend, and Rich People Problems. That June, Golding said that production on the series could begin in the "first quarter" of 2026. By October 2025, episode scripts had been written and the cast and crew were "waiting to be officially ready to go", according to Chu.

In October 2026, HBO officially greenlit it as a one-hour original drama series, which serves as a sequel of the film. Constance Wu, Henry Golding, and Ronny Chieng are set to reprise their roles from the film as series regulars, along with Michelle Yeoh in a recurring role. Adele Lim serves as showrunner and executive producer for the series. The film's director Jon M. Chu, along with the film's producers, Nina Jacobson and Brad Simpson have signed on as a executive producers. Filming is set to start in 2027.

== Musical adaptation ==
On April 17, 2024, it was announced that a stage musical adaptation of Crazy Rich Asians was in development, with Jon M. Chu directing, book by Leah Nanako Winkler, music by Helen Park, and lyrics by Amanda Green and Tat Tong.
