= China Rich Girlfriend =

2015 romantic comedy novel by Kevin Kwan

- Author: Kevin Kwan
- Language: English
- Genre: Novel
- Publisher: Doubleday
- Publication date: June 2015
- Media type: Print
- ISBN: 978-0-385-53908-1
- Preceded by: Crazy Rich Asians
- Followed by: Rich People Problems

China Rich Girlfriend is a 2015 satirical romantic comedy novel by Kevin Kwan. It is the sequel to Crazy Rich Asians, a novel about the wealthy Singapore elite. Kwan was urged to write the sequel by his publishers after the initial success of Crazy Rich Asians. The title refers to a line in the novel in which Nick's mother, Eleanor, exclaims over the wealth of the "China rich" who are billionaires, "These people aren't just everyday rich with a few hundred million. They are China rich!" The novel was followed by a third and final sequel, Rich People Problems, in 2017.

== Plot ==
Carlton Bao, the only son of very wealthy Mainland Chinese parents, crashes his Ferrari into a Jimmy Choo boutique. His mother Bao Shaoyen, while lunching with Eleanor Young and some friends, shows them a photo of Carlton before the accident, and they realize he strongly resembles Rachel Chu.

Rachel Chu and Nicholas Young have repaired their relationship after her disastrous visit to his family. As a result of their engagement, Nicholas is estranged from his mother Eleanor and his grandmother. His aunt Jacqueline Ling informs him that in consequence of his planned marriage, he will find himself shut out of his family and his ancestral home, and warns him that this will be more intolerable than he anticipates.

Nick's cousin Astrid has been reunited with her husband Michael, and their marriage is on a more even financial footing now that Michael's tech company is financially successful and her family respects him. However, Michael's prosperity does not make him even-tempered. Meanwhile Charlie Wu, Astrid's onetime fiancé who secretly engineered the success of Michael's firm in order to make Astrid happy, is struggling in his marriage with Isabel.

Kitty Pong, the former actress whose marriage to Bernard Tai brought her into the Singapore elite, tries to buy her way into the high society of Hong Kong by appearing in gossip magazines and buying high-profile art. However, she is socially clumsy. Finding herself continually shunned, she hires the services of Corinna Ko-Tung, a woman from a well-born family, who helps Kitty appear more sophisticated.

Eleanor Young learns that her son and Rachel have settled on a wedding date and a location in California. Outraged, she pries more details from Astrid's young son and intrudes upon their wedding rehearsal. She informs Rachel that she has located her long-lost father, and she reconnects him with Rachel and her mother. Eleanor decides that she approves of Nick and Rachel's marriage, Nick is suspicious and asks her why she is reversing her position. She reveals it wasn't just because Rachel now associates with the wealthy elite of China, but also that Eleanor was trying to protect both him and Rachel from Su Yi's wrath. Years ago, she endured life as Su Yi's disapproved daughter-in-law due to Philip marrying her out of love. Rachel meets her father, Bao Gaoliang, prior to the wedding, and is afterwards invited to spend time with his entire family in Shanghai during her honeymoon. Bao Shaoyen, Gaoliang's wife, is angered by this and demands Bao Gaoliang keep her away from her house. He places her in a fancy hotel and stalls any meeting for over a week, but Nick suspects mischief. Carlton is also banned from associating with her, but decides to meet Rachel anyway, and quickly becomes close with her and Nick. He introduces her to his wealthy unofficial girlfriend Colette Bing. The four of them eventually travel to Paris for a shopping spree. At a party, Colette's official boyfriend of three years, Richie Yang, proposes but she does not accept. He gets angry at Carlton; and the two begin a fight.

Rachel begins to feel upset she has only met her father once since reuniting. Colette and Rachel try to stop Carlton from a drag race against Richie. In anger, he accidentally tells Rachel that Bao Shaoyen refuses to let her into her household, as she fears losing her husband's political advantages for having an illegitimate child, and wishes to prevent Rachel from receiving Carlton's inheritance. Before leaving, Colette calls him a spoiled brat for hurting Rachel and tells him not to go through with the race with Richie. Upon learning about his previous accident, Rachel convinces Carlton not to race Richie. In turn, Carlton apologizes to Rachel for his behavior.

Rachel decides to leave China, but returns for a spa weekend with her friend Peik Lin. However, at the spa, she becomes very ill and is placed under medical watch after experiencing mysterious organ failures. At the hospital, Peik Lin and Nick receive a bouquet of flowers with a note, saying that Rachel was poisoned with Tarquinoid as a warning to never return to China. The poison is extremely rare, and Carlton believes that his parents' pharmaceutical company may be involved, as they recently acquired the rights to distribution of Tarquinioid. Believing Bao Shaoyen poisoned Rachel, he comes home to confront her about it, but she denies involvement. Refusing to believe his mother, Carlton then confesses to his father about how she bribed everyone to cover up the truth of his accident as well as the other girl's death. However, when Rachel discovered the truth about the crash, he believes Shaoyen intentionally poisoned her in order to prevent her from causing a scandal. Carlton ends his confession stating that their family will face disgrace from the China elite, but not by Rachel and him, but by Shaoyen for trying to poison Rachel. Now remorseful for how he's treated Rachel, Bao Gaoliang visits her and Nick over in Hong Kong at Eddie's apartment. Apologizing, Gaoliang confesses that Shaoyen has become cooperative with the police. He invites Rachel into his home, where she is introduced to the rest of his family who are all touched by her story. Bao Shaoyen finally meets Rachel and discovers how similar she looks to her son. She realizes her fears were misplaced and apologizes to her. In doing so, they start to get along.

The police discover that Colette's assistant Roxanne was behind the poisoning, which was done in response to Colette's concerns that Carlton's inheritance would be reduced. Despite Colette's lack of knowledge as to what happened, Carlton blames Colette for nearly losing his now beloved older sister, and soon breaks up with her. Nick is hesitant, but Rachel agrees to meet with Colette and accepts her apology. Colette asks that Rachel help her and Carlton reconcile. Rachel does not want to get involved, and Colette becomes angry. She accuses Rachel of vindictively keeping them apart, and begins yelling at and berating her. Rachel responds by accusing Colette of being selfish. The argument ends when Rachel tells Colette to grow up. Unbeknownst to either of them, the incident is taped and becomes widely viewed on WeChat. Humiliated, Colette also loses her sponsorship to a popular fashion designer label. This is made worse when she learns through the tabloids that her father, Jack Bing, has been having an affair with Kitty.

Meanwhile, Astrid finds herself increasingly confiding in Charlie Wu after her husband becomes detached and cold. Michael gets interviewed by a magazine about his family, naming him Father of the Year after bragging about his accomplishments and showcasing his luxury items. The magazine then does research into Astrid Leong and publishes information about her lineage and wealth. This angers her family and he is forced to meet with her father, who berates him in front of a man Michael is trying to impress. The magazines are recalled and retracted from distribution, and Michael begins to believe that his company's situation is the result of Astrid's father's meddling. Astrid's father starts digging into Michael's company, showing Astrid that the company was bought at a loss by Charlie so that Michael would feel more confident in the marriage. Michael confronts Astrid about her relationship with Charlie, revealing he has secretly read her messages and listened to all of her phone calls with him. After attempting to leave the house with their son, Michael threatens her with a weapon. Astrid takes control of the situation and escapes with her son. Later, it is revealed that Charlie Wu has divorced Isabel, and that he and Astrid have been appearing in public together.

Kitty Pong and Corinna Ko-Tung, her society consultant, have a problem: no one has seen Kitty's husband, Bernard Tai, in ages. There are rumors regarding his disappearance (he's dead, he's incapacitated, he's Kitty's sex slave somewhere in a dungeon) along with their daughter, Giselle. Kitty reveals to Corinna where Bernard is hiding: in a small house in Los Angeles while undergoing reconstructive surgery. He has dramatically changed his values and lifestyle from being in California for so long. Kitty kidnaps her daughter and they escape using Jack Bing's private plane. She returns to her lavish house in Singapore with her daughter and reconnects her mother-in-law Carol Tai with her granddaughter, while beginning her lawsuit with Bernard for custody of Giselle.

== Characters ==
- Rachel Young (née Chu): is an economics professor at New York University who is engaged to and marries Nick Young. An American economist of Chinese descent who was raised by a single mother and had a humble upbringing. She is revealed to be connected to upper class wealth after recently discovering that her biological father is a Chinese billionaire.
- Nicholas "Nick" Young: Rachel's husband. He is a history professor at New York University and a member of the Singapore elite.
- Kerry Chu: Rachel's mother, who once had a romantic relationship with Bao Gaoliang.
- Eleanor Young: Nick's mother, who finally approves of Rachel due to the fact that her father is a Chinese billionaire.
- Edison "Eddie" Cheng: Nick's obnoxious cousin who works in private banking; he discovers Eleanor's secret account.
- Goh Peik Lin: Rachel's rich Singaporean best friend whose family owns a real estate development company, Near West Organization.
- Bao Gaoliang: Carlton and Rachel's biological father who is a top Chinese politician and a billionaire who owns a pharmaceutical company. Under his boyhood nickname, Kao Wei, he used to help Kerry whenever her drunkard husband got angry in their apartment building. They eventually fell for each other. Kerry never told him they had a child together.
- Bao Shaoyen: Carlton's mother, who has a hard time at first accepting Rachel. She has a gift room that consists of more than one hundred Hermès bags that she plans to give to every doctor, nurse, and therapist that helped Carlton.
- Carlton Bao: The 23-year-old English educated son of Bao Shaoyen and Bao Gaoliang who lives a very wild lifestyle. He is Rachel's paternal half-brother, and is "the spitting image of her."
- Colette Bing: A famous fashion blogger and the spoiled daughter of either the third or fifth (depending on who is doing the ranking) richest men in China. She is a control freak and is Carlton's on-again, off-again unofficial girlfriend.
- Mrs. Bing: Colette's germaphobic mother.
- Richie Yang: The son of a multi-billionaire father who's one of the richest men in China. He's one of Colette's suitors and the one Colette's father wants her to marry. When she turns him down, he challenges Carlton to a race, which is later called off.
- Jack Bing: Colette's multi-billionaire father who insists on her marrying Richie, due to Richie's family's multi-billionaire status. He is later revealed to be having an affair with Kitty, which humiliates Colette.
- Roxanne Ma: Colette's personal assistant, who is very loyal to her. She was Colette's 18th birthday present from her father. She is later revealed to have poisoned Rachel with Tarquinioid.
- Michael Teo: Astrid's newly minted billionaire husband whose start-up technology company brings a huge success, due to it being secretly bought by Charlie. His success makes him cold and detached, and later turns rageful.
- Charlie Wu: Astrid's billionaire former fiancé who still loves her, despite being married to Isabel Wu.
- Astrid Teo (née Leong): Nick's fashion icon cousin who is referred to as "The Goddess" and is known for her impeccable fashion sense.
- Bernard Tai: Kitty's estranged billionaire husband who's been hiding in California due to depression after a mix-up on his plastic surgery. He engages Giselle (his daughter with Kitty) in his strange activities and does not want Kitty involved in their lives, believing it's better if she stays in Hong Kong. Bernard finds himself in a high-profile international custody battle for full custody of Giselle from Kitty.
- Kitty Tai (née Pong): Bernard's wife who is a former soap-star (and rumored porn-star) turned social climber. She has a daughter named Giselle, whom she's worried about due to Bernard's strange raising and lack of having her involved in their family's life. She kidnaps their daughter and escapes to a lavish home in Singapore. Later revealing herself as the lover of Jack Bing, Kitty sues Bernard for custody of Giselle.
- Corinna Ko-Tung: A woman from a well-bred family who helps Kitty in her social-climbing agenda.
- Datin Carol Tai: A devout Christian who is the wife of a corrupt billionaire, Dato' Tai Toh Lui. She is one of Eleanor's best friends. She has a granddaughter, Giselle, whom she reconnects with after Kitty kidnapped Giselle and returned to Singapore.

== Reception ==
China Rich Girlfriend was a bestselling novel.

The novel received positive reviews from Entertainment Weekly and The New York Times, among other publications. Anne Kingston of Maclean's wrote of the novel, "Kevin Kwan’s sequel to the bestselling Crazy Rich Asians is perhaps even more delicious than the first."

The Washington Post named it "the year's best beach reading" and it was excerpted in Vanity Fair.

== Film adaptation ==
Time reported on August 15, 2018 that Kwan had been tasked with developing the sequel to Crazy Rich Asians from his follow-up novel China Rich Girlfriend. The planning was still in pre-production as of August 2018, with several of the key actors committed to other projects until 2020. Director Jon Chu was also already committed to shoot the film adaptation of In the Heights, which was released in June 2021.

Awkwafina was interviewed in January 2019 and indicated that there were still no scripts for the sequel and that production filming had not started. According to Town and Country magazine, the filming and premiere of the film was not scheduled to take place until 2020. According to a Slash film journal article, the two sequels, including Rich People Problems, were to be shot back-to-back in 2020 once the filming commenced. Shooting was expected to be delayed until at least the end of 2020. Screenwriter Adele Lim declined to work on the sequels because of an equal-pay inequity dispute during negotiations in fall 2018. Color Force had hired the experienced Peter Chiarelli to write the screenplay for the Crazy Rich Asians adaptation; when Chu joined the original production, he brought Lim on to add authentic details from Singapore and Malaysia. For the sequels, Warner Brothers had initially offered Lim a salary approximately 1/8th of Chiarelli's pay; although they later made an offer closer in parity to Chiarelli's, who then offered to split his fee with Lim, Lim declined.

On April 29, 2019, CNBC reported that Harry Shum Jr. was to be cast in the role of playing Astrid's previous boyfriend in the sequel to Crazy Rich Asians, stating, "Shum will play Charlie Wu, the former flame of Astrid Young Teo (played by Gemma Chan), cousin of lead character Nick Young, in China Rich Girlfriend, which is currently in pre-production." The sequel film was expected to focus on the relationship between Charlie and Astrid, the search for Rachel's father, and Kitty Pong.

Elle reported in June 2024 that plans for a Warner Bros adaptation of the second novel are underway, stating that Amy Wang, who was the story editor on The Brothers Sun and worked on From Scratch, is writing the sequel script.

== See also ==
- Chinese people in New York City
- Overseas Chinese
- Chinese Singaporeans
