= Crazy Rich Asians (novel) =

2013 romantic comedy novel by Kevin Kwan

- Author: Kevin Kwan
- Language: English
- Genre: Novel
- Publisher: Doubleday
- Publication date: 2013
- Media type: Print
- ISBN: 978-0-385-53697-4
- Followed by: China Rich Girlfriend

Crazy Rich Asians is a 2013 satirical romantic comedy novel by Kevin Kwan. Kwan stated that his intention in writing the novel was to "introduce a contemporary Asia to a North American audience". He claimed the novel was loosely based on his own childhood in Singapore. The novel became a bestseller and was followed by two sequels, China Rich Girlfriend in 2015 and Rich People Problems in 2017. A film adaptation of the novel was released on August 15, 2018.

== Plot ==
The novel begins with a quote from the 14th-century Moroccan traveler Ibn Battuta:

Nowhere in the world are there to be found people richer than the Chinese.

— Ibn Battuta

The book focuses on Rachel Chu, Nicholas (Nick) Young, Eleanor Young, Astrid Leong, and Edison Cheng. The story revolves around the grand wedding of Singapore's most eligible bachelor, Colin Khoo, and the supermodel Araminta Lee, which everyone calls the wedding of the century.

=== Rachel and Nick leave New York to arrive in Singapore ===
Rachel and her boyfriend, Nick, both work as professors at New York University (NYU). She was raised by her single mother and leads a typical middle-class life. When her boyfriend takes her to meet his family in Singapore, she is completely unaware of what is in store for her. Although he grew up in London, Nick is a Singapore native. Unknown to anyone in New York, he not only belongs to one of the ten wealthiest families in Asia but is possibly the sole heir to his family's great fortune. Despite this wealth, he was raised to be humble and to keep a low profile. Because of his upbringing, he is confident his family will approve of his simple girlfriend, but things turn out very differently than he expects.

Eleanor Young is Nick's controlling mother who is obsessed with prestige and pride. Since Nick was born, she has allowed her mother-in-law, the Young family matriarch, to practically raise her only child, so that, when the time comes, she will leave the family fortune to him. As a result, Eleanor has not been very involved in Nick's upbringing, and does not live with Nick's father, who chooses to live and work away from her in Australia to manage their family's businesses. She is also very adamant that Nick marry someone from the close-knit, rich circle of her friends and plans to sabotage Nick and Rachel's relationship. She hires a private detective to gather information on Rachel's family, which she later uses to attempt to drive Rachel out of Nick's life, but ultimately results in her son freezing her out of his life. Rachel is shocked when she learns who her father, Zhou Fang Min, is and leaves to stay with her friend Goh Peik Lin and her family.

Astrid Teo (née Leong) is Nick's famous cousin whose beauty is well known all across Asia. Although she maintains a positive image to her family and society, her marriage is suffering. Michael, her long-suffering husband, is a self-made young man who is looked down on because he does not come from money. Astrid discovers that he might be having an affair with someone in Hong Kong. When she confronts him, Michael admits to having an affair and leaves. With the help of her ex-fiancé Charlie Wu, Astrid confronts him again in Hong Kong where he reveals that he has, in fact, not been having an affair and has only made it seem like he had so that she would want to divorce him, being no longer able to deal with the outsider status since he married into Astrid's family. In a last-ditch effort to help save their marriage and make Astrid happy, Charlie secretly buys shares in Michael's startup company at a highly inflated price.

Edison Cheng is Nick's spoiled Hong Kong cousin who works as a banker. He is one of the few members of his clan who lives up to his birthright as a member of one of the wealthiest families in the world. He wants to impress all his friends and relatives at the wedding, but his plans fall short because of his family, particularly his younger brother Alistair who is dating Kitty Pong, a starlet of questionable background and intentions. Alistair and Kitty are briefly engaged but she leaves him for Bernard Tai, a billionaire's son, after Oliver T'sien misleads her to believe that the Chengs are not as rich as she thought.

=== Rachel and Nick consider breaking-up in Singapore ===
Rachel and Nick suffer a falling out. Nick tries to convince her to stay in the relationship with him, professing that he no longer cares about what society and his family expect from him. Rachel doesn't believe him, claiming that no matter how much they try to ignore his family's legacy, they know they may not be able to. She tells Nick that she wants her children to grow up treasured and loved by their relatives like her own family has done, not raised with a family whose primary concern is their own wealth, family legacy, and the kinds of rich people they know. Rachel breaks up with him as a result and Nick realizes she's lost to him. Depressed, he stays at Colin's house for a while. At the Goh house, Rachel calls her mother, Kerry, and they have a falling out. She demands to know why Kerry didn't tell her about Fang Min being her father. When Kerry tries to explain that he was abusive and she had to save her life, Rachel blames her for her actions and hangs up the phone.

While staying at Colin's house, Nick regrets bringing Rachel to Singapore without giving her an insight into how to deal with his wealthy family. Instead of his family liking Rachel, they successfully turn her against Nick, which leads to their eventual break up. He mentions this to Colin, along with his thoughts of letting Rachel go. However, Colin suggests that Nick fight for Rachel and do one thing to win her back. As Rachel and Peik Lin are preparing to leave to meet Fang Min, Rachel's father who is in jail, Nick stops them from leaving, revealing that he's brought something from China to her. To Rachel's anger, it's her own mother that he brought to Singapore. Annoyed with Nick for preventing her one chance of meeting her father, Rachel tells Kerry off: she doesn't want to see her again and wants her to just let her meet her father. In desperation, Kerry finally reveals the truth about her real father: it isn't Fang Min but a man nicknamed Kao Wei. Rachel decides to listen to her mother and learn about the abuse she went through with Fang Min, including how Kao Wei saved her life by helping her escape to America, where she stayed with her relatives. Upon realizing how abusive Fang Min was to Kerry, Rachel is remorseful for her earlier behavior and reconciles with her mother. Nick takes the ladies to Marina Bay Sands for Singapore Slings. Rachel reunites with Nick.

== The Young, T'sien, and Shang Clan ==
Shang Su Yi's father, Shang Loong Ma, started a shipping company in Beijing and then emigrated to Singapore with his multiple wives and children. Although he had six children, he only formally acknowledged three: Alexander (Ah Jit), Su Yi, and Alfred. Shang Loong Ma arranged for his daughter to marry Sir James Young, who was a doctor. He also arranged for Sir James' sister, Rosemary, to marry T'sien Tsay Tay. T'sien Tsay Tay's oldest daughter was then promised to Alfred. Shang Su Yi and Sir James Young had five children: Felicity, Catherine, Philip, Victoria, and Alexandra. T'sien Tsay Tay and Rosemary Young had five children as well: Mabel, Richard "Dickie", Mark, Anna May, and Clarence. Alfred Shang and Mabel T'sien had four children: Leonard, Charles, Frederick, and Cassandra. Alexander (Ah Jit) died as a young man with no heirs.

In the book, a huge amount of respect and admiration is shown to the Youngs, Shangs, and T'siens primarily due to their wealth and prestige as one of the oldest wealthy families in Singapore and Asia.

Wang Lan Yin	Shang Loong Ma
'Ah Jit' Alexander Shang (Note: Died early without issue)	Rosemary Young	T'sien Tsay Tay
Richard "Dickie" T'sien (Note: Married Nancy Tan)	Anna May T'sien (Note: Married George Yeoh)
Shang Su Yi, Lady Young	Sir James Young	Mark T'sien (Note: Married Bernadette Ling, one son: Oliver T'sien)	Clarence T'sien (Note: Married Bettina Kah)
Mabel T'sien	Alfred Shang
Sir Leonard Shang (Note: Married Lady India Heskeith)	Charles Shang (Note: Married Anne Lygon)	Frederick Shang (Note: Married Hon. Penelope Curzon)	Cassandra Shang (Note: alias Radio One Asia)
Catherine Young (Note: Married Prince Aakara of the Thai royal family)	**Eleanor Sung**	Philip Young	Alexandra Young	Dr Malcolm Cheng
Felicity Young	Henry "Harry" Leong Sr.	Victoria Young
Kerry Chu
**Rachel Chu**	**Nicholas Young**	Fiona Tung	**Edison "Eddie" Cheng** (Note: Eddie is four years older than his cousins Astrid and Nicholas, who are the same age.)	Alistair Cheng
**Astrid Leong**	Michael Teo	Peter Leong	Cecilia Cheng	Tony Moncur
Henry Leong, Jr.	Alexander Leong
Cassian Teo	Constantine Cheng Augustine Cheng Kalliste Cheng	Jake Moncur

Notes

Background color applied to blood relatives. Bold name indicates a third-person point-of-view character. The book is told from the perspective of five main characters, shown in this chart. Four are related: Nicholas (Nick) Young, Eleanor Young, Astrid Leong, and Edison Cheng. The fifth is the lead character, Rachel Chu.

== Development ==
Before his father died of cancer in 2010, Kwan suspended his work for eighteen months to care for him, during which they would reminisce about life in Singapore. He began writing stories as a way to preserve those memories while grieving his father's death. The novel was inspired by his childhood in Singapore. Kwan first developed what became the second chapter of the book from a poem entitled "Singapore Bible Study," which he had written for a creative writing course in college. That poem describes the study group as "an excuse to gossip and show off new jewelry". After adapting that poem into a chapter of a novel, he was inspired to complete the entire story. Kwan shared an incomplete draft of the novel with an editor friend, who later complained he had ruined her Thanksgiving dinner, as she could not put the book down, delaying meal preparations. She encouraged him to engage an agent for the manuscript.

No one was really writing about contemporary Asia and what was happening in Asia in 2009. Asia is growing up and enjoying a renaissance with wealth creation which is now being forwarded to the U.S. and Europe. My mission was to showcase this world as accurately as I could.

— Kevin Kwan, August 2016 interview with NextShark

He also recognized there was a gap in the coverage of contemporary Asia in the western book market, which was publishing either historical fiction or Asian-American identity works.

Kwan insists that everything he writes is based on real or at least plausible situations in Singapore, and that he even had to tone some things down because they were so over-the-top, they would be too unbelievable for readers. “My editor was like, ‘No one will believe this.’ And I would say, ‘But this really happened,’ and she’d reply, ‘It doesn’t matter. You’re going to lose readers because it’s going to seem so unreal that people would spend this much money, or do something this excessive.’”

Kwan stated some characters "are loosely inspired by people I know" while others are completely fictional. Tyersall Park was inspired by Kwan's paternal grandparents, with whom he lived while growing up in Singapore. He stated they had "a quiet elegance in the way they carried on with their lives, as well as a beauty to the customs and rituals we practised". The lavish decorations and clothing described in the novel were also inspired by true stories, but Kwan's editor asked him to cut some of those details, as they were hardly believable. Kwan sent the editor links to news articles to prove that "truth is stranger than fiction when it comes to details".

The book trilogy is full of vivid descriptions of sprawling mansions, exotic getaways on private jets complete with a full spa, high fashion and gluttonous feasts. While some of the details, such as a living room with a sunken pond full of baby sharks, seem almost too fantastical to be real, Kwan assures they are. The author, who comes from an old establishment family from Singapore, can still picture the opulent world he had been a part of even decades later. “I remember I had an aunt that lived in a house that had this beautiful ceramic wall that was entirely a painting of a peacock,” he said. “There were all these beautiful scenes from my childhood that really are coated in amber.”

Kwan writes, ‘I’ve lost count of how many times I’ve been asked whether women like Astrid truly exist, but I would always answer that, as a child in the late 1970s, I personally knew women who took the Concorde from Singapore to Paris via London twice a year for their couture fittings and that Queen Sirikit of Thailand had been partial to Balmain since 1960. I have pictures of my grandmother from the 1920s and ’30s in avant-garde dresses that looked like they could have come from the House of Worth or Lucien Lelong. She would never say if they were couture, but I do recall her telling me, “All my clothes and shoes came from Paris.”

== Reception ==
Janet Maslin of The New York Times wrote of the novel, "Mr. Kwan knows how to deliver guilty pleasures. He keeps the repartee nicely outrageous, the excess wretched and the details wickedly delectable." It is reported to have been translated into over 40 languages, and sold 5 million copies.

== Adaptations ==
A film adaptation of the 2013 novel was directed by Jon M. Chu under Warner Bros. Pictures. Filming began in April 2017. It was distributed worldwide by Warner Bros. Pictures after being released on August 15, 2018. The director of the film appears in the book as a distant cousin of Rachel Chu's.

In February 2025, it was announced that a series adaptation of the novel was in development at Max, with Adele Lim, who co-wrote the 2018 film, serving as showrunner and executive producer alongside Jon M. Chu. In October 2026, HBO officially greenlit it as a one-hour drama series.

== See also ==
- Chinese in New York City
- Overseas Chinese
- Chinese Singaporeans
