= Sepideh Moafi =

American actress (born 1985)

- Born: September 18, 1985 (age 41); Regensburg, West Germany (now Germany)
- Education: San Francisco Conservatory of Music (BM); University of California, Irvine (MFA)
- Occupations: Actor; singer
- Years active: 2013–present

Sepideh Moafi (Persian: سپیده معافی; born September 18, 1985) is an American actress. She is best known for her roles in The Deuce (2017–2019), The L Word: Generation Q (2019–2023), The Killing of Two Lovers (2020), Black Bird (2022), and The Pitt (2026). For the latter, she was nominated for the Primetime Emmy Award for Outstanding Supporting Actress in a Drama Series.

== Early life and education ==
Sepideh Moafi was born in September 1985 in a refugee camp in Regensburg, Bavaria, Germany. Prior to her birth, her parents had fled Iran following the Islamic Revolution. After two years in Turkey and then Germany, where Moafi's parents sought political asylum and claimed refugee status, Moafi's family were granted visas to move to the United States. Moafi is an American citizen.

During her childhood years, she studied opera and was later pulled into musical theatre and jazz. Moafi started singing at 15 years old, and within a year had obtained a full scholarship to the San Francisco Conservatory of Music, where she graduated in 2007.

Moafi attended the University of California Irvine to study acting, later graduating with an MFA in 2013.

== Career ==
In 2013, Moafi received her first on-screen credit in a guest-starring role as Aaliya Zaki in the tenth episode of season four of CBS's Blue Bloods.

In 2015, Moafi landed what would be her breakout role, a recurring role as Loretta in HBO's The Deuce, an American drama television series created by David Simon and George Pelecanos exploring the stories of sex workers in 1970s-80s New York. Before filming the pilot, Simon met Moafi for a coffee date, where they discussed the premise of The Deuce and Loretta's arc within the show. While her character on The Deuce had been planned early on, Moafi subsequently landed a lead role in Notorious (a show which was to be filmed in Los Angeles) after meeting with Simon and before the pilot of The Deuce was filmed. Moafi wrote a letter to the executive producers of The Deuce, Simon, Pelecanos and Nina Kostroff Noble hoping that they would still let her be a part of The Deuce despite her regular gig on Notorious. The executive producers on The Deuce let Moafi continue to be a part of their show and worked around her schedule as The Deuce was mainly filmed in New York. However, as a result, Loretta's arc could not be fulfilled as initially planned and had to go a different direction because of Moafi's scheduling conflicts and she was only in three episodes in the first season of The Deuce. The pilot of The Deuce was shot in 2015 and the first season was shot a year later.

In 2016, Moafi starred as Megan Byrd on ABC's Notorious. The show is based on real-life criminal defense attorney Mark Geragos and Larry King Live news producer Wendy Walker. Moafi's character is a junior producer and booker on the fictional number one cable news show Louise Herrick Live and her character is considered to be the number-two to Julia George, played by Piper Perabo. While the show originally landed a 13-episode first season, ABC cut the first season to 10 episodes and the show was cancelled by ABC after one season.

After Notorious was cancelled, Moafi continued to appear in her recurring role as Loretta on The Deuce, and her character was made a series regular in season 3, the final season. Moafi's character on The Deuce was initially a sex-worker working on the streets of New York and later became an anti-pornography activist, which was one of the main reasons Moafi wanted to continue to be a part of The Deuce despite her scheduling conflicts. To prepare for her role as Loretta, Moafi did research into the history of New York by reading books such as pimp and sex workers' memoirs and studied vintage porn to help her understanding of the historical context that the show was set in. Moafi has stated that The Deuce has changed and influenced her relationship and view of the porn industry after the stories portrayed in the show.

While shooting the second season of The Deuce, Moafi starred in the role of Dahna in a musical off-Broadway One Thousand Nights and One Day which opened on April 15, 2018. Moafi has stated that her career "started out in opera and then theater" and considers opera to "forever be a part of [her] artistic identity".

In 2018, Moafi was cast as a series regular on and starred as Alexis Simms in season 2 of Falling Water. Season 2 of Falling Water premiered in January 2018. Moafi's character was introduced as the new partner of NYPD detective Taka (played by Will Yun Lee) who later discovers the supernatural world in the show. In May 2018, USA Network announced the series' cancellation after its second season.

In 2019, Moafi was cast as Gigi Ghorbani on Showtime's The L Word: Generation Q, a sequel of the early 2000s lesbian classic The L Word. Generation Q premiered on December 8, 2019. At the beginning of season 1 of Generation Q, Moafi's character was introduced as the ex-wife of Natalie "Nat" Bailey (played by Stephanie Allynne) who is currently dating Alice Pieszecki (played by Leisha Hailey), a character that originated in The L Word. Her character was well received by fans and quickly became a fan-favorite among the new cast. In season 1, her character Gigi was involved in a "throuple"/polyamorous relationship with Alice and Nat. In season 2, her character further explored romantic relationships with Bette Porter (played by Jennifer Beals) and Dani Núñez (played by Arienne Mandi).

In 2020, Moafi starred alongside Clayne Crawford in The Killing of Two Lovers, an American drama film written, directed, produced and edited by Robert Machoian. The film had its world premiere at the Sundance Film Festival on January 27, 2020, and the film was released on May 14, 2021. The film tells the separation between the parents of four children in which Moafi plays Niki, the wife of Clayne Crawford's David.

In April 2021, Moafi was cast in the Apple TV+ American crime drama limited series Black Bird. Produced by Dennis Lehane, Moafi stars alongside Taron Egerton, Paul Walter Hauser and Greg Kinnear. Production for the series began in New Orleans in April 2021 and is based on the novel In With The Devil: A Fallen Hero, A Serial Killer, and A Dangerous Bargain for Redemption by James Keene. Moafi plays FBI agent Lauren McCauley in the true crime drama, an FBI agent who approaches protagonist Jimmy Keene about the Larry Hall operation. Moafi attended the premiere event on Wednesday June 29, 2022, at the Regency Bruin Theater in Los Angeles, California. The six-episode limited series premiered globally on July 8, 2022, on Apple TV+.

In November 2021, Moafi was cast as "Hour" in the FX limited series Class of '09 alongside Brian J. Smith, Jake McDorman, Brooke Smith, joining previously announced leads Brian Tyree Henry and Kate Mara. The eight-part series produced by FX Productions revolves around a group of FBI agents who graduated from Quantico in 2009 and are reunited following the death of a mutual friend. The series is executive produced by Tom Rob Smith, Nina Jacobson and Brad Simpson. Class of '09 premiered on May 10, 2023 on FX on Hulu.

In June 2025, Moafi was cast as series regular in HBO Max medical drama series The Pitt, playing attending physician Dr. Baran Al-Hashimi in Season 2.

In May 2026, Moafi starred alongside Hugh Jackman and Marianna Gailus in the Off-Broadway drama, New Born, at The Audible Minetta Lane Theatre in New York City.

In July 2026, Moafi became the first Iranian woman and the first woman from the Middle East to be nominated for a Primetime Emmy Award for Outstanding Supporting Actress in a Drama Series; her nomination was for her role in The Pitt.

== Personal life ==
In 2019, Moafi penned a first person essay sharing her experience as a refugee. In 2021, Moafi was a special guest on Girls Write Now, a writing and mentoring organization for girls and gender-expansive teens. Moafi hosted a program titled Belonging: From Refugee to Hollywood as part of the Summer Salon series in February 2021.

Moafi is a human rights advocate, and serves as an Ambassador to the International Rescue Committee.

== Filmography ==
=== Film ===
Year	Title	Role	Notes	Ref(s)
2010	Violet Is Single	Violet	Short film	
2014	Best Man in the Dark	Tereza Lopez		
2017	Quest: The Truth Always Rises	Susan		
2018	The Arrangements		Short film	
2020	The Killing of Two Lovers	Nikki		
2023	I'll Be Right There	Sophie		
2026	Flesh Impact	Casting director	Short film	
TBA	Wild Berries			

=== Television ===
Year	Title	Role	Notes	Ref(s)
2013	Blue Bloods	Aaliya Zaki	Episode: "Mistaken Identity"	
2014	Unforgettable	Lisa Martinez	Episode: "Manhunt"	
2014	Nurse Jackie	Mrs. Harrison	Episode: "Love Jungle"	
2014	Black Box	Dr. Farrah Mahmoud	Recurring role; 8 episodes	
2014	The Good Wife	Sylmar Knausgaard	Episode: "Old Spice"	
2014	Red Zone	Frida Moussaf	Television film	
2015	Forever	Melanie Sparo	Episode: "The Wolves of Deep Brooklyn"	
2015	The Blacklist	Mary Henning	Episode: "The Deer Hunter (no. 93)"	
2015	Limitless	Dr. Pauline Wilson	Episode: "Side Effects May Include..."	
2016	Elementary	Sofia Darrow	Episode: "All In"	
2016	Notorious	Megan Byrd	Main role; 10 episodes	
2017–2019	The Deuce	Loretta	Recurring role (seasons 1–2), Main role (season 3); 18 episodes	
2019–2023	The L Word: Generation Q	Gigi Ghorbani	Main role; 28 episodes	
2022	Black Bird	Lauren McCauley	Miniseries; 5 episodes	
2023	Class of '09	Hour Nazari	Miniseries; 8 episodes	
2023	Scavengers Reign	Mia	Voice role; 3 episodes	
2026–present	The Pitt	Dr. Baran Al-Hashimi	Main role; 15 episodes (season 2–present)	

== Awards and honors ==
Year	Award	Category	Work	Result	Ref.
2026	Primetime Emmy Awards	Outstanding Supporting Actress in a Drama Series	The Pitt	Nominated	
