= Fox 2000 Pictures =

American film studio

- Type: Division
- Industry: Entertainment industry
- Predecessors: FNM Films/Fox West Pictures
- Founded: January 7, 1994; 32 years ago Los Angeles, California, U.S.
- Founder: Laura Ziskin
- Defunct: May 14, 2021; 5 years ago
- Fate: Folded into 20th Century Studios
- Successor: 3000 Pictures (studio)
- Headquarters: Century City, Los Angeles, United States
- Key people: Elizabeth Gabler (president); Jessica Goodman (Executive vice president)
- Products: Motion pictures
- Parent: 20th Century Fox (1994–2019); The Walt Disney Studios (2019–2021)

Fox 2000 Pictures was an American film production company within the Walt Disney Studios. It was founded by Laura Ziskin on January 7, 1994, as a sister studio of the larger film studios 20th Century Fox and Fox Searchlight Pictures, specializing in producing independent films in mid-range releases that largely targeted underserved groups. The company dissolved on May 14, 2021, following the release of The Woman in the Window on Netflix, and the acquisition of 21st Century Fox by the Walt Disney Company on March 20, 2019.

Most films from Fox 2000 Pictures were released under the 20th Century Fox banner, and sometimes under Fox Searchlight Pictures. Walt Disney Studios Motion Pictures distributed the films produced by Fox 2000 Pictures in theatrical markets since 2019 until its closure in 2021.

Fox 2000 Pictures produced over 70 films. Fox 2000 Pictures' Life of Pi was nominated for 11 Academy Awards including Best Picture, ultimately winning four, and was the division's highest-grossing film with $609 million worldwide. Marley & Me was Fox 2000 Pictures' biggest commercial success with a record for the largest Christmas Day box office ever with $14.75 million in ticket sales.

== History ==
Fox 2000 Pictures formed as a division of 20th Century Fox in 1994 with Laura Ziskin as president. In May 1997, producer Art Linson moved his Knickerbocker Films banner from 20th Century Fox to Fox 2000 Pictures with a three-year exclusive production agreement.

In 2000, Ziskin left the division and Elizabeth Gabler was hired to replace her. In February 2012, Gabler renewed her contract as president of Fox 2000 Pictures.

Fox 2000 Pictures signed Karen Rosenfelt's Sunswept Entertainment to a first-look production deal. In July 2014, the division agreed to a three-year first-look production deal with Color Force, a production partnership of Nina Jacobson and Brad Simpson. The Jackal Group, a Fox Networks Group and Gail Berman partnership, signed a first-look feature film production deal with Fox 2000 Pictures for Berman in February 2015.

On March 20, 2019, The Walt Disney Company acquired 21st Century Fox, including Fox 2000 Pictures. Disney originally announced that Fox 2000 Pictures would continue operating after the acquisition, which gave Disney 11 film units. However, the next day, The Hollywood Reporter reported that Disney would shut down the studio in October 2019 after The Woman in the Window. Deadline Hollywood was surprised as Fox 2000 Pictures, considered to be ideal for streaming films, was the reason for the 21st Century Fox acquisition. However, Fox Searchlight Pictures was also an indie division leaving little room for Fox 2000 Pictures. In August 2019, The Art of Racing in the Rain became the final theatrical film of the studio. The division shut down on May 14, 2021, after The Woman in the Window was delayed twice, first due to re-editing after test screenings and then because of the COVID-19 pandemic. On August 4, 2020, Disney sold the film to Netflix.

== List of releases ==
Release date	Film title	Co-production with
July 12, 1996	Courage Under Fire	Davis Entertainment, Joseph M. Singer Entertainment and Friendly Films
December 20, 1996	One Fine Day	Lynda Obst Productions and Via Rosa Productions
April 4, 1997	Inventing the Abbotts	Imagine Entertainment
April 25, 1997	Volcano	Shuler Donner/Donner and Moritz Original
September 26, 1997	Soul Food	State Street Pictures
November 6, 1998	A Cool, Dry Place	
December 25, 1998	The Thin Red Line	Geisler-Roberdeau and Phoenix Pictures
March 19, 1999	Ravenous	Heyday Films
April 9, 1999	Never Been Kissed	Flower Films and Bushwood Pictures
April 23, 1999	Pushing Tin	Regency Enterprises
July 16, 1999	Lake Placid	Phoenix Pictures
August 13, 1999	Brokedown Palace	
September 10, 1999	Best Laid Plans	
October 15, 1999	Fight Club	Regency Enterprises
November 10, 1999	Light It Up	Edmonds Entertainment
November 12, 1999	Anywhere but Here	
December 17, 1999	Anna and the King	Lawrence Bender Productions
March 24, 2000	Here on Earth	
August 18, 2000	Sunset Strip	
November 10, 2000	Men of Honor	State Street Pictures
March 30, 2001	Someone Like You	Lynda Obst Productions
December 21, 2001	Joe Somebody	Regency Enterprises and Kopelson Entertainment
May 10, 2002	Unfaithful	Regency Enterprises
December 13, 2002	Drumline	
April 4, 2003	Phone Booth	Zucker/Netter Productions
April 16, 2003	Chasing Papi	Robert Simonds Productions and Spirit Dance Entertainment
May 16, 2003	Down with Love	Regency Enterprises and The Jinks/Cohen Company
February 6, 2004	Catch That Kid	Mediastream III, Mad Chance and Nimbus Film
April 23, 2004	Man on Fire	Regency Enterprises, New Regency Productions and Scott Free Productions
April 8, 2005	Fever Pitch	Conundrum Entertainment and Flower Films
September 23, 2005	Roll Bounce	State Street Pictures
October 7, 2005	In Her Shoes	Scott Free Productions and Deuce Three Productions
November 18, 2005	Walk the Line	Konrad Pictures, Tree Line Films and Catfish Productions
December 16, 2005	The Family Stone	
March 3, 2006	Aquamarine	Storefront Pictures
June 30, 2006	The Devil Wears Prada	Dune Entertainment
October 20, 2006	Flicka	
November 10, 2006	A Good Year	Scott Free Productions and Dune Entertainment
December 15, 2006	Eragon	Davis Entertainment, Dune Entertainment, Major Studio Partners and Ingenious Studio Partners
December 14, 2007	Alvin and the Chipmunks	Regency Enterprises, Bagdasarian Productions and Dune Entertainment
January 18, 2008	27 Dresses	Spyglass Entertainment and Dune Entertainment
December 25, 2008	Marley & Me	Regency Enterprises, Sunswept Entertainment and Dune Entertainment
January 9, 2009	Bride Wars	Regency Enterprises, New Regency Productions, Riche/Ludwig Productions, Birdie Productions and Dune Entertainment
September 4, 2009	All About Steve	Fortis Films, Radar Pictures and Dune Entertainment
December 23, 2009	Alvin and the Chipmunks: The Squeakquel	Regency Enterprises, Bagdasarian Productions, Dune Entertainment and Tall Trees Productions
February 12, 2010	Percy Jackson & the Olympians: The Lightning Thief	Dune Entertainment, 1492 Pictures and Sunswept Entertainment
March 19, 2010	Diary of a Wimpy Kid	Dune Entertainment and Color Force
July 23, 2010	Ramona and Beezus	Walden Media, Dune Entertainment and Di Novi Pictures
November 26, 2010	Love & Other Drugs	Regency Enterprises, New Regency Productions, Stuber Pictures, Bedford Falls Productions and Dune Entertainment
December 10, 2010	The Chronicles of Narnia: The Voyage of the Dawn Treader	Walden Media and Dune Entertainment
March 25, 2011	Diary of a Wimpy Kid: Rodrick Rules	Dune Entertainment and Color Force
April 22, 2011	Water for Elephants	3 Arts Entertainment, Flashpoint Entertainment, Dune Entertainment, Ingenious Media and Big Screen Productions
July 1, 2011	Monte Carlo	Regency Enterprises, Dune Entertainment and Di Novi Pictures
October 14, 2011	The Big Year	Red Hour Productions, Dune Entertainment, Deuce Three Productions and Sunswept Entertainment
December 16, 2011	Alvin and the Chipmunks: Chipwrecked	Regency Enterprises, Bagdasarian Productions and Dune Entertainment
August 3, 2012	Diary of a Wimpy Kid: Dog Days	Dune Entertainment and Color Force
October 26, 2012	Chasing Mavericks	Walden Media and Dune Entertainment
November 23, 2012	Life of Pi	Dune Entertainment
August 9, 2013	Percy Jackson: Sea of Monsters	Di Bonaventura Pictures, Sunswept Entertainment and 1492 Pictures
October 25, 2013	The Counselor	Scott Free Productions, Nick Wechsler Productions and Chockstone Pictures
November 8, 2013	The Book Thief	Sunswept Entertainment and Babelsberg Studios
February 7, 2014	The Monuments Men	Columbia Pictures, Babelsberg Studios and Smokehouse Pictures
June 6, 2014	The Fault in Our Stars	Temple Hill Entertainment
April 10, 2015	The Longest Ride	Temple Hill Entertainment
May 22, 2015	Poltergeist	Metro-Goldwyn-Mayer Pictures, Ghost House Pictures and Vertigo Entertainment
July 24, 2015	Paper Towns	Temple Hill Entertainment
October 16, 2015	Bridge of Spies	Touchstone Pictures, DreamWorks Pictures, Participant Media, Reliance Entertainment and Amblin Entertainment
December 18, 2015	Alvin and the Chipmunks: The Road Chip	Regency Enterprises and Bagdasarian Productions
December 25, 2015	Joy	Davis Entertainment and Annapurna Pictures
October 21, 2016	Keeping Up with the Joneses	Parkes+MacDonald Image Nation
December 25, 2016	Hidden Figures	Levantine Films and Chernin Entertainment
May 19, 2017	Diary of a Wimpy Kid: The Long Haul	Color Force
October 6, 2017	The Mountain Between Us	Chernin Entertainment
March 16, 2018	Love, Simon	Temple Hill Entertainment
October 19, 2018	The Hate U Give	Temple Hill Entertainment and State Street Pictures
April 17, 2019	Breakthrough	Franklin Entertainment; theatrical distribution by Walt Disney Studios Motion Pictures via 20th Century Fox
August 9, 2019	The Art of Racing in the Rain	Starbucks Entertainment, Original Film and Shifting Gears Productions; theatrical distribution by Walt Disney Studios Motion Pictures via 20th Century Fox
May 14, 2021	The Woman in the Window	Scott Rudin Productions; distributed by Netflix
