= Brad Simpson (producer) =

American film and television producer

- Education: Brown University
- Occupations: Film and TV producer Color Force partner slay
- Notable work: Diary of a Wimpy Kid; American Crime Story; Crazy Rich Asians

Bradford "Brad" Simpson is an American film and television producer and partner at Los Angeles-based film studio Color Force.

== Life and career ==
Simpson grew up in Little Rock, Arkansas, and graduated from Brown University.

He began his career at Killer Films, where he served as an executive and a producer. At Killer Films he co-produced Far from Heaven, Party Monster and A Home at the End of the World, and served as associate producer on Boys Don't Cry and Camp. He was also involved with independent films such as Velvet Goldmine, Hedwig and the Angry Inch, Happiness, and One Hour Photo.

From 2004 to 2007, Simpson served as President of Appian Way Productions, Leonardo DiCaprio's Warner Bros-based production company.

Simpson served as executive producer of Marc Forster's films Machine Gun Preacher in 2011 and World War Z in 2013. He also produced Diary of a Wimpy Kid, Diary of a Wimpy Kid: Rodrick Rules and Diary of a Wimpy Kid: Dog Days along with future producing partner, Nina Jacobson.

=== Color Force ===
In 2012, he joined Color Force as a partner. Later that year, Simpson and Nina Jacobson signed a first-look deal with FX Productions for original programs.

In 2016, FX aired The People v. O. J. Simpson: American Crime Story, produced by Color Force. Simpson won an Emmy Award for his work on the series the same year, as well as a Golden Globe. Simpson also won a BAFTA, a Critics' Choice award, a TCA award, and a Producers Guild of America award.

In 2016, FX Productions signed Simpson and Jacobson to an exclusive production deal for original programming.

In 2018, Simpson produced the second American Crime Story series, The Assassination of Gianni Versace: American Crime Story. For his work on The Assassination of Gianni Versace, Simpson received an Emmy award, a Golden Globe award, a Critics' Choice award, a TCA award, and a Producers Guild award. The same year, Simpson served as an executive producer on the FX series Pose.

Simpson produced Crazy Rich Asians and Ben Is Back with Jacobson in 2018.

He executive produced Richard Linklater's Where'd You Go, Bernadette (2019). Simpson executive produced The Goldfinch, an adaptation of Donna Tart's novel of the same name, and served as one of the executive producers on the television adaptation of Y: The Last Man for FX.

== Filmography ==
=== Film ===
Producer

- Party Monster (2003)
- Gardener of Eden (2007)
- Diary of a Wimpy Kid (2010)
- Diary of a Wimpy Kid: Rodrick Rules (2011)
- Diary of a Wimpy Kid: Dog Days (2012)
- Diary of a Wimpy Kid: The Long Haul (2017)
- Crazy Rich Asians (2018)
- Ben Is Back (2018)
- Where'd You Go, Bernadette (2019)
- The Goldfinch (2019)
- All Day and a Night (2020)
- The Hunger Games: The Ballad of Songbirds & Snakes (2023)
- The Hunger Games: Sunrise on the Reaping (2026)

Associate producer

- Boys Don't Cry (1999)
- Camp (2003)

Co-producer

- Far from Heaven (2002)
- A Home at the End of the World (2004)

Executive producer

- Machine Gun Preacher (2011)
- Disconnect (2012)
- World War Z (2013)
- Electric Slide (2014)
- Come Sunday (2018)

Miscellaneous crew

Year	Title	Role
1995	The Incredibly True Adventure of Two Girls in Love	Promotion coordinator
1997	Kiss Me, Guido	Production assistant: Additional unit
1998	Velvet Goldmine	Assistant production executive: Killer Films
2001	Hedwig and the Angry Inch	Head of development: Killer Films
2001	Series 7: The Contenders	Director of development: Killer Films
2001	The Grey Zone	Head of development: Killer Films

Thanks

- Chelsea Walls (2001)
- Band Aid (2017)

=== Television ===
Executive producer

Year	Title	Notes
2016–21	American Crime Story	
2016	Inside Look: The People v. O.J. Simpson - American Crime Story	Documentary
2016	The Infamous	TV pilot
2018–21	Pose	
2021	Y: The Last Man	
2023	Class of '09	
2024	Clipped	
