= Color Force =

American independent production company

- Type: Private
- Founded: 2007; 19 years ago
- Founder: Nina Jacobson
- Headquarters: West Hollywood, California, United States
- Owner: Nina Jacobson; Brad Simpson; (Partner)

Color Force is an American independent film and television production company founded in 2007 by producer and film executive Nina Jacobson after her 2006 termination as president of Disney's Buena Vista Motion Pictures Group. The company is named after the actual color force itself in quantum physics, which is an invisible force that binds opposing elementary particles together.

Its films include the Diary of a Wimpy Kid and The Hunger Games series. Color Force signed a three-year "first-look" production deal with DreamWorks in December 2006. In 2012, Brad Simpson became partner. Later that year, Color Force signed a first-look deal with FX Productions. In 2014, the company signed a first-look deal with 20th Century Fox.

In 2017, Jacobson and Simpson appointed Nellie Reed as head of Color Force's television productions. In 2024, the company signed an overall deal with Sony Pictures Entertainment.

== Filmography ==
=== Feature films ===
Title	Release date	Director	Distributed by	Co-production with	Budget	Gross
Diary of a Wimpy Kid	March 19, 2010	Thor Freudenthal	20th Century Fox	Fox 2000 Pictures and Dune Entertainment	$15 million	$118,182,020
Diary of a Wimpy Kid: Rodrick Rules	March 25, 2011	David Bowers	20th Century Fox	Fox 2000 Pictures and Dune Entertainment	$21 million	$87,378,502
One Day	August 19, 2011	Lone Scherfig	Focus Features	Random House Films and Film4 Productions	$15 million	$56,706,628
The Hunger Games	March 23, 2012	Gary Ross	Lionsgate		$78 million	$691,247,768
Diary of a Wimpy Kid: Dog Days	August 3, 2012	David Bowers	20th Century Fox	Fox 2000 Pictures and Dune Entertainment	$22 million	$77,112,176
The Hunger Games: Catching Fire	November 22, 2013	Francis Lawrence	Lionsgate		$130 million	$854,355,361
The Hunger Games: Mockingjay – Part 1	November 21, 2014	Francis Lawrence	Lionsgate		$125 million	$755,100,229
The Hunger Games: Mockingjay – Part 2	November 20, 2015	Francis Lawrence	Lionsgate		$160 million	$652,955,370
Diary of a Wimpy Kid: The Long Haul	May 19, 2017	David Bowers	20th Century Fox	Fox 2000 Pictures	$22 million	$24,380,215
Crazy Rich Asians	August 17, 2018	Jon M. Chu	Warner Bros. Pictures	Ivanhoe Pictures	$30 million	$231,310,201
Ben Is Back	December 7, 2018	Peter Hedges	Roadside Attractions; LD Entertainment; Lionsgate	30West and Black Bear Pictures	$13 million	$10 million
Where'd You Go, Bernadette	August 16, 2019	Richard Linklater	United Artists Releasing	Annapurna Pictures	$18 million	$10 million
The Goldfinch	September 13, 2019	John Crowley	Warner Bros. Pictures	Amazon Studios	$44 million	$9 million
All Day and a Night	May 1, 2020	Joe Robert Cole	Netflix	Mighty Engine		
The Hunger Games: The Ballad of Songbirds & Snakes	November 17, 2023	Francis Lawrence	Lionsgate	Good Universe	$100 million	$338 million
The Hunger Games: Sunrise on the Reaping	November 20, 2026	Francis Lawrence	Lionsgate		$150 million	$56 million

=== Upcoming films ===
Title	Release date	Director	Distributed by	Co-production with	Notes
China Rich Girlfriend	TBA		Warner Bros. Pictures	Ivanhoe Pictures	

=== Television ===
Title	Series Premiere	Series Finale	Creator(s)	Network	Co-production with	Note
American Crime Story	February 2, 2016	November 9, 2021	Scott Alexander and Larry Karaszewski	FX	Scott & Larry Productions, Ryan Murphy Television, FXP, and 20th Television; distributed by 20th Television (2016–18) / Disney Platform Distribution (2021-).	
Pose	June 3, 2018	June 6, 2021	Ryan Murphy, Brad Falchuk and Steven Canals	FX	Ryan Murphy Television, Brad Falchuk Teley-vision, 20th Television, and FXP; distributed by 20th Television (2018–19) / Disney Platform Distribution (2021).	
Y: The Last Man	September 13, 2021	November 1, 2021	Michael Green and Melina Matsoukas	FX on Hulu	Future Investigations, Witch's Mark Productions and FXP; distributed by Disney Platform Distribution.	
Class of '09	May 10, 2023	June 21, 2023	Tom Rob Smith	FX on Hulu	FXP; distributed by Disney Platform Distribution.	
Clipped	June 4, 2024	July 2, 2024	Gina Welch	FX on Hulu	Indistinct Chatter and FXP; distributed by Disney Platform Distribution.	
American Sports Story	September 17, 2024	November 12, 2024	Stu Zicherman	FX	Sleeping Indian, Inc., The Boston Globe, Wondery, Monarch Pictures, Ryan Murphy Television and 20th Television; distributed by Disney Platform Distribution	
Say Nothing	November 14, 2024		Josh Zetumer	FX on Hulu	Slingerland, Ludwig, and Rogers and FXP; distributed by Disney Platform Distribution	
Love Story	February 12, 2026	present	Connor Hines	FX; FX on Hulu	Ryan Murphy Television and 20th Television; distributed by Disney Platform Distribution	

=== Upcoming series ===
Title	Series Premiere	Creator(s)	Network	Co-production with	Note
The Shards	TBA	Ryan Murphy and Bret Easton Ellis	FX	Ryan Murphy Television, Sodium Fox Productions and 20th Television; distributed by Disney Platform Distribution	
