= Where'd You Go, Bernadette (film) =

2019 American comedy-drama film by Richard Linklater

- Theatrical release poster
- Directed by: Richard Linklater
- Screenplay by: Richard Linklater; Holly Gent; Vince Palmo
- Based on: Where'd You Go, Bernadette by Maria Semple
- Produced by: Nina Jacobson; Brad Simpson; Ginger Sledge
- Starring: Cate Blanchett; Billy Crudup; Kristen Wiig; Judy Greer; Laurence Fishburne
- Cinematography: Shane F. Kelly
- Edited by: Sandra Adair
- Music by: Graham Reynolds; Sam Lipman
- Production companies: Annapurna Pictures; Color Force; Detour Filmproduction
- Distributed by: United Artists Releasing
- Release date: August 16, 2019 (United States)
- Running time: 109 minutes
- Country: United States
- Language: English
- Budget: $18 million
- Box office: $11 million

Where'd You Go, Bernadette is a 2019 American comedy-drama film directed by Richard Linklater from a screenplay by Linklater, Holly Gent, and Vince Palmo, based on the 2012 novel of the same name by Maria Semple. It stars Cate Blanchett, Billy Crudup, Kristen Wiig, Judy Greer, and Laurence Fishburne.

Where'd You Go, Bernadette was released on August 16, 2019, by Annapurna Pictures through their United Artists Releasing joint venture. It received mixed reviews from critics.

== Plot ==
Architect-turned-agoraphobe Bernadette Fox is settled down with her husband Elgin "Elgie" Branch and their 15-year-old daughter Balakrishna "Bee" in a dilapidated former schoolhouse in Seattle. After an award-winning house Bernadette constructed was demolished, she developed severe depression and became reclusive. Despite her close relationship with Bee, Bernadette seldom leaves home and harbors a deep fear of human interaction, including with the other parents at Bee's school and especially their neighbor, Audrey Griffin.

Bee requests a family trip to Antarctica as a reward for good grades, to which her parents reluctantly agree. As the trip approaches, Bernadette's behavior becomes increasingly erratic and she considers using various prescription drugs to control her worsening anxiety and insomnia. Audrey dishonestly accuses Bernadette of driving over her foot, escalating the tension between them. Audrey continually implores Bernadette to remove an invasive blackberry plant from the hillside above her house; when Bernadette complies, the hillside collapses into Audrey's garden and house during a rainstorm. Elgie accuses Bernadette of knowing that the hill would collapse without the blackberries to hold it in place.

One day, Bernadette returns home to find Elgie, his assistant Soo-Lin, psychiatrist Dr. Kurtz, and FBI Agent Strang at her home for an intervention. They reveal that Manjula, Bernadette's "personal assistant" in India with whom she has shared all of her personal and financial information, is actually a front for a Russian criminal organization that the FBI has been watching. Dr. Kurtz and Elgie want to commit Bernadette to a psychiatric hospital while Elgie and Bee go to Antarctica. Feeling ambushed and misunderstood, Bernadette sneaks out of the house and hides at Audrey's, who makes amends with her and helps her fly to Antarctica alone.

Agent Strang tells Elgie that the Russian criminals, who were on their way to Seattle to defraud Bernadette while she and her family were away, have been arrested and are no longer a threat. After Audrey tells Bee that she drove Bernadette to the airport to go to Antarctica, Elgie and Bee pursue Bernadette. In Antarctica, Bernadette befriends Becky, a researcher who tells her that the research station at the South Pole is in need of an architect to completely rebuild it. Bernadette sneaks off her cruise ship and into Palmer Station and convinces the team leader to give her a spot on the next convoy to the South Pole.

Elgie realizes that he has failed Bernadette by not being more supportive of her creativity. He and Bee catch up with Bernadette at Palmer Station and, seeing that her passion for architecture has been reignited, give her their blessing to spend five weeks at the Pole.

== Cast ==
- Cate Blanchett as Bernadette Fox
- Billy Crudup as Elgie Branch
- Emma Nelson as Balakrishna "Bee" Branch
- Kristen Wiig as Audrey Griffin
- Zoë Chao as Soo-Lin Lee-Segal
- David Paymer as Jay Ross
- Megan Mullally as Judy Toll
- Laurence Fishburne as Paul Jellinek
- Steve Zahn as David Walker
- Judy Greer as Dr. Janelle Kurtz
- Kathryn Feeney as Tamara the Pharmacy Employee
- Richard Robichaux as Floyd the Pharmacist
- James Urbaniak as Agent Marcus Strang
- Jóhannes Haukur Jóhannesson as Captain J. Rouverol
- Troian Bellisario as Becky
- Claudia Doumit as Iris
- Katelyn Statton as Vivian
- Kate Burton as Ellen Idelson

== Production ==
In January 2013, Annapurna Pictures and Color Force acquired the rights to the film adaptation of the novel and set Scott Neustadter and Michael H. Weber to write the screenplay. Semple, Bryan Unkeless, and Ted Schipper executive produced. In February 2015, Richard Linklater was announced as director of the film, and Cate Blanchett was cast as Bernadette in November. In April 2016, it was announced that Holly Gent Palmo and Vince Palmo had taken over writing duties on the film, with Linklater also receiving credit.

In March 2017, Kristen Wiig joined the cast, and Billy Crudup was added in May, marking his second collaboration with Blanchett, after appearing with her in Charlotte Gray (2001). In June, Judy Greer, James Urbaniak, and Laurence Fishburne joined the cast of the film, and Troian Bellisario came on board in July. Emma Nelson's casting was announced in June 2018.

Principal photography began on July 10, 2017. Set in Seattle, filming took place in Pittsburgh and Vancouver. Scenes set in Antarctica were filmed in Greenland.

Graham Reynolds was announced as the film's composer in September 2017.

== Release ==
Originally scheduled for release in the USA on May 11, 2018, the film was later pushed back to October 19. The release date was then pushed to March 22, 2019, and then August 9, before finally settling on August 16, 2019.

The film was significantly delayed for release in the UK for two years due to the film’s huge under-performance, before eventually appearing on Amazon Prime Video and other streaming services on 15 March 2021.

== Reception ==
=== Box office ===
In the United States and Canada, Where'd You Go, Bernadette was released alongside Blinded by the Light, 47 Meters Down: Uncaged, and Good Boys, and was projected to gross around $5 million from 2,404 theaters in its opening weekend. It ended up making $1.2 million on its opening day, including $200,000 from Thursday night previews, and $3.5 million for the weekend, finishing 11th at the box office. By the end of its run, the film had grossed $9.2 million domestically and $11 million worldwide on a budget of $18 million.

=== Critical response ===
On Rotten Tomatoes, the film holds an approval rating of 50% based on 191 reviews, with an average rating of 5.8/10. The website's critical consensus reads, "Where'd You Go, Bernadette offers dispiriting proof that a talented director, bestselling source material, and terrific cast can add up to far less than the sum of their parts." On Metacritic, which uses a weighted average, the film has a score of 51 out of 100, based on 39 critics, indicating "mixed or average reviews". Audiences polled by CinemaScore gave the film an average grade of "B" on an A+ to F scale, while those at PostTrak gave it an average of 3.5 out of 5 stars and a 60% "definite recommend".

Richard Roeper of the Chicago Sun-Times gave the film 2 out of 4 stars and wrote: "Filmed in a solid but straightforward style, populated by troubled characters who are aggressively off-putting, frustratingly passive and/or easily lampooned clichés, Where'd You Go, Bernadette is one of the most disappointing movies of 2019." In his 1/4 star review for The Globe and Mail, Barry Hertz said, "There is, buried deep somewhere in Linklater's film or however many edits it may have undergone – the thing reeks of indecision – an insightful, even invigorating story about what happens to a creative genius once they stop creating. But the actual work presents a good argument that, for some artists, it might be best to quit while you're ahead."

=== Accolades ===
Year	Award	Category	Recipient	Result	Ref.
2020	77th Golden Globe Awards	Best Actress in a Motion Picture – Musical or Comedy	Cate Blanchett	Nominated	
2020	Women Film Critics Circle	Best Actress	Cate Blanchett	Nominated	
2020	Austin Film Critics Association	Austin Film Award	Richard Linklater	Nominated	

== Architecture ==
Two of Bernadette's structures — the fictitious Twenty-Mile House and Beeber Bifocal House — were compared to the first two of 18 visions of Bernadette Soubirous.

Her final conception in the film was based on the Halley Research Station, designed in real life by Hugh Broughton Architects.
