= Flesh Impact =

2026 American short film

- Promotional teaser poster
- Directed by: Maggie Gyllenhaal
- Written by: Maggie Gyllenhaal
- Produced by: William Green; Michelle Ross; Nicolette Spencer; Melissa Moore
- Starring: Ellen Burstyn; Dakota Johnson; Peter Sarsgaard; Sepideh Moafi
- Cinematography: Lawrence Sher
- Edited by: Affonso Gonçalves
- Music by: Dickon Hinchliffe
- Production companies: The Cut; Superprime; Innocean
- Release date: September 7, 2026 (Venice)
- Running time: 17 minutes
- Country: United States
- Language: English

Flesh Impact is a 2026 American short drama film written and directed by Maggie Gyllenhaal. It stars Ellen Burstyn and Dakota Johnson respectively as older and younger fictional versions of Marilyn Monroe.

Flesh Impact had its world premiere out of competition at the 83rd Venice International Film Festival on September 7, 2026.

== Plot ==
A mysterious elderly woman auditions at a small New York City black box theater. As she shares her acting credentials and experience, hidden truths about her identity and misconceptions about her past begin to surface.

== Cast ==
- Ellen Burstyn as Marilyn Monroe
- Dakota Johnson as Marilyn Monroe
- Peter Sarsgaard as the director
- Sepideh Moafi as the casting director

== Production ==
While Gyllenhaal was working on the post-production of The Bride!, she was approached by Genesis to make a short film for Marilyn Monroe's centennial, and she took a weekend to conceive a plot, eventually imagining her at 100 finally able to express herself as an artist.

The title is a citation of a Billy Wilder's description of Monroe's screen presence.

== Release ==
The film had its world premiere out competition at the 83rd Venice International Film Festival on September 7, 2026.

== Reception ==
Steve Pond from TheWrap compared the film to the director's previous work The Bride!, noting "Flesh Impact gives Gyllenhaal another complex heroine to consider, but the film itself is gentler, imbued with more sorrow than anger" and "it’s a lovely reverie delivered by a ghost, but it also has bite". Hayley Croke from Loud And Clear Reviews described it as "both a clear love letter to those who dedicate their lives to the craft and an apology to those who waded the waters of the entertainment industry unprotected by the powers that be". Nicholas Barber from BBC Online called the film a "warm-hearted 17-minute charmer".

British Vogue's Radhika Seth criticized the film, calling it "elusive" and noting it is "admirable in wanting to move beyond the legend of Marilyn. But, with its own fairytale-like structure, it can’t help but flatten her, too, creating its own kind of myth."
