= The People v. O. J. Simpson: American Crime Story =

Season 1 of "American Crime Story"

- Promotional poster
- Starring: Sterling K. Brown; Kenneth Choi; Christian Clemenson; Cuba Gooding Jr.; Bruce Greenwood; Nathan Lane; Sarah Paulson; David Schwimmer; John Travolta; Courtney B. Vance
- No. of episodes: 10

Release
- Original network: FX
- Original release: February 2 – April 5, 2016

Season chronology
- Next → The Assassination of Gianni Versace

The first season of American Crime Story, titled The People v. O. J. Simpson, revolves around the murder trial of O. J. Simpson, as well as the combination of prosecution confidence, defense witnesses, and the Los Angeles Police Department's history with African-American people. It is based on Jeffrey Toobin's book The Run of His Life: The People v. O. J. Simpson (1997).

The ensemble cast includes Sterling K. Brown, Kenneth Choi, Christian Clemenson, Cuba Gooding Jr., Bruce Greenwood, Nathan Lane, Sarah Paulson, David Schwimmer, John Travolta, and Courtney B. Vance. O. J. Simpson, Nicole Brown Simpson, Bill Clinton, Barbara Walters, Rodney King, and Penny Daniels appear via archive footage.

Cable channel FX announced American Crime Story in October 2014 and filming began in May 2015. Broadcast between February 2 and April 5, 2016, the first season was developed by Scott Alexander and Larry Karaszewski. The two served as executive producer alongside Ryan Murphy, Brad Falchuk, Nina Jacobson, and Brad Simpson.

The People v. O. J. Simpson received critical acclaim for its directing, writing, and casting, particularly Paulson, Vance and Brown, though reactions to Travolta and Gooding's performances were more polarized. Among its awards, the season won nine Emmy Awards, two Golden Globe Awards, three TCA Awards, and four Critics' Choice Television Awards. Paulson won six awards for her performance.

== Cast ==
=== Main ===
- Sterling K. Brown as Christopher Darden
- Kenneth Choi as Judge Lance Ito
- Christian Clemenson as William Hodgman
- Cuba Gooding Jr. as O. J. Simpson
- Bruce Greenwood as Gil Garcetti
- Nathan Lane as F. Lee Bailey
- Sarah Paulson as Marcia Clark
- David Schwimmer as Robert Kardashian
- John Travolta as Robert Shapiro
- Courtney B. Vance as Johnnie Cochran

=== Recurring ===
- Keesha Sharp as Dale Cochran
- Chris Bauer as Det. Tom Lange
- Angel Parker as Shawn Chapman
- Selma Blair as Kris Jenner
- Jordana Brewster as Denise Brown
- Connie Britton as Faye Resnick
- Garrett M. Brown as Lou Brown
- Chris Conner as Jeffrey Toobin
- Kelly Dowdle as Nicole Brown Simpson
- Asia Monet Ray as Sydney Simpson
- Bonita Friedericy as Patti Goldman
- Dale Godboldo as Carl E. Douglas
- Jessica Blair Herman as Kim Goldman
- Evan Handler as Alan Dershowitz
- Larry King as himself
- Jake Koeppl as Ron Goldman
- Cheryl Ladd as Linell Shapiro
- Billy Magnussen as Kato Kaelin
- Rob Morrow as Barry Scheck
- Robert Morse as Dominick Dunne
- Michael McGrady as Det. Phillip Vannatter
- Steven Pasquale as Det. Mark Fuhrman
- Leonard Roberts as Dennis Schatzman
- Joseph Siravo as Fred Goldman
- Malcolm-Jamal Warner as Al Cowlings

=== Guest ===
- Marguerite Moreau as Laura McKinny
- Angie Patterson as Paula Barbieri
- Kwame Patterson as Michael Darden
- Romy Rosemont as Jill Shively
- Duane Shepard Sr. as Mr. Darden
- Beau Wirick as Allan Park
- Ken Lerner as Howard Weitzman
- Morgan Bastin as Khloe Kardashian
- Isabella Balbi as Kourtney Kardashian
- Nicolas Bechtel as Rob Kardashian
- Veronica Galvez as Kim Kardashian

=== Archive footage/audio ===
- O. J. Simpson
- Nicole Brown Simpson
- Bill Clinton
- Oprah Winfrey
- Barbara Walters
- Rodney King
- Penny Daniels
- Bob Costas

== Episodes ==
No. overall	No. in season	Title	Directed by	Written by	Original release date	Prod. code	US viewers (millions)
1	1	"From the Ashes of Tragedy"	Ryan Murphy	Scott Alexander & Larry Karaszewski	February 2, 2016	1WAX01	5.12
On the late evening of June 12, 1994, Nicole Brown Simpson and Ron Goldman are found stabbed to death outside her Brentwood condominium. Detective Tom Lange calls Brown's ex-husband, former NFL player and actor O. J. Simpson, who does not ask how she died. Simpson becomes a person of interest as deputy district attorney Marcia Clark learns that he physically abused Brown multiple times. As defense attorney Johnnie Cochran challenges Christopher Darden for not standing up for his race as a prosecutor, the LAPD questions Simpson, who gives vague responses for the day of the murders. Jill Shively saw Simpson driving away from the site of the murders. Limousine driver Allan Park notes Simpson's not responding to the intercom and a shadowy figure enter the house and Simpson’s Bronco not originally being parked at his house. Robert Kardashian talks Simpson into hiring litigator Robert Shapiro as his new attorney. Simpson later fails a polygraph test. Clark decides to charge Simpson after DNA results indicate his guilt; Kardashian finds Simpson with a gun, seemingly considering suicide, and attempts to calm him down. Officers arrive to take Simpson into custody; Simpson flees with longtime friend and fellow NFL player Al Cowlings in Cowlings' white Ford Bronco.
2	2	"The Run of His Life"	Ryan Murphy	Scott Alexander & Larry Karaszewski	February 9, 2016	1WAX02	3.90
District Attorney Gil Garcetti issues a statewide manhunt for Simpson, while Shapiro and Kardashian read Simpson's suicide letter. Shapiro holds a press conference to save face, with Kardashian reading the letter to the press. Simpson is spotted on the I-405; notified, the LAPD initiate a low-speed chase that is broadcast live on TV. Simpson orders Cowlings to drive him to Brentwood, where he appears to act conflicted as to whether to kill himself; Kardashian ultimately calms him down and asks that he surrender. Simpson complies and is taken into custody.
3	3	"The Dream Team"	Anthony Hemingway	Daniel Vincent DeVincentis	February 16, 2016	1WAX03	3.34
Shapiro begins assembling his defense team. Simpson is to be prosecuted for the murders; he is eligible for the death penalty. Garcetti later chooses to recommend a life sentence, because of Simpson's popularity. Clark reveals the evidence to the media. A TIME magazine cover that appears to feature a darkened image of Simpson raises issues of racism in the media. Shapiro signs F. Lee Bailey onto the team, who recommends hiring noted attorney Alan Dershowitz. Dershowitz mentions that they could argue that the DNA found at the crime scene could have been tampered with. They make this a key to the defense, after learning that Mark Fuhrman, a detective involved in the case, made several racist comments during his career. Deciding to frame the defense with the argument that the LAPD is systemically racist and framed Simpson for racial reasons, Shapiro talks to Jeffrey Toobin, a reporter from The New Yorker. He later publishes this exchange. Simpson agrees to hire Johnnie Cochran as the final member of his team. Meanwhile, most of the prosecution's key evidence is leaked to the media. Clark decides not to use Shively as a witness when she sells her story to a tabloid TV show.
4	4	"100% Not Guilty"	Anthony Hemingway	Maya Forbes & Wallace Wolodarsky and Scott Alexander & Larry Karaszewski	February 23, 2016	1WAX04	3.00
The defense adopts a strategy of objecting to the prosecution's every request, no matter how small, in order to put pressure on the prosecution. Judge Lance Ito is called to preside over the trial, and the process of jury selection begins. The prosecution's research shows a strong racial divide, with many whites believing OJ is guilty and African-Americans believing OJ is innocent. The research also shows Clark is viewed unfavorably by most jurors. Faye Resnick's book is published, which details Brown's lifestyle and relationship to Simpson and further spreads misinformation to potential jurors. Shapiro begins to push for a plea deal; however, Bailey and Cochran agree they will push for trial. At Kardashian's urging Simpson makes Cochran the lead attorney, sidelining Shapiro. Clark and Garcetti decide that they need to add a black lawyer to the prosecution to buffer the effect of the charismatic Cochran. She calls on Christopher Darden, who joins the prosecution team.
5	5	"The Race Card"	John Singleton	Joe Robert Cole	March 1, 2016	1WAX05	2.73
In 1982, while working as assistant DA for LA County, Cochran is pulled over and almost arrested in front of his children by a racist officer for no reason. He barely avoids being taken into custody before the officer understands who he is. Cochran is inspired to return to private practice by this incident. In January 1995, the Simpson murder trial begins. Shapiro unsuccessfully attempts to have Simpson's prior domestic violence history excluded from trial. Darden then asks Judge Ito prevent the use of the "N-word" from being used during the trial as it will be too inflammatory for the black jurors. Cochran delivers a fiery rebuttal lambasting Darden's argument as racist for assuming black jurors are so emotionally unstable. Clark assigns Darden to interview Mark Fuhrman and coach him on how to speak during the trial as a credible witness. Darden gets a bad feeling about Fuhrman, suspecting him to be a racist, as suggested by his murky history and superficiality, but Clark disregards his suspicions. Preparing for the jury to visit Simpson and Brown's homes as part of a crime-scene visit, Cochran redecorates Simpson's house with African-themed artwork and artifacts. Cochran also removes photos of white friends and family from Simpson's home, replacing them with photos of African-Americans. Hodgeman has a heart attack after strenuously objecting when Cochran mentions witnesses in his opening statement that the defense did not inform the prosecution about. Clark declines Garcetti's offer for a new prosecutor and keeps Darden as her second chair. A new obstacle emerges for the prosecution, when Fuhrman is shown to have Nazi memorabilia.
6	6	"Marcia, Marcia, Marcia"	Ryan Murphy	Daniel Vincent DeVincentis	March 8, 2016	1WAX06	3.00
Clark is going through a bitter divorce. The media regularly criticizes her attitude and appearance, and she becomes overwhelmed by this sudden celebrity status. Television networks interrupt daytime programming for coverage of the trial. Darden and Clark bond at the office after-hours with drinks and dancing. A reporter from the Los Angeles Times confronts Cochran about alleged past domestic violence against his first wife, leading Cochran to offer her money in exchange for silence which the reporter accepts. Clark gets a different hair style in an effort to lessen criticism about her appearance, but it is not well received. Back in court, Bailey cross-examines Fuhrman, repeatedly asking him if he has ever used the word "nigger" in the last ten years to describe African Americans, which Fuhrman strongly denies. Darden consoles Clark, who bemoans being turned into a public personality like the flashy defense lawyers despite the fact she never wanted to be.
7	7	"Conspiracy Theories"	Anthony Hemingway	Daniel Vincent DeVincentis	March 15, 2016	1WAX07	2.89
Shapiro attempts to blackmail Kardashian into helping him convince Simpson to make a plea deal, implying he unintentionally helped hide the knife Simpson used to kill Brown and Goldman when he took a bag of clothes from OJ's house at OJ's behest. After finding no knife or any bloodied clothing in the bag, Kardashian confesses to Cowlings he is concerned that there are no other suspects and no one seems to be looking for any, revealing he is starting to believe in Simpson's guilt. Meanwhile, Clark travels to Oakland with Darden for a friend's birthday, showing their increasing closeness; while having drinks with his friends one tells Clark he believes Fuhrman framed Simpson and planted the glove. When Clark begins to elaborate on Simpson being framed, she points out numerous inconsistencies with the theory, until even Darden's friends accept it sounds far-fetched. Darden's friends encourage him to begin a relationship with Clark; however, Darden chooses not to even when Clark seems interested. Back in court, Darden asks Clark to have Simpson try the gloves but she refuses, saying it is too risky. Shapiro discovers the gloves are too small for him and his hands are smaller than Simpson's. The defense counsel successfully baits Darden into asking Simpson to try on the leather gloves found at the crime scene. Simpson tries on the leather gloves; after he seemingly struggles to put on the gloves, they appear to be too small to fit him. Cochran congratulates Shapiro for his successful gambit.
8	8	"A Jury in Jail"	Anthony Hemingway	Joe Robert Cole	March 22, 2016	1WAX08	2.91
By April 1995, the members of the jury start to go stir-crazy and deal with cabin fever during sequestration. A few black jurors are excused for having lied on the questionnaire or having had some kind of connections with Simpson, leading Cochran to accuse Clark of trying to remove black jurors. Cochran responds by having white jurors removed. When both sides realize this may cause a mistrial, Cochran and Clark agree to stop. After the glove debacle, people begin to believe in Simpson's innocence. But when Clark presents the DNA evidence in court, doubts arise again. Kardashian approaches Cochran with his concerns over the mounting evidence and Simpson's lack of interest in finding who really killed Brown and Goldman; Cochran assures Kardashian the real killers will be found, though Kardashian is skeptical. Kardashian then approaches defense DNA expert Barry Scheck about the DNA evidence; Shenk assures him he will show that the DNA evidence is faulty. Shenk counters the DNA evidence by pointing out numerous flaws in the handling and gathering of the DNA evidence while also implying the DNA evidence could have been planted or fabricated. The cross-examination of the prosecution's forensic analyst Mr. Fung ends in a bizarre moment when Fung shakes hands with both the prosecution and defense, including Simpson himself. Clark realizes the DNA evidence she believed would convict Simpson has not convinced the jury and angrily melts down in her office.
9	9	"Manna from Heaven"	Anthony Hemingway	Scott Alexander & Larry Karaszewski	March 29, 2016	1WAX09	2.76
Shapiro's private investigator discovers audio tapes of Fuhrman recounting stories of misconduct during his time at the LAPD, including torturing, framing, and falsely accusing black suspects. Cochran and Bailey successfully get Judge Ito to subpoena the tapes and convince a North Carolina court to enforce the subpoena. The prosecutors attempt to keep the tapes out of the case, but the tapes show Fuhrman lied about using the word "nigger". Another issues arises when the tapes show Fuhrman insulting his former superior, police Captain Peggy York, who previously disciplined Fuhrman personally. She is married to Judge Ito. In pretrial proceedings she had denied having any connections to Fuhrman so that Ito could preside over the case, but now it appears she may have lied. Judge Ito allows another judge to determine if he can still be fair and that judge rules Ito can remain on the case, avoiding a mistrial. Judge Ito allows the defense to play the tapes in open court for the media, but only allows two parts of the tape where Fuhrman uses the word "nigger" to be played for the jury (only to show Fuhrman lied). Cochran is outraged by the decision. The defense calls Fuhrman back to the stand, where he invokes his 5th amendment right when Cochran begins questioning him. When Cochran asks if Fuhrman planted any evidence in this case, Fuhrman again invokes his 5th Amendment right rather than denying the allegation in a particularly damaging moment for the prosecution.
10	10	"The Verdict"	Ryan Murphy	Scott Alexander & Larry Karaszewski	April 5, 2016	1WAX10	3.27
In October 1995, on the last day of proceedings, Simpson declines to take the stand but makes a small statement where he says he would defend himself but wants the trial to end for everyone's sake. Clark and Darden deliver closing statements focused on the evidence. Cochran delivers a fiery closing statement arguing that this case is part of a pattern of persecution by the LAPD against African-Americans, and the jury should send a message by voting not guilty. Following four hours of deliberation, the jury delivers a "not guilty" verdict. Despite being dumbstruck with the whole process, Marcia Clark and Chris Darden acknowledge that it was delivered out of vengeance for the racism within the LAPD. After the verdict, Shapiro immediately denounces Cochran and the defense team for making the case about race, claiming he wanted to avoid playing "the racecard". Cochran attempts to make peace with Darden and while Darden accepts, he tells Cochran that winning a case on behalf of a rich black man will do nothing to help regular African-Americans in the US. Cochran celebrates with his law firm and is later both shocked and delighted to see that the Department of Justice has begun investigating the LAPD's systemic racism and President Clinton talking about the verdict. Simpson returns to civilian life, but although his family and Cowlings welcome him with open arms, he discovers many old friends have severed all ties with him, he is ostracised by his predominantly white neighbors in his wealthy enclave, and his favorite establishments ban him as a customer. At his celebration party, Simpson reads aloud a note declaring his intent to find the real killer, which is met by awkward applause from the crowd. This is too much for Kardashian, who finally turns his back on Simpson and leaves him and the party. Realizing that, although he's been found not guilty, he has been forever tarnished by this ordeal, Simpson walks into the backyard and stares at the statue of himself in his prime, pondering his legacy.

== Production ==
=== Development ===
On October 7, 2014, it was announced that FX had ordered a 10-episode season of American Crime Story, developed by Scott Alexander and Larry Karaszewski, and executive produced by Alexander and Karaszewski, as well as Ryan Murphy and Brad Falchuk. Murphy also directed the pilot episode. Other executive producers are Nina Jacobson and Brad Simpson. Co-executive producers are Anthony Hemingway and D. V. DeVincentis. All 10 episodes were expected to be written by Alexander and Karaszewski. The series was previously in development at Fox but since moved to the company's sibling cable network FX. Murphy and others wanted to create an unbiased account of the trial by doing "certain takes guilty, certain takes innocent" according to Cuba Gooding Jr so that they would have a "plethora of emotions to play with".

=== Casting ===
Cuba Gooding Jr. and Sarah Paulson were the first to be cast as Simpson and Marcia Clark, respectively. Subsequently, David Schwimmer was cast as Robert Kardashian. In January 2015, it was reported that John Travolta had joined the cast as Robert Shapiro; he would also serve as producer. In February 2015, Courtney B. Vance joined the series as Johnnie Cochran. In March 2015, it was announced that Connie Britton would co-star as Faye Resnick. April 2015 saw the casting of Sterling K. Brown as Christopher Darden, Jordana Brewster as Denise Brown, and Kenneth Choi as Judge Lance Ito. In May 2015, it was confirmed Selma Blair would be portraying Kris Kardashian Jenner. In July 2015, it was announced Nathan Lane had joined the cast as F. Lee Bailey.

=== Filming ===
Principal photography began on May 14, 2015, in Los Angeles, California.

== Promotion ==
In October 2015, FX released its first promotional trailer for The People v. O. J. Simpson, showing an Akita dog whining, walking from its residence onto a sidewalk to bark, then walking back to its residence, leaving behind bloody paw prints. Later that month another teaser was released, wherein the first actual footage of Travolta as Shapiro was shown. In the teaser, Shapiro is about to ask Simpson (whose face is unseen) if he is responsible for the murder of Simpson's ex-wife. In the next short teaser that was released, Simpson (again unseen) is taking a lie detector test.

In November, two new teasers were released. The first shows Simpson writing his attempted suicide letter, while a voice-over by Gooding Jr. narrates. The second shows the police chasing Simpson's white Ford Bronco, while dozens of fans cheer for him.

The first full trailer was released in December, along with a poster for the season. The trailer included Simpson sitting in the childhood bedroom of Kim Kardashian and contemplating suicide while Robert Kardashian tries to stop him.

== Reception ==
=== Reviews ===
The People v. O.J. Simpson received acclaim from critics. The review aggregator Rotten Tomatoes gave the season an approval rating of 97%, based on 89 reviews, with an average rating of 8.74/10. The site's critical consensus read, "The People v. O. J. Simpson: American Crime Story brings top-shelf writing, directing, and acting to bear on a still-topical story while shedding further light on the facts—and provoking passionate responses along the way." On Metacritic, the season has a score of 90 out of 100, based on 45 critics, indicating "universal acclaim".

Many critics singled out many cast members for the performances, particularly Paulson and Vance. Dan Feinberg of The Hollywood Reporter praised the performances of Paulson and Vance, writing: "As Clark's discomfort grows, Paulson's collection of tics seem more and more human, [...] Vance's Cochran is sometimes hilarious, but he has a dynamic range such that he's occasionally introspective and always intelligent as well." Brian Lowry of Variety praised the casting of the smaller roles, particularly Connie Britton as Faye Resnick and Nathan Lane as F. Lee Bailey.

Travolta and Gooding's respective portrayals of Shapiro and Simpson were met with mixed reviews by critics. Brian Lowry of Variety called Travolta "awful" in the role, adding: "Yes, Shapiro spoke in stiff, measured tones, but the actor's overly mannered line readings turn the attorney into a buffoon, in sharp contrast to the more nuanced portrayals around him." Nicole Jones of Vanity Fair called his performance "campy and calculated". Dan Feinberg of The Hollywood Reporter also criticized his performance, calling it "a mesmerizingly bad performance from the eyebrows down." He also wrote that "His unnecessary accent varies by episode, and Travolta's laser intensity feels arch and almost kabuki at times, turning Shapiro into a terrifying character from the next American Horror Story installment, rather than a part of this ensemble."

Maureen Ryan of Vanity Fair, conversely, became more impressed with Travolta as the season progressed: "I started in the realm of puzzled disbelief, arrived at amusement, and ultimately traveled to a place of sincere appreciation. You simply can't take your eyes off Travolta, and that is a form of enchantment." Elisabeth Garber-Paul of Rolling Stone also called it "arguably [Travolta's] best performance since" Pulp Fiction. Robert Bianco of USA Today wrote that Travolta's was the show's "broadest performance".

Dave Schilling of The Guardian panned Gooding's performance, writing: "his whiny, gravely voice sounds absolutely nothing like the real O. J. Simpson's deep, commanding tones." Michael Starr of New York Post also was highly critical of Gooding's performance, saying that he "portrays Simpson as a hollow, sad-sack cipher who speaks in a high-pitched whine and sleepwalks in a fog he never shakes after being arrested for the brutal double murder of ex-wife Nicole Brown and Ron Goldman. He's a forgettable, annoying presence in what should be a showcase role for Gooding—who, to be fair, is reciting lines written for him, so he can only do so much with the material."

On the other hand, Joe McGovern was more positive on Gooding's performance, writing that his casting "takes a risk and pulls it off." Elisabeth Garber-Paul of Rolling Stone described his performance as "an unnervingly believable take on a potential psychopath with teetering sanity." Nick Venable of Cinema Blend also opined that Gooding's turn as Simpson "could indeed get him on a shortlist of Emmy nominees."

In spite of the mixed reviews for their performances, Gooding and Travolta received Emmy nominations. Travolta was also nominated as one of the producers of the show in the Outstanding Limited Series category, which he ultimately won. Gooding's nomination was criticized by some reviewers.

=== Reaction from individuals involved ===
Mark Fuhrman, who is portrayed by Steven Pasquale, refused to watch the series and called his portrayal untruthful. In an interview with New York Post, he said, "The last 20 years, I have watched the facts dismissed by the media, journalists and the public simply because it does not fit within the politically correct narrative. At this late date, FX is attempting to establish a historical artifact with this series without reaching out to any prosecution sources. In a time when Americans read less and less and investigative journalism is on vacation, it is sad that this movie will be the historical word on this infamous trial. After all, it was 'based on a true story.'"

Marcia Clark praised the series and called Sarah Paulson's portrayal of her "phenomenal". During an interview on The Wendy Williams Show, Clark admitted that she watched the series with friends "to keep me from jumping off the balcony", and that she was emotionally unable to watch the series' recreation of Fuhrman's testimony. Clark also said her sons were only able to watch the first episode. Clark went to the Emmys with Sarah Paulson, who won that night for her performance.

The families of Brown and Goldman expressed anger at the show. Nicole Brown's sister, Tanya Brown, lashed out at the cast members for what she saw as a lack of consultation with the families. Ron Goldman's father, Fred Goldman, expressed numerous criticisms of the series even though they were portrayed sympathetically. Among them was his statement that the series did not devote enough material to his son, who is only depicted on the show as a corpse. He expressed concern that the generations of people who were too young to understand the events at the time would assume the series' depiction of events was accurate. Goldman's family also criticized the series for not depicting the murders, as they believe that Goldman died trying to save Brown from her attacker and that he was the man who eyewitnesses heard shouting that night. Goldman's sister, Kim, criticized the series for sympathetic portrayals of Simpson and Kardashian, despite the fact that in real life, Kardashian had admitted to having had actual doubts about Simpson's innocence and eventually severed his ties with him.

=== Ratings ===
Viewership and ratings per episode of The People v. O. J. Simpson: American Crime Story
No.	Title	Air date	Rating/share (18–49)	Viewers (millions)	DVR (18–49)	DVR viewers (millions)	Total (18–49)	Total viewers (millions)
1	"From the Ashes of Tragedy"	February 2, 2016	2.0	5.11	1.6	3.86	3.6	8.97
2	"The Run of His Life"	February 9, 2016	1.5	3.89	1.9	4.37	3.4	8.26
3	"The Dream Team"	February 16, 2016	1.3	3.33	1.6	3.45	2.9	6.78
4	"100% Not Guilty"	February 23, 2016	1.3	2.99	1.4	3.35	2.7	6.34
5	"The Race Card"	March 1, 2016	1.1	2.72	2.0	4.28	3.1	7.00
6	"Marcia, Marcia, Marcia"	March 8, 2016	1.2	3.00	1.8	4.03	3.0	7.03
7	"Conspiracy Theories"	March 15, 2016	1.2	2.89	1.7	3.88	2.9	6.77
8	"A Jury in Jail"	March 22, 2016	1.2	2.91	1.3	3.01	2.5	5.92
9	"Manna from Heaven"	March 29, 2016	1.1	2.76	1.8	3.99	2.9	6.75
10	"The Verdict"	April 5, 2016	1.3	3.27	1.6	3.51	2.9	6.78

== Accolades ==
Year	Association	Category	Nominated artist/work	Result
2016	68th Primetime Emmy Awards			
2016	68th Primetime Emmy Awards	Outstanding Limited or Anthology Series	The People v. O. J. Simpson: American Crime Story	Won
2016	68th Primetime Emmy Awards	Outstanding Lead Actor in a Limited Series or Movie	Courtney B. Vance	Won
2016	68th Primetime Emmy Awards	Outstanding Lead Actor in a Limited Series or Movie	Cuba Gooding Jr.	Nominated
2016	68th Primetime Emmy Awards	Outstanding Lead Actress in a Limited Series or Movie	Sarah Paulson	Won
2016	68th Primetime Emmy Awards	Outstanding Supporting Actor in a Limited Series or Movie	Sterling K. Brown (for "Manna from Heaven")	Won
2016	68th Primetime Emmy Awards	Outstanding Supporting Actor in a Limited Series or Movie	David Schwimmer (for "Conspiracy Theories")	Nominated
2016	68th Primetime Emmy Awards	Outstanding Supporting Actor in a Limited Series or Movie	John Travolta (for "100% Not Guilty")	Nominated
2016	68th Primetime Emmy Awards	Outstanding Directing for a Limited Series or Movie	Ryan Murphy (for "From the Ashes of Tragedy")	Nominated
2016	68th Primetime Emmy Awards	Outstanding Directing for a Limited Series or Movie	John Singleton (for "The Race Card")	Nominated
2016	68th Primetime Emmy Awards	Outstanding Directing for a Limited Series or Movie	Anthony Hemingway (for "Manna from Heaven")	Nominated
2016	68th Primetime Emmy Awards	Outstanding Writing for a Limited Series or Movie	Scott Alexander & Larry Karaszewski (for "From the Ashes of Tragedy")	Nominated
2016	68th Primetime Emmy Awards	Outstanding Writing for a Limited Series or Movie	Joe Robert Cole (for "The Race Card")	Nominated
2016	68th Primetime Emmy Awards	Outstanding Writing for a Limited Series or Movie	D. V. DeVincentis (for "Marcia, Marcia, Marcia")	Won
2016	68th Primetime Creative Arts Emmy Awards			
2016	68th Primetime Creative Arts Emmy Awards	Outstanding Casting for a Limited Series, Movie, or Special	Jeanne McCarthy, Nicole Abellera Hallman, Courtney Bright, and Nicole Daniels	Won
2016	68th Primetime Creative Arts Emmy Awards	Outstanding Cinematography for a Limited Series or Movie	Nelson Cragg (for "From the Ashes of Tragedy")	Nominated
2016	68th Primetime Creative Arts Emmy Awards	Outstanding Period Costumes	Hala Bahmet, Marina Ray, and Elinor Bardach (for "Marcia, Marcia, Marcia")	Nominated
2016	68th Primetime Creative Arts Emmy Awards	Outstanding Hairstyling for a Limited Series or Movie	Chris Clark, Natalie Driscoll, Shay Sanford-Fong, and Katrina Chevalier	Won
2016	68th Primetime Creative Arts Emmy Awards	Outstanding Makeup (Non-Prosthetic)	Eryn Krueger Mekash, Zoe Hay, Heather Plott, Deborah Huss Humphries, Luis Garcia, and Becky Cotton	Nominated
2016	68th Primetime Creative Arts Emmy Awards	Outstanding Single-Camera Picture Editing for a Limited Series or Movie	Adam Penn (for "From the Ashes of Tragedy")	Nominated
2016	68th Primetime Creative Arts Emmy Awards	Outstanding Single-Camera Picture Editing for a Limited Series or Movie	C. Chi-Yoon Chung (for "The Race Card")	Won
2016	68th Primetime Creative Arts Emmy Awards	Outstanding Single-Camera Picture Editing for a Limited Series or Movie	Stewart Schill (for "The Verdict")	Nominated
2016	68th Primetime Creative Arts Emmy Awards	Outstanding Sound Mixing for a Limited Series or Movie	Doug Andham, Joe Earle, and John Bauman (for "From the Ashes of Tragedy")	Won
2016	32nd TCA Awards			
2016	32nd TCA Awards	Program of the Year	The People v. O. J. Simpson: American Crime Story	Won
2016	32nd TCA Awards	Outstanding Achievement in Movies, Miniseries and Specials	The People v. O. J. Simpson: American Crime Story	Won
2016	32nd TCA Awards	Individual Achievement in Drama	Sarah Paulson	Won
2016	32nd TCA Awards	Individual Achievement in Drama	Courtney B. Vance	Nominated
2016	7th Critics' Choice Television Awards	Best Movie/ Miniseries	The People v. O. J. Simpson: American Crime Story	Won
2016	7th Critics' Choice Television Awards	Best Actor in a Movie/Miniseries	Courtney B. Vance	Won
2016	7th Critics' Choice Television Awards	Best Actor in a Movie/Miniseries	Cuba Gooding Jr.	Nominated
2016	7th Critics' Choice Television Awards	Best Actress in a Movie/ Miniseries	Sarah Paulson	Won
2016	7th Critics' Choice Television Awards	Best Supporting Actor in a Movie/ Miniseries	Sterling K. Brown	Won
2016	7th Critics' Choice Television Awards	Best Supporting Actor in a Movie/ Miniseries	John Travolta	Nominated
2017	74th Golden Globe Awards	Best Limited Series or Television Film	The People v. O. J. Simpson: American Crime Story	Won
2017	74th Golden Globe Awards	Best Actor – Limited Series or TV Film	Courtney B. Vance	Nominated
2017	74th Golden Globe Awards	Best Actress – Limited Series or TV Film	Sarah Paulson	Won
2017	74th Golden Globe Awards	Best Supporting Actor – Television	Sterling K. Brown	Nominated
2017	74th Golden Globe Awards	Best Supporting Actor – Television	John Travolta	Nominated
2017	21st Satellite Awards	Best Miniseries or Television Film	The People v. O. J. Simpson: American Crime Story	Won
2017	21st Satellite Awards	Best Actor - Miniseries or Television Film	Courtney B. Vance	Nominated
2017	21st Satellite Awards	Best Actor - Miniseries or Television Film	Cuba Gooding Jr.	Nominated
2017	21st Satellite Awards	Best Actress - Miniseries or Television Film	Sarah Paulson	Won
2017	Writers Guild of America Awards	Long Form – Adapted	Scott Alexander, Joe Robert Cole, D.V. DeVincentis, Maya Forbes, Larry Karaszewski, and Wally Wolodarsky	Won
2017	American Film Institute Awards 2016	Top 10 Television Programs	The People v. O. J. Simpson: American Crime Story	Won
2017	23rd Screen Actors Guild Awards	Outstanding Performance by a Male Actor in a Television Movie or Limited Series	Sterling K. Brown	Nominated
2017	23rd Screen Actors Guild Awards	Outstanding Performance by a Male Actor in a Television Movie or Limited Series	Courtney B. Vance	Nominated
2017	23rd Screen Actors Guild Awards	Outstanding Performance by a Female Actor in a Television Movie or Limited Series	Sarah Paulson	Won
2017	ACE Eddie Awards 2017	Best Edited Miniseries or Motion Picture for Television	Adam Penn, Stewart Schill and C. Chi-yoon Chung (for "Marcia, Marcia, Marcia")	Nominated
2017	21st Art Directors Guild Awards	Excellence in Production Design for a Television Movie or Limited Series	Jeffrey Mossa (for "100% Not Guilty"," ""Marcia, Marcia, Marcia"," ""Manna From Heaven")	Nominated
2017	Producers Guild of America Awards 2017	Outstanding Producer of Long-Form Television	Scott Alexander, Larry Karaszewski, Ryan Murphy, Brad Falchuk, Nina Jacobson, Brad Simpson, D.V. DeVincentis, Anthony Hemingway, Alexis Martin Woodall, John Travolta, Chip Vucelich	Won
2017	Cinema Audio Society Awards 2017	Outstanding Achievement in Sound Mixing for a Television Movie or Mini-Series	John Bauman, Joe Earle, Doug Andham, Judah Getz and John Guentner	Won
2017	Society of Camera Operators Awards	Camera Operator of the Year – Television	Andrew Mitchell	Won
2017	British Academy Television Awards	Best International Program	Ryan Murphy, Nina Jacobson, Brad Simpson	Won

== Home media ==
The People v. O. J. Simpson: American Crime Story was released on Blu-Ray and DVD on September 6, 2016, by 20th Century Fox Home Entertainment

== See also ==
- O.J.: Made in America-The 2016 Oscar-winning documentary that featured some of the participants portrayed in the miniseries
- June 17th, 1994-An episode of the acclaimed 30 for 30 series from ESPN that also covered the OJ Bronco chase
- American Tragedy-The 2000 TV movie that also covered the Simpson trial
- The O. J. Simpson Story
