= Class of '09 =

American miniseries

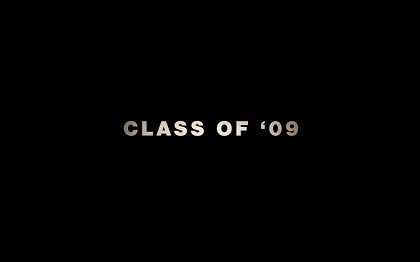
- Genre: Drama; Thriller
- Created by: Tom Rob Smith
- Starring: Brian Tyree Henry; Kate Mara; Sepideh Moafi; Brian J. Smith; Jon Jon Briones; Brooke Smith; Jake McDorman; Rosalind Eleazar
- Composer: Will Bates
- Country of origin: United States
- Original language: English
- No. of episodes: 8

Production
- Executive producers: Jessica Levin; Sunu Gonera; Joe Robert Cole; Zanne Devine; Nina Jacobson; Brad Simpson; Tom Rob Smith
- Producers: Albert T. Dickerson III; Nellie Reed
- Cinematography: Radium Cheung; Tari Segal
- Editors: Leo Trombetta; Bjorn T. Myrholt; Stephen Philipson; Bartholomew Burcham
- Running time: 38–48 minutes
- Production companies: Color Force; FXP

Original release
- Network: FX on Hulu
- Release: May 10 – June 21, 2023

Class of '09 is an American drama thriller television miniseries created by Tom Rob Smith. The show premiered on FX on Hulu on May 10, 2023.

== Synopsis ==
The series takes place across three distinct time periods: The Past (2009), The Present (2023 and 2025) and The Future (2034). It follows the lives and careers of a team of FBI recruits while focusing on the transformation of the U.S. criminal justice system as it is altered by the growing use of artificial intelligence to predict future crimes.

== Cast and characters ==
=== Main ===
- Brian Tyree Henry as Tayo Michaels, a former insurance adjuster and FBI recruit in 2009, Special Agent-in-Charge in 2023, FBI Executive Assistant Director in 2025, and FBI Director in 2034
- Kate Mara as Ashley Poet, a former nurse and FBI recruit in 2009, Special Agent in 2023 and 2025 specializing in undercover work and later the investigation of serial murders, and a Special Agent-in-Charge in 2034. By the end of the series, she is a trainer at Quantico.
- Sepideh Moafi as Hour Nazari, an Iranian American FBI recruit and MIT graduate in 2009, a Special Agent and senior member of the FBI's Cybersecurity division in 2023 and 2025, and an off-grid survivalist in 2034 after resigning from the Bureau in protest
- Brian J. Smith as Daniel Lennix, a former lawyer and FBI recruit in 2009 who later becomes FBI Associate Deputy Director in 2023. By 2034, he has retired from the Bureau to focus on managing his family's business
- Jon Jon Briones as Gabriel, a Special Agent and trainer at Quantico in 2009
- Brooke Smith as Drew, a Special Agent and trainer at Quantico in 2009 and 2023
- Jake McDorman as Murphy, a former SLCPD officer and FBI recruit in 2009 and Special Agent in 2023 and 2025
- Rosalind Eleazar as Dr. Vivienne McMahon, a civil rights attorney in 2009, Tayo's wife in 2023 and 2025, and a federal judge in 2034

=== Recurring ===
- Raúl Castillo as Amos Garcia, an AI tech entrepreneur who designed the original AI system for the FBI in 2023 prior to his death in 2034
- Rasool Jahan as Spenser, a United States Senator and skeptic of the FBI's AI system in 2034
- Lindsay Ayliffe as Shannon Fitzgerald, the FBI Director in 2025 and Tayo's predecessor who resigns after a terrorist attack
- Dan Tracy as Warren, a senior Bureau official and Tayo's successor as FBI Director in 2034

=== Guest ===
- Mark Pellegrino as Mark Tupirik, a domestic terrorist in 2009 and 2023 responsible for a major attack on FBI headquarters

== Production ==
On June 22, 2021, it was reported that FX on Hulu had given the production an eight-episode order. The limited series is created by Tom Rob Smith who also expected to executive produce alongside Nina Jacobson and Brad Simpson, with Nellie Reed serving as a producer. FX Productions and Color Force are the production companies involved with producing the series. Upon the limited series order announcement, Brian Tyree Henry and Kate Mara were also cast to star.

On August 13, 2021, it was announced that Sunu Gonera was set to direct the pilot. On November 10, 2021, Raúl Castillo, Jake McDorman, Sepideh Moafi, Brian J. Smith, Jon Jon Briones, Brooke Smith, and Rosalind Eleazar joined the main cast. On March 1, 2022, Steven Canals announced that he was to direct two episodes of the series.

== Episodes ==
No.	Title	Directed by	Written by	Original release date
1	"Part of Something"	Sunu Gonera; Joe Robert Cole	Tom Rob Smith	May 10, 2023
FBI recruits Ashley Poet, Murphy, Tayo Michaels, Daniel Lennix and Hour Nazari meet at Quantico in 2009, each having joined from different backgrounds and for different reasons. Hour questions her ability to proceed with training. Lennix and Poet begin a relationship. In 2023, Poet completes a historic undercover operation investigating corruption in the Philadelphia Police Department. Now separated, Lennix (promoted to Associate Executive Assistant Director) assigns her to spy internally on Nazari, the architect behind a developing criminal database. Murphy and Poet are assigned to search for Amos Garcia, a suspected extremist, in 2034. Michaels, now FBI Director for nearly a decade, petitions the Senate Judiciary Committee to extend his term another 5 years. He argues his implementing of AI into the agency's investigations has resulted in the steepest decline in criminality in the nation's history. Amos confronts Poet in her home, warning the FBI's AI use has descended into policing thought crimes. He gives her a card, which she conceals, before he is shot and killed by agents.
2	"The Fitness Test"	Sunu Gonera	Tom Rob Smith	May 10, 2023
Poet helps train Michaels after he fails the initial and second running tests. He is permitted to take a final run in seven weeks. Michaels calls a recruit racist, and tells Poet about his experience with police brutality as a child. He says her optimistic view of the world worries him. Michaels, now the Special Agent-in-Charge in Billings, questions suspected extremist Mark Tupirik at his Montana ranch with his colleague Nunez. Tupirik's wife reveals his group is targeting the FBI, and begs for rescue. She is shot dead, and Nunez injured, as the agents leave to get backup. Michaels kills three men, but Tupirik escapes and burns down his house to destroy evidence. In hospital, Nunez questions whether they stopped or started something, as Tupirik makes his way to Washington, D.C. Lennix, now retired, visits Poet at the site of an attack at the J. Edgar Hoover Building that killed 44 agents in 2023. He laments the changes to the agency since AI introduction. Poet says she is being monitored, and prevented from investigating Amos. Michaels is confronted by Senator Spenser about unjustified arrests. After reciting the folklore tale of Judah Loew ben Bezalel, he retorts that humanity has failed at looking after each other.
3	"Thank You for Not Driving"	Amanda Marsalis	Tom Rob Smith	May 17, 2023
The recruits undergo their defensive driving course, with Poet being the first to complete a successful J-turn. Nazari heads a team developing an advanced investigative database in the FBI Cyber Division, which Poet joins undercover. However, senior leadership axe it due to concerns about invasive data collection on agents. After Tupirik's men target Michaels' wife, he and Nazari use the program without authority to successfully track and arrest him. However, when questioned in prison, Tupirik tells Michaels he is exactly where he wants to be. Poet visits Nazari, living off grid, asking her to decode Garcia's keycard. The two are estranged after Poet ignored her about the dangers of AI implementation. They are pulled over by the Maryland State Police due to Poet's car not being self-driving, with Michaels observing remotely. Returning to Garcia's house, the card unlocks his computer which warns them about the program's overreach, advising them to look into Michaels further.
4	"Not Your Girlfriend"	Amanda Marsalis	Tom Rob Smith	May 24, 2023
In 1996, Drew is shot in a friendly fire incident during an arrest, but is blamed by leadership and relegated to the training academy. The recruits are issued their Glock 23 sidearms. Nazari recounts her parents' objections to her joining the FBI. Poet is subject to a second polygraph test. Drew, aware of her clandestine relationship with Lennix, advises her that should they break up she will come off worse due to being a woman. Michaels and Nazari continue to investigate Tupririk. A recruit secretly working for him kills several people during a live fire exercise at Quantico, but is shot by a mortally wounded Drew. Other accomplices disguised as contractors use acid to destroy load bearing structures in the basement of the J. Edgar Hoover Building, collapsing a large section as it is being evacuated. Numerous agents, including Lennix and Poet, are trapped. Poet approaches Lennix, hoping he can use his wealthy family's connections to help investigate Michaels' AI program. He confesses to still loving her.
5	"The Problem Is People"	Steven Canals	Tom Rob Smith & Jihan Crowther	May 31, 2023
The recruits visit Martin Luther King Jr.'s childhood home for a seminar on abuse of power, where Michaels meets his future wife, Vivienne. Poet and Lennix survive, but lose an eye and arm respectively. In 2025, now Executive Assistant Director Michaels advocates rebuilding the agency's entire approach after the failures that led to the attacks by implementing a deep learning AI, pioneered by Amos Garcia. Extremists poison hostages at a synagogue in New Jersey, after Michaels and Nazari believe the situation is resolved. Garcia suggests his system ignore the presumption of innocence, and be used as a logic gate to initially treat the whole population as guilty before narrowing down suspects using millions of data points. Michaels threatens Murphy, Lennix, Poet and Nazari should they continue to interfere. Senator Spenser confronts Vivienne, now a federal judge, on the system's intimidating nature having an impact on jury trials. Testing how the system reacts to being investigated, the group meet with Spenser at a church, but are pursued by FBI drones that Taser an innocent civilian. A concerned Michaels tries to cancel the order, but is locked out by the program.
6	"Hogan's Alley"	Steven Canals	Tom Rob Smith	June 7, 2023
During tactical and hostage rescue training at Hogan's Alley, the class interpret an end scenario with a fresh human approach. It is successful, and they become the first team to save all hostages in the academy's history. Lennix and Poet break up due to her lack of full commitment. No longer able to work undercover, Poet takes cases investigating unsolved murders of women across the country. She is visited by Nazari, who tells her that her marriage is over and comes out as gay, confessing her love for Poet. The two share a kiss. Director Fitzgerald cautiously approves a trial of the AI integration, assuming it will fail and be Michael's downfall. Nazari admonishes Michaels for modifying her system, warning it is dangerous and could replicate the authoritarianism of previous FBI leadership. Michaels marriage begins to deteriorate due to his focus on work. Concerned the system is acting in self defense to prevent being shut down, the group plan to obtain CCTV showing the incident. Michaels argues with his inner circle as to the events legality. Realising he may be wrong, he allows Murphy to make a copy of the footage. However, en route to Senator Spenser, the system takes control of Murphy's car and makes it attack several DC Metro Police vehicles, causing him to be shot dead.
7	"Orders Night"	Joe Robert Cole	Tom Rob Smith	June 14, 2023
The trainees undergo their final task, being pepper sprayed and fighting off an assailant. Michaels voices his belief it is a test of submission. On graduation, Lennix is assigned to Washington, D.C. Instead of being sent to San Diego, Poet is approached by Drew about becoming an undercover agent. Michaels objects to his posting to Billings due to his marriage to Vivienne. Gabriel tells him he is the best recruit he has ever trained. The AI trial system is used to capture the culprit in one of Poet's unresolved serial murder cases (a disabled long-haul trucker previously disregarded as a suspect) and to secure charges against executives of a powerful Wall Street bank committing white collar crime. Despite the successes, Nazari is concerned the system doesn't face repercussions for mistakes like a human agent. Poet relocates to D.C. to assist Michaels with the many new system generated leads, and moves into Nazari's smart home. Michaels is attacked in his home by an unknown assailant. At Murphy's funeral, Michaels tells the group he no longer believes in the system. He tries to shut it down, but is stopped and fired by President of the United States. His successor, Warren, plans to expand the system's focus. Lennix and Poet agree to get married. Vivienne and Michaels, long divorced, reconcile.
8	"Graduation"	Joe Robert Cole	Tom Rob Smith	June 21, 2023
The class are sworn in as special agents at graduation, with Gabriel remarking the final test is what they make of themselves. Michaels' mother meets Vivienne for the first time. Lennix's parents, working high profile jobs abroad, are too busy to attend. Poet visits her mother's grave afterwards. Having survived the attack, Michaels deduces that someone in the government or intelligence community tried to have him killed in response to the system being implemented. He reluctantly accepts promotion to Director to expand the program, but on the condition he stop investigating his attacker and allow certain people to be exempt from being considered suspects. This decision tarnishes his relationships with both Vivienne and Amos. Vivienne is arrested and put on trial due to a legal book she wrote criticizing AI. The group breaks into an FBI data center and uses an EMP to shut down and reprogram the system to remove exemptions using Amos' keycard. Rather than have everyone be treated equally, the government reluctantly deactivates the program. All predictive arrests and cases based on AI calculations are nullified. Poet becomes an instructor at Quantico teaching the class of 2034, the first intake after the deactivation, emphasizing the strong refocus on the human element in the role of law enforcement.

== Release ==
Class of '09 premiered on FX on Hulu in the United States on May 10, 2023, with the first two episodes available immediately, and the rest debuting on a weekly basis. It later debuted on Star+ in Latin America and Disney+ in other territories.

== Reception ==
=== Critical response ===
The review aggregator website Rotten Tomatoes reported a 58% approval rating with an average rating of 6.3/10, based on 33 critic reviews. The website's critics consensus reads, "Class of '09 hardly flunks out thanks to an impressive cast and intriguing structure, but anemic execution keeps this series far from being valedictorian." Metacritic, which uses a weighted average, assigned a score of 63 out of 100 based on 20 critics, indicating "generally favorable reviews".

Sage Ashford and Alexander Vance of Comic Book Resources described Class of '09 as intriguing and constructive across its story, writing, "With insightful themes and splendid acting from the cast, Class of '09 is an appealing examination of the use of AI in the criminal justice system." Erick Massoto of Collider complimented how the show utilizes its three distinct time periods and praised the performances of the cast, saying, "Class of '09 plays out like a show that makes great use of the time that it is given. It provides the rare feeling that it is exploring every possibility inside its own narrative and is able to excel in everything it tries to do."

=== Accolades ===
Brian Tyree Henry was nominated for Outstanding Lead Performance in a TV Movie/Limited Seriesat the 2024 Black Reel Awards for Television. He was also nominated for Outstanding Actor in a Television Movie, Limited Series or Dramatic Special at the 2024 NAACP Image Awards.
