= Clipped (miniseries) =

Sports drama miniseries

- Genre: Sports drama
- Created by: Gina Welch
- Based on: The Sterling Affairs by Ramona Shelburne
- Starring: Laurence Fishburne; Ed O'Neill; Jacki Weaver; Cleopatra Coleman; Kelly AuCoin
- Country of origin: United States
- Original language: English
- No. of episodes: 6

Production
- Executive producers: Gina Welch; Nina Jacobson; Brad Simpson; Zanne Devine; Ramona Shelburne; Kevin Bray
- Production companies: Color Force; Indistinct Chatter; FXP

Original release
- Network: FX on Hulu
- Release: June 4 – July 2, 2024

Clipped is an American sports drama television miniseries, created by Gina Welch and based on the ESPN 30 for 30 podcast The Sterling Affairs. The series premiered on June 4, 2024, on FX on Hulu. It focuses on the downfall of Los Angeles Clippers owner Donald Sterling, amid the team's drive to win a championship under coach Doc Rivers. The miniseries received generally positive reviews from critics.

== Cast ==
=== Main ===
- Laurence Fishburne as Doc Rivers
- Ed O'Neill as Donald Sterling
- Jacki Weaver as Shelly Sterling
- Cleopatra Coleman as V. Stiviano
- Kelly AuCoin as Andy Roeser

=== Recurring ===
- J. Alphonse Nicholson as Chris Paul
- Rich Sommer as Seth Burton
- Corbin Bernsen as Pierce O'Donnell
- Clifton Davis as Elgin Baylor
- Harriet Sansom Harris as Justine
- Petri Hawkins-Byrd as Alvin Gentry
- LeVar Burton as himself
- Jock McKissic as Glen "Big Baby" Davis
- Sheldon Bailey as DeAndre Jordan
- Austin Scott as Blake Griffin
- Charlie McElveen as JJ Redick
- Sarunas J. Jackson as Matt Barnes
- Darryl Wesley as Jamal Crawford

== Production ==
In April 2022, FX gave permission to go ahead with a six-episode limited series titled The Sterling Affairs, with Laurence Fishburne and Jacki Weaver being respectively cast as Doc Rivers and Shelly Sterling. In January 2023, Harriet Samson Harris, Corbin Bernsen, Yvonna Pearson, Jock McKissic, Darryl Wesley, Rich Sommer, and Clifton Davis joined the cast. The miniseries is executive produced by showrunner and creator Gina Welch, alongside Nina Jacobson, Brad Simpson, Zanne Devine, Ramona Shelburne, and director Kevin Bray.

== Episodes ==
No.	Title	Directed by	Written by	Original release date
1	"White Party"	Kevin Bray	Gina Welch	June 4, 2024
2	"A Blessing and a Curse"	Kevin Bray	Gina Welch	June 4, 2024
3	"Let the Games Began"	Francesca Gregorini	Tracey Scott Wilson	June 11, 2024
4	"Winning Ugly"	Kevin Bray	Tearrance Arvelle Chisholm	June 18, 2024
5	"The Best Words"	Francesca Gregorini	Gina Welch	June 25, 2024
6	"Keep Smiling"	Michael Blieden	Rembert Browne & Gina Welch	July 2, 2024

== Release ==
The trailer of Clipped was released by Hulu on April 25, 2024. The miniseries premiered on Hulu on June 4, 2024. The first two episodes were released, while the remaining four episodes were released on a weekly basis. Internationally, the miniseries was made available to stream on Disney+.

== Reception ==
=== Viewership ===
Whip Media, which tracks viewership data for the more than 25 million worldwide users of its TV Time app, reported that Clipped was the fourth most-anticipated new series for June 2024. Clipped ranked No. 14 on Hulu's "Top 15 Today" list—a daily updated list of the platform's most-watched titles—on July 2. According to market research company Parrot Analytics, which analyzes consumer engagement through streaming, downloads, and social media activity, Clipped experienced a notable increase in audience demand in the United States during December 2024. The show reached a demand level 8.0 times higher than the average TV series over the past 30 days, placing it among the top 8.6% of shows in the market. Ranking in the 96.7th percentile within the biography genre, Clipped also experienced high demand in international markets such as Israel, Canada, and several European countries.

=== Critical response ===
The review aggregator website Rotten Tomatoes reported an 88% approval rating with an average rating of 7.30/10, based on 33 critic reviews. The website's critics consensus reads, "Sordid and soapy as befitting the story of Donald Sterling's fall from grace, Clipped's terrific ensemble brings this memorable cast of real-life characters to vivid life." Metacritic, which uses a weighted average, assigned a score of 72 out of 100 based on 21 critics, indicating "generally favorable reviews".

Alison Herman of Variety draws a comparison to HBO's Winning Time, noting that while both shows explore the world of Los Angeles basketball, Clipped takes a more focused and contained approach. They praised the series for its quick pace and its ability to capture the chaotic, scandalous atmosphere surrounding the incident. Herman also highlighted O'Neill's performance as Sterling, describing it as both loathsome and darkly humorous, and complimented the portrayal of Doc Rivers and the Clippers players as sympathetic figures caught in a moral and professional dilemma. However, Herman pointed out that the show is less successful when it tries to expand beyond the immediate scandal to address broader social issues, sometimes feeling forced or overly didactic. Shawn Laib of Den of Geek gave Clipped a score of four out of five stars, praised O'Neill's portrayal of Sterling, describing his performance as Emmy-worthy, saying the actor captures Sterling's unsettling quirks and inappropriate behavior, making his portrayal both disturbing and ironically humorous. Laib said Coleman brings depth to V. Stiviano who, in real life, remained an enigmatic figure. Despite complimenting the artistic expression in the series, recognizing its understanding of the intricate details of the events, Laib questioned the timing of the show, suggesting that the story might be too recent to fully engage viewers, as the events are still fresh in the public's memory.

Margaret Lyons of The New York Times acknowledged Clipped as an effective retelling of the Sterling scandal, strengthened by strong performances from Fishburne, Coleman, O'Neill, and Weaver. However, Lyons said the series' lack of nuance and originality, pointing out that while it covers the fundamentals well, it often leans on repetition and avoids subtlety. They compared Clipped to other sports docudramas and podcast-to-TV adaptations, but suggested it does not offer any fresh insights or provoke a cultural reassessment, instead simply reaffirming what was already known. Even though it does not get further into its issues, Lyons complimented the miniseries for its clarity and pace despite its shortcomings. Robert Lloyd of Los Angeles Times praised Coleman's nuanced performance as V. Stiviano, saying she balances ambition and vulnerability, making her the standout. Neill and Fishburne are also noted for their strong performances, with Fishburne's portrayal of Doc Rivers adding a more grounded, sympathetic element to the series. Despite its clever writing and notable performances, Lloyd found Clipped more diverting than compelling, questioning whether the story's characters are worth truly caring about.

=== Accolades ===
Laurence Fishburne was nominated for Outstanding Actor in a Limited Television (Series, Special, or Movie) at the 56th NAACP Image Awards.

It was also nominated for a Peabody Award.
