= The Killing of Two Lovers =

- Official poster
- Directed by: Robert Machoian
- Written by: Robert Machoian
- Produced by: Robert Machoian; Clayne Crawford; Scott Christopherson
- Starring: Clayne Crawford; Sepideh Moafi; Chris Coy; Avery Pizzuto; Arri Graham; Ezra Graham
- Cinematography: Oscar Ignacio Jimenez
- Edited by: Robert Machoian
- Production companies: Back40 Pictures; 433 Pictures; Soro Films
- Distributed by: Neon
- Release dates: January 27, 2020 (Sundance); May 14, 2021 (United States)
- Running time: 84 minutes
- Country: United States
- Language: English
- Box office: $113,649

The Killing of Two Lovers is a 2020 American drama film written, directed, produced, and edited by Robert Machoian. It stars Clayne Crawford, Sepideh Moafi, Chris Coy, Avery Pizzuto, Arri Graham and Ezra Graham.

It had its world premiere at the Sundance Film Festival on January 27, 2020. It was released on May 14, 2021, by Neon.

== Plot ==
In a rural Utah town, David, a father of four, grapples with his separation from wife Nikki. Nikki has started a relationship with her co-worker Derek, sparking intense emotions in David. One morning, David finds the two sleeping in their bed and contemplates killing them both with his gun but ultimately refrains, seeking solace at his father's home. He then drives off to follow Derek in his truck with the intention to kill him, but a message from Nikki alters his course.

The relationship between David and Nikki appears amicable, with discussions about their eldest daughter Jess's negative reaction to the separation. Unaware of her father's knowledge, Jess discloses her mother's "cheating," leading to tense explanations about their agreement to see other people. Despite David's emotional turmoil, he and Nikki attempt a date, but it's cut short due to her concerns about Jess's well-being. The couple discusses their post-separation future, exposing David's washed-up rock artist status and Nikki's contemplation of a law career. The evening takes a turn when Derek arrives for a date, triggering an outburst from Jess.

Returning home, David's emotional turmoil escalates as he lashes out at a Body Opponent Bag. In the early morning, he struggles to bond with his sons, Alex, Theo, and Bug, over the comedy of Mitch Hedberg, revealing the strain on the family. A heated argument with Nikki ensues after she confronts David about his visit, where she accuses him of confusing their kids about their future as a family. He then drives off with his B.O.B. and takes it to an open field where he uses it for target practice with his gun.

Seeking a bonding experience, he buys model rockets for a weekend outing with his children. The day turns sour when Jess's rocket fails to launch, and in her frustration, she explodes on him over his unwillingness to mend his marriage. David consoles her before taking his children back home. There, Nikki reveals to David that she refused to allow Jess to go to a concert with her friends so that she could spend time with him, but David explains his fears that Jess will begin blaming him for not getting to live her life. Their argument is overheard by Derek, who has come to spend the weekend with Nikki. David becomes angered when Derek refers to Nikki as his girlfriend and becomes increasingly confrontational with him. As Nikki leaves them alone to check on her children, Derek brutally beats David and tells him he doesn't deserve her before going inside. Nikki attempts to intervene, but David, bruised and bloodied, drives off in distress. In a delirious state, David believes he sees Derek approaching and fires his gun, unaware that it's Nikki. The aftermath leaves Nikki cradling David, both expressing their love for each other. Sometime later, the family, including Jess, happily shops for appliances before leaving together in David's truck.

== Cast ==
- Clayne Crawford as David
- Sepideh Moafi as Nikki
- Chris Coy as Derek
- Avery Pizzuto as Jess
- Arri Graham as Alex
- Ezra Graham as Theo

== Release ==
The film had its world premiere at the Sundance Film Festival on January 27, 2020. In October 2020, Neon acquired distribution rights to the film, and set it for a May 14, 2021, release.

== Critical reception ==
The film received critical acclaim. It has a 93% approval rating on review aggregator website Rotten Tomatoes, based on 98 reviews, with an average of 8/10. The site's critical consensus reads, "The Killing of Two Lovers unites deft direction and an artfully assembled cast in service of a powerful story." According to Metacritic, which sampled 23 critics and calculated a weighted average score of 82 out of 100, indicating "universal acclaim".
