= Notorious (2016 TV series) =

American crime and legal drama television series

- Genre: Crime drama; Legal drama
- Created by: Josh Berman; Allie Hagan
- Starring: Piper Perabo; Daniel Sunjata; Sepideh Moafi
- Composer: Fil Eisler
- Country of origin: United States
- Original language: English
- No. of seasons: 1
- No. of episodes: 10

Production
- Executive producers: Michael Engler; Kenny Meiselas; Brian Gersh; Jeff Kwatinetz; Josh Barry
- Running time: 43 minutes
- Production companies: Osprey Productions; ABC Studios; Sony Pictures Television

Original release
- Network: ABC
- Release: September 22 – December 8, 2016

Notorious is an American crime and legal drama television series broadcast on ABC. The series, starring Piper Perabo and Daniel Sunjata, was announced on May 12, 2016. The series premiered on Thursday, September 22, 2016. On October 25, 2016, the number of episodes was reduced by ABC from thirteen to ten; however, the series remained on the network's schedule until December 8, 2016, when the final episode of the first season was broadcast. The series was officially cancelled in May 2017.

== Plot ==
The show is based on real-life criminal defense attorney Mark Geragos and Larry King Live news producer Wendy Walker.

== Main cast ==
- Piper Perabo as Julia George
- Daniel Sunjata as Jake Gregorian
- Sepideh Moafi as Megan Byrd
- Kate Jennings Grant as Louise Herrick
- Ryan Guzman as Ryan Mills
- Kevin Zegers as Oscar Keaton
- J. August Richards as Bradley Gregorian
- Aimee Teegarden as Ella Benjamin

== Episodes ==
No.	Title	Directed by	Written by	Original release date	US viewers (millions)
1	"Pilot"	Michael Engler	Josh Berman & Allie Hagan	September 22, 2016	5.39
The show takes us through the life of Julia George, a media mogul and producer of the number one cable news show Louise Herrick Live (also known as LHL). When Oscar Keaton, the client of lawyer Jake Gregorian, is arrested in a hit and run, he runs around in circles until the evidence turns to Oscar's wife Sara, who previously had an affair with Jake. When Sara ends up murdered, they don't know where to turn. Elsewhere, Julia finds out that her boyfriend who was just promoted to the federal bench hires escorts.
2	"The Perp Walk"	Michael Engler	Josh Berman	September 29, 2016	4.51
As he prepares to defend Oscar Keaton from accusations that he killed his wife, Jake and Julia clash over a distraught woman's claim that her son was kidnapped. He convinces her to go on LHL and let the world know, which will speed up the hunt for the missing child. She reluctantly does so, but a man she recently dated calls the show and says the woman has no children. Julia gets involved, and also learns that the woman's ex-husband is in prison and is up for parole. The case of Sara Keaton's murder continues, with Jake finally admitting to Julia and Bradley that he slept with Sara the night before she was murdered. Julia learns that her intern Ryan was the one who sent the photo of Sara's dead body, as he had followed Oscar home that night. Oscar has returned to drinking after years of being sober, and goes off on a bender. Although Jake still believes Oscar is innocent, he concocts a story to get the police to arrest him, mainly to save Oscar from himself.
3	"Friends and Other Strangers"	Mike Listo	Jennifer Cecil	October 6, 2016	4.20
Famous rock star/humanitarian Trinity is attacked and falls into a coma. A video soon surfaces of a drugged woman being raped by Trinity, but Julia is asked by her boss to not run the tape because the LHL parent company also owns Trinity's record company. Julia also crosses Louise by forcing her to recap an incident on-air that Louise had previously said was strictly off limits. Sara Keaton's murder case heats up when it is discovered that Oscar's business partner Levi "catfished" him by pretending to be an actress who was sexting Oscar. The LHL team soon realizes Levi stands the most to gain if Oscar is imprisoned.
4	"Tell Me a Secret"	Michael Engler	Terrence Coli	October 13, 2016	3.90
A loner named Dax Edwards (Zak Henri) is accused on social media of murdering a college freshman football player who was Dax's high school classmate. Dax's sister Chloe (Monica Barbaro) asks Jake for help, indicating she and Dax are the children of Jake's former classmate. Julia agrees to put Chloe on the show, but she crosses Jake by also scheduling the college football coach to appear. Further investigation reveals the football player may have been the victim of hazing, but the autopsy reveals the victim was likely still alive after the hazing was done. Meanwhile, Levi tries vehemently to deny his involvement in Sara Keaton's death, ultimately asking Julia for a private meeting in his home. At the meeting, Levi says Sara was toxic for Oscar, and the conversation leads Julia to ask if Levi had romantic feelings for his business partner. Levi then puts a loaded gun in his mouth and pulls the trigger.
5	"Missing"	Larry Shaw	Ben Koppel & Kevin Rodriguez	October 20, 2016	3.89
Jake, a one-time foster child, tackles a case that hits close to home. A young woman named Jenna (Sofia Vassilieva) is nearly nine months pregnant with a surrogate child for parents she has never met. The parents have stopped contact and payments, and Jenna fears the child will have to go into the foster system. Jenna has only met the broker (Brenda Strong), who refuses to reveal the parents' names, citing attorney-client privilege. In the Sara Keaton case, Julia is still in shock over witnessing Levi's suicide, but tells the District Attorney she doesn't think Levi killed Sara. Julia puts the DA on LHL, and angers him when she plays an old video of Levi saying Sara is bad for Oscar and he needs to get her out of his life. Meanwhile, a photo of Jake sleeping with Sara finds its way to Oscar in jail, causing Oscar to angrily fire Jake as his attorney.
6	"Kept and Broken"	Anton Cropper	Tom Mularz	October 27, 2016	3.75
Jake's affair with Sarah is revealed on live TV, but he also learns a disturbing secret about her as he's surprised by fresh allegations. Meanwhile, the disappearance of a girl from a wealthy background gets wall-to-wall coverage by the media, so Julia turns her attention to a victim the public barely knows.
7	"Chase"	Chad Lowe	Sharon Lee Watson	November 3, 2016	3.60
After Jake's dramatic arrest on LHL for Sarah's murder, he seeks refuge from the paparazzi at Julia's home while Bradley and Ella work to clear his name. Later, Jake discovers a terrible truth and goes to great lengths to find the person he suspects is the real killer.
8	"The Burn Book"	Kevin Rodney Sullivan	Zachary Reiter	November 10, 2016	3.77
Disgraced former TV news host Dana Hartman turns to Julia and Jake for help when her rebellious daughter becomes a suspect in the murder of her aspiring filmmaker boyfriend. Singer and reality-star Ray J get caught up in the case when he announces the murder weapon belonged to him.
9	"Choice"	J. Miller Tobin	Tyler Bensinger	November 17, 2016	4.12
The murder case against Maya Hartman has Jake working all kinds of angles, including wanting her mother to plead her case on "LHL," even though Louise once aired an illicit video of Dana with her daughter's boyfriend. Meanwhile, Louise and Julia plan a trip to Mexico to interview a ruthless drug kingpin, much to Max's dismay.
10	"Taken"	James Whitmore	Allie Hagan	December 8, 2016	2.58
When Julia is mistakenly taken hostage by Mexican cartel leader Carlos Mora, Jake and "LHL" take extreme measures to make sure she comes home safely. Mora says he will release her and a fellow journalist if she produces an interview that advances his propaganda.

== Reception ==
=== Critical response ===
Notorious received generally negative reviews from television critics. Rotten Tomatoes gave the show a 25% "rotten" rating with the site's critical consensus read, "Implausible and populated with unlikeable characters, Notorious forsakes dramatic credibility in favor of flash and fluff." By comparison, Metacritic gave the show a score of 32 out of 100, indicating "generally unfavorable reviews".

=== Ratings ===
Viewership and ratings per episode of Notorious
No.	Title	Air date	Rating/share (18–49)	Viewers (millions)	DVR (18–49)	DVR viewers (millions)	Total (18–49)	Total viewers (millions)
1	"Pilot"	September 22, 2016	1.1/4	5.39	0.7	2.74	1.8	8.13
2	"The Perp Walk"	September 29, 2016	1.1/4	4.51	—N/a	2.29	—N/a	6.80
3	"Friends and Other Strangers"	October 6, 2016	0.9/3	4.20	0.7	2.33	1.6	6.54
4	"Tell Me a Secret"	October 13, 2016	0.8/3	3.90	0.7	2.23	1.5	6.13
5	"Missing"	October 20, 2016	0.9/3	3.89	—N/a	—N/a	—N/a	—N/a
6	"Kept and Broken"	October 27, 2016	0.8/3	3.75	0.6	2.00	1.4	5.75
7	"Chase"	November 3, 2016	0.8/3	3.60	—N/a	1.91	—N/a	5.51
8	"The Burn Book"	November 10, 2016	0.9/3	3.77	—N/a	—N/a	—N/a	—N/a
9	"Choice"	November 17, 2016	0.9/3	4.12	—N/a	—N/a	—N/a	—N/a
10	"Taken"	December 8, 2016	0.5/2	2.58	0.5	1.91	1.0	4.49
