= All Day and a Night =

- Official poster
- Directed by: Joe Robert Cole
- Written by: Joe Robert Cole
- Produced by: Nina Jacobson; Brad Simpson; Jared Ian Goldman
- Starring: Ashton Sanders; Jeffrey Wright; Regina Taylor; Yahya Abdul-Mateen II
- Cinematography: Jessica Lee Gagné
- Edited by: Mako Kamitsuna
- Music by: Michael Abels
- Production companies: Color Force; Mighty Engine
- Distributed by: Netflix
- Release date: May 1, 2020 (United States)
- Running time: 121 minutes
- Country: United States
- Language: English

All Day and a Night is a 2020 American crime drama film written and directed by Joe Robert Cole. It stars Jeffrey Wright, Ashton Sanders, and Yahya Abdul-Mateen II.

It premiered on Netflix on May 1, 2020.

== Plot ==
An aspiring rapper named Jahkor Lincoln arrives in prison. He ends up serving a life sentence for murder and looks back on the days preceding his arrest and the circumstances of his childhood to find clues to his way forward in life and his survival.

During his childhood, he suffered abuse from his father JD, who was a drug addict and a criminal. His mother Delonda did her best to keep things together. Jahkor ends up turning to petty thefts and assaults with his friend TQ. Jahkor also ended up offering his services to a gangster named Big Stunna, while also having a relationship with a woman named Shantaye with whom he ends up having a son named Zion. Although he tried to lead an honest lifestyle for his son, Jahkor always ended up in trouble.

Jahkor offered to kill Stunna's rival, Malcolm, and he did so by executing Malcolm and his girlfriend Cece in front of their daughter Miesha in their home. It was revealed that as a child, Jahkor saw Malcolm selling his father JD drugs. He asked Malcolm to stop and was rebuffed. He blamed Malcolm for JD's ongoing drug use and the damage to his family. After his arrest, Jahkor learns that TQ and a former associate, T-Rex, were working for Malcolm. Stunna and his girlfriend murder T-Rex while Jahkor kills TQ when he ends up in prison.

Jahkor meets his son when Shantaye brings him along with her and also assures that his son will not end up like him or JD. Jahkor and JD also work on their relationship behind bars.

== Cast ==
- Ashton Sanders as Jahkor Abraham Lincoln
  - Jalyn Emil Hall as young Jahkor
- Jeffrey Wright as James Daniel Lincoln "JD"
- Regina Taylor as Tommetta
- Yahya Abdul-Mateen II as Big Stunna
- Christopher Meyer as Lamark
- Andrea Lynn Ellsworth as Kim
- Baily Hopkins as Ms. Ferguson
- Gretchen Klein as Debbie
- Andray Johnson as Mr. Hudson
- Stephen Barrington as Malcolm
- Rolanda D. Bell as La-Trice
- Isaiah John as TQ
- Kelly Jenrette as Delanda
- Shakira Ja'nai Paye as Shantaye

== Production ==
On March 20, 2018, it was announced that Netflix had greenlit a new film entitled All Day and a Night written and directed by Joe Robert Cole. In July 2018, Ashton Sanders, Jeffrey Wright, Yahya Abdul-Mateen II, and Regina Taylor joined the cast of the film. In August 2018, Jalyn Hall and Christopher Meyer joined the cast of the film.

Principal photography began on July 30, 2018.

== Release ==
It was released on May 1, 2020.

== Reception ==
All Day and a Night holds a 54% approval rating on review aggregator website Rotten Tomatoes, based on 37 reviews, with an average of 5.9/10. The website's critical consensus reads, "All Day and a Night addresses worthy issues with thoughtfulness and care, although its effectiveness is undermined by a disappointingly familiar story." On Metacritic, the film has a weighted average score of 60 out of 100 based on 15 critics, indicating "mixed or average" reviews.

== See also ==
- List of hood films
