= Joe Robert Cole =

American filmmaker and actor

- Born: January 1, 1980 (age 46); San Francisco, California, U.S.
- Education: University of California, Berkeley
- Occupations: Film director; screenwriter; film editor; television writer; television producer; actor
- Years active: 2011–present
- Known for: The People v. O. J. Simpson: American Crime Story; Black Panther

Joe Robert Cole (born January 1, 1980) is an American filmmaker and actor. He is best known for his Emmy Award-nominated and Writers Guild of America Award-winning work on the first season of the true crime anthology television series American Crime Story, titled The People v. O. J. Simpson, and for co-writing the film Black Panther and its sequel, Wakanda Forever.

== Early life ==
Cole, an only child, moved around a lot growing up, which he felt "prepared" him to be a writer, a desire he only discovered during college. He soon applied to the University of California, Berkeley.

== Career ==
During his tenure at the university, Cole entered the film business, working as a writer on the 2006 film ATL, although not receiving a credit. In 2011, he released his first feature film as a director and writer, Amber Lake.

=== Marvel Studios' program ===
After writing a "Chinatown-style cop script", Cole was invited to a meeting with Marvel Studios, where he was told that they had plans of doing a movie about the character War Machine. He pitched a story and was chosen to write the film, but, according to him, "they decided, based on what Iron Man 3 was going to be, they weren't going to do War Machine anymore." Marvel subsequently invited him to join its writers program.

In regards to the program, Cole said:

The way it works—and I'm only speaking for myself here—is they give you an office and a character. You read all the comics with that character, then you come up with a story you see for that character. You present it, get notes and if everything moves along, you're greenlit to write the script.

In 2014, Cole wrote a script for a projected movie about the Inhumans.

=== Television ===
In 2016, the television series American Crime Story was released. Cole served as co-producer of the first season, The People v. O. J. Simpson, and wrote two episodes, "The Race Card" (for which he was nominated for a Primetime Emmy Award for Outstanding Writing for a Limited Series, Movie or a Dramatic Special) and "A Jury in Jail".

=== Black Panther ===
While working on The People v. O. J. Simpson, Cole was approached by Marvel Studios' producer Nate Moore, wanting to know if he was willing to write a film about Black Panther. He immediately accepted. Cole was part of a competition, but was ultimately chosen to write the screenplay with director Ryan Coogler.

== Filmography ==
=== Film ===
Year	Title	Director	Writer	Notes
2011	Amber Lake	Yes	Yes	Also editor
2018	Black Panther	No	Yes	
2020	All Day and a Night	Yes	Yes	
2022	Black Panther: Wakanda Forever	No	Yes	
2027	Snoop	No	Yes	Filming

Acting role

- White Dwarf (2014) (As Joe)

=== Television ===
Year	Title	Director	Producer	Writer	Notes
2016	The People v. O. J. Simpson: American Crime Story	No	Yes	Yes	Wrote episodes "The Race Card" and "A Jury in Jail"
2023	Class of '09	Yes	Executive	No	3 episodes

== Awards and nominations ==
Year	Title	Award/Nomination
2016	The People v. O. J. Simpson: American Crime Story	Black Reel Award for Outstanding Screenplay in a TV Movie or Limited Series ("The Race Card"); Writers Guild of America Award for Television: Long Form – Adapted; Nominated–Black Reel Award for Outstanding Screenplay in a TV Movie or Limited Series ("A Jury in Jail"); Nominated–Image Award for Outstanding Writing in a Drama Series ("The Race Card"); Nominated–Primetime Emmy Award for Outstanding Writing for a Limited Series, Movie or a Dramatic Special ("The Race Card")
