= FX Productions =

FX Networks' in-house production company

FX Productions, LLC
- Logo used since 2016
- Trade name: FXP
- Type: Division
- Industry: Television production
- Founded: August 7, 2007; 19 years ago
- Parent: FX Networks

FX Productions, LLC, doing business as FXP, is an American television production company owned by FX Networks, a division of the Disney Entertainment unit of The Walt Disney Company. It was also known in copyright as Bluebush Productions from 2007 to 2017. The studio serves as the in-house production studio for FX, FXX and FX on Hulu, while occasionally producing series for Amazon Prime Video (One Mississippi), Epix (Perpetual Grace, LTD), former sister channel Fox (The Cool Kids and the first season of Wayward Pines), and TBS (Miracle Workers).

== History ==
FX Productions was formed in August 2007 to take stakes in FX programming. Eric Schrier was appointed senior vice president of the company and the post of senior vice president of original programming in charge of current series and alternative programming.

In July 2014, Fox Networks Group and DNA Films formed DNA TV Limited joint venture. Fox Networks Group would have first global first rights with co-financing options to the joint venture's shows. DNA TV would be managed by DNA Films management with Eric Schrier, president of Original Programming for FX Networks and FX Productions handling Fox's joint venture interest.

Paul Simms signed an overall television production deal with FXP in October 2017.

In November 2019, it was announced that a number of new series originally ordered for FX produced by FX Productions before the Disney-Fox merger would be carried over to Hulu as part of the move of FX's streaming presence for most of the network's library not already under contract with another streaming provider. The series would remain under the purview of FX Productions, and be marketed under a new Hulu sub-brand, "FX on Hulu". It was planned by the end of 2021 that a third of Hulu's original series input would be produced by FX Productions. More recently, Debra Moore Munoz has struck a deal with FX Productions.

== Filmography ==
=== Television programs ===
Title	Genre	First aired	Last aired	Number of seasons	Network	Co-production company(s)	Notes
2000s
Rescue Me	Comedy drama	July 21, 2004	September 7, 2011	7	FX	Dreamworks Television and Sony Pictures Television	Took over production from 20th Century Fox Television after first three seasons.
It's Always Sunny in Philadelphia	Sitcom	August 4, 2005	Present	18	FX (Seasons 1–8); FXX (Season 9-present)	3 Arts Entertainment and RCG Productions	Took over production from 20th Century Fox Television after first two seasons
Dirt	Journalism drama	January 2, 2007	April 13, 2008	2	FX	Coquette Productions, Matthew Carnahan Circus Products and ABC Studios	
The Riches	Drama	March 12, 2007	April 29, 2008	2	FX	Maverick Television and Fox Television Studios	
Damages	Legal drama	July 24, 2007	September 12, 2012	5	FX (Seasons 1–3); Audience (Seasons 4–5)	KZK Productions, Sony Pictures Television and Gotham Music Placement	Production company for first 3 seasons only
Sons of Anarchy	Gang drama	September 3, 2008	December 9, 2014	7	FX	The Linson Company, Sutter Ink and Fox 21	
Archer	Animated spy comedy	September 17, 2009	December 17, 2023	14	FX (Seasons 1–7); FXX (Season 8–14)	Floyd County Productions	
The League	Sitcom	October 29, 2009	December 9, 2015	7	FX (Seasons 1-4); FXX (Seasons 5–7)	Chicken Sticks	
2010s
Justified	Crime drama	March 16, 2010	April 14, 2015	6	FX	Rooney McP Productions, Timberman/Beverly Productions, Nemo Films and Sony Pictures Television	
Louie	Sitcom	June 29, 2010	May 28, 2015	5	FX	3 Arts Entertainment and Pig Newton, Inc.	
Lights Out	Drama	January 11, 2011	April 5, 2011	1	FX	Warren Leight Productions, Fineman Entertainment and Fox Television Studios	
Wilfred	Sitcom	June 23, 2011	August 13, 2014	4	FX (Seasons 1-3); FXX (Season 4)	Zook, Inc., Prospect Park, Renegade Australia and SBS Australia	Based on the Australian series of the same name
Unsupervised	Animated sitcom	January 19, 2012	December 20, 2012	1	FX	Floyd County Productions, RCG Productions and The Professional Writing Company	
Brand X with Russell Brand	Talk	June 28, 2012	May 2, 2013	2	FX	Branded Films and Dakota Films	
Totally Biased with W. Kamau Bell	Sketch	August 9, 2012	November 17, 2013	2	FX (Season 1); FXX (Season 2)	CR Enterprises	
Legit	Sitcom	January 17, 2013	May 14, 2014	2	FX (Season 1); FXX (Season 2)	Regular Guy Films and Nugget Productions	
The Americans	Spy drama	January 30, 2013	May 30, 2018	6	FX	Nemo Films, DreamWorks Television (Season 1), Amblin Television (Seasons 2-6) and Fox 21 Television Studios	
The Bridge	Police drama	July 10, 2013	October 1, 2014	2	FX	Shorewood, Inc., Elwood Reid, Inc., Filmlance and Shine America	Based on the Danish series of the same name
Chozen	Animated sitcom	January 13, 2014	March 31, 2014	1	FX	Rough House Pictures and Floyd County Productions	
Fargo	Crime drama	April 15, 2014	Present	5	FX	26 Keys Productions, The Littlefield Company, Mike Zoss Productions (Seasons 1-2), Nomadic Pictures (Seasons 1-3) and MGM Television	Inspired by the 1996 film of the same name
Tyrant	Family drama	June 24, 2014	September 7, 2016	3	FX	Teakwood Lane Productions, Keshet Broadcasting and Fox 21 Television Studios	
The Strain	Horror	July 13, 2014	September 17, 2017	4	FX	Double Dare You and Carlton Cuse Productions	Based on the novel of the same name
Married	Sitcom	July 17, 2014	October 1, 2015	2	FX	Principato-Young Entertainment and Night Eater Productions	
You're the Worst	Sitcom	July 17, 2014	April 3, 2019	5	FX (Season 1); FXX (Seasons 2–5)	Hooptie Entertainment	
Man Seeking Woman	Sitcom	January 14, 2015	March 8, 2017	3	FXX	Broadway Video and Allagash Industries	
The Comedians	Sitcom	April 9, 2015	June 25, 2015	1	FX	Jennilind Productions, Larry Charles Projects, Tamaroa Productions, Flying Glass of Milk Productions, Fabrik Entertainment and Fox 21 Television Studios	
Wayward Pines	Mystery	May 14, 2015	August 8, 2017	2	Fox	Olive Entertainment, Blinding Edge Pictures, De Line Pictures, Storyland and 20th Century Fox Television	Production company for season 1 only. Replaced by 20th Century Fox Television for season 2.
Sex & Drugs & Rock & Roll	Sitcom	July 16, 2015	September 1, 2016	2	FX	Apostle and Fox 21 Television Studios	
The Bastard Executioner	Period drama	September 15, 2015	November 17, 2015	1	FX	Sutter Ink, Imagine Television and Fox 21 Television Studios	
One Mississippi	Sitcom	November 5, 2015	September 8, 2017	2	Amazon Prime Video	Zero Dollars and Zero Sense Productions, Good Egg Productions, Inc., Pig Newton, Inc., 3 Arts Entertainment and Amazon Studios	
Baskets	Sitcom	January 21, 2016	August 22, 2019	4	FX	Billios, 3 Arts Entertainment (Seasons 1-2), Pig Newton, Inc. (Seasons 1-2) and Brillstein Entertainment Partners	
American Crime Story	Crime drama	February 2, 2016	November 9, 2021	3	FX	Scott & Larry Productions, Color Force, Ryan Murphy Television and 20th Television	
Atlanta	Comedy-drama	September 6, 2016	November 10, 2022	4	FX	RBA, 343 Incorporated and MGMT. Entertainment	
Better Things	Sitcom	September 8, 2016	April 25, 2022	5	FX	Slam Book, Inc., 3 Arts Entertainment (Seasons 1-2) and Pig Newton, Inc. (Seasons 1-2)	
Taboo	Drama	January 10, 2017	February 28, 2017	1	FX	Scott Free Productions, Hardy Son & Baker, Sonar Entertainment and BBC	Aired on BBC One in the United Kingdom
Legion	Superhero	February 8, 2017	August 12, 2019	3	FX	26 Keys Productions, The Donners' Company, Bad Hat Harry Productions (Season 1), Kinberg Genre and Marvel Television	
Snowfall	Period drama	July 5, 2017	April 19, 2023	6	FX	Shoe Money Productions, Dave & Ron Productions, New Deal Entertainment, Groundswell Productions and Underground Films	
Trust	Crime drama	March 25, 2018	May 27, 2018	1	FX	Cloud Eight Films, Decibel Films and Snicket Films	
Pose	Period drama	June 3, 2018	June 6, 2021	3	FX	Color Force, Brad Falchuk Teley-Vision, Ryan Murphy Television and 20th Television	
Mayans M.C.	Gang drama	September 4, 2018	July 19, 2023	5	FX	Sutter Ink and 20th Television	Follow-up to Sons of Anarchy
Mr Inbetween	Comedy-drama	September 25, 2018	July 13, 2021	3	FX	Create NSW, Screen Australia, Jungle Entertainment, Blue-Tongue Films and Pariah Productions	Production company for seasons 2-3, Aired on Fox Showcase in Australia
The Cool Kids	Sitcom	September 28, 2018	May 10, 2019	1	Fox	RCG Productions, Enrico Pallazzo, Nest Egg Productions, 3 Arts Entertainment and 20th Century Fox Television	
Miracle Workers	Sitcom	February 12, 2019	August 28, 2023	4	TBS	Broadway Video, Allgash Industries (seasons 1–2), RIP Productions (season 3), Pink Moment Productions (season 3) and Studio T	Second season subtitled "Dark Ages"; Third season subtitled "Oregon Trail"; Fourth season subtitled "End Times"
What We Do in the Shadows	Supernatural comedy	March 27, 2019	December 16, 2024	6	FX	Two Canoes Pictures (Seasons 1–2) and 343 Incorporated	Based on the 2014 film of the same name
Fosse/Verdon	Drama	April 9, 2019	May 28, 2019	1	FX	West Egg Studios, 5000 Broadway Productions, Pyrrhic Victory Productions, Joel Fields Productions, Old 320 Sycamore and Fox 21 Television Studios	Limited series
Perpetual Grace, LTD	Neo-noir thriller	June 2, 2019	August 4, 2019	1	Epix	Escape Artists, Chi-Town Pictures, Elephant Pictures and MGM Television	
Cake	Anthology	September 25, 2019	December 9, 2021	5	FXX	SLAQR	
A Christmas Carol	Drama	December 19, 2019	December 24, 2019	1	FX	Scott Free Productions, Hardy Son & Baker and BBC	Limited series; Aired on BBC One in the United Kingdom
2020s
Breeders	Sitcom	March 2, 2020	September 25, 2023	4	FX	Avalon Television and Sky Original Productions	Aired on Sky One later Sky Comedy in the United Kingdom
Dave	Sitcom	March 4, 2020	May 31, 2023	3	FXX	Dirty Burd, Matthew 6:33, SB Projects, Temple Hill Productions, Hart Beat Productions, Chicken Sticks	
Devs	Mystery	March 5, 2020	April 16, 2020	1	FX on Hulu	DNA TV	Limited series
Mrs. America	Political drama	April 15, 2020	May 27, 2020	1	FX on Hulu	Shiny Penny Productions, Dirty Films, Gowanus Projections and Federal Engineering	Limited series
Dicktown	Animated sitcom	July 9, 2020	March 31, 2022	2	FXX	Floyd County Productions	Spun off from Cake
A Wilderness of Error	Documentary	September 25, 2020	October 2, 2020	1	FX	Truth Media, Rachael Horovitz Productions, Universal Content Productions and Blumhouse Television	Based on the book of the same name
A Teacher	Drama	November 10, 2020	December 29, 2020	1	FX on Hulu	Aggregate Films and Hola Fidel	Limited series; based on the 2013 film of the same name
Black Narcissus	Drama	November 23, 2020		1	FX	DNA TV	Limited series; aired on BBC One in the United Kingdom; based on the novel of the same name
Hip Hop Uncovered	Documentary	February 12, 2021	February 26, 2021	1	FX	Lightbox Entertainment, Five All in the Fifth and The 51	
Hysterical	Documentary	April 2, 2021		1	FX	Campfire and Milestone	TV movie
Pride	Documentary	May 14, 2021	May 21, 2021	1	FX	Vice Studios and Killer Films	
Reservation Dogs	Comedy-drama	August 9, 2021	September 27, 2023	3	FX on Hulu	Piki Films and Film Rites	
Y: The Last Man	Science fiction	September 13, 2021	November 1, 2021	1	FX on Hulu	Future Investigations, Color Force and Witch's Mark Productions	Based on the DC graphic novel series of the same name; removed from Hulu on May 26, 2023
The Premise	Anthology	September 16, 2021	October 7, 2021	1	FX on Hulu	Novak and Le Grisbi Productions	Removed from Hulu on May 26, 2023
Under the Banner of Heaven	Crime drama	April 28, 2022	June 2, 2022	1	FX on Hulu	Hungry Jackal Productions, Aggregate Films and Imagine Television	Limited series; based on the book of the same name
Pistol	Musical drama	May 31, 2022		1	FX on Hulu	Decibel Films, Sir Weighty Tomes, Crescent Moon Media, Jonesy's Jukebox and wiip	Limited series; removed from Hulu on May 26, 2023
The Bear	Comedy-drama	June 23, 2022	June 25, 2026	5	FX on Hulu		
Welcome to Wrexham	Docuseries	August 24, 2022	Present	5	FX	Boardwalk Pictures, 3 Arts Entertainment, Maximum Effort, RCG Productions and DN2 Productions	
Little Demon	Animated horror-comedy	August 25, 2022	October 20, 2022	1	FXX	Harmonious Claptrap, Jersey 2nd Ave, Evil Hag Productions and ShadowMachine	
The Patient	Thriller	August 30, 2022	October 18, 2022	1	FX on Hulu	Joel Fields Productions and Film Flam	Limited series
Kindred	Science fiction-drama	December 13, 2022		1	FX on Hulu	The JS and Protozoa Pictures	Limited series
Class of '09	Drama thriller	May 10, 2023	June 21, 2023	1	FX on Hulu	Color Force	Limited series
The Full Monty	Comedy-drama	June 14, 2023		1	Disney+ (UK); FX on Hulu (US)	Searchlight Television, New Wave Films and Little Island Productions	Limited series; follow-up to 1997 film of the same name
Justified: City Primeval	Crime drama	July 18, 2023	August 29, 2023	1	FX	Sony Pictures Television Studios, MGM Television, Rooney McP Productions, Nemo Films, Timberman/Beverly Productions and Dave & Ron Productions	Limited series; follow-up to Justified
A Murder at the End of the World	Drama thriller	November 14, 2023	December 19, 2023	1	FX on Hulu	Mysterium Valley	Limited series
Shōgun	Period drama	February 27, 2024	Present	1	FX on Hulu	Gate 34 Productions and Michael De Luca Productions	
The Veil	Thriller	April 30, 2024	May 28, 2024	1	FX on Hulu	PatMa Productions and Live & Squalor Pictures	Limited series
Clipped	Sports drama	June 4, 2024	July 2, 2024	1	FX on Hulu	Color Force and Indistinct Chatter	Limited series
English Teacher	Comedy-drama	September 2, 2024	October 16, 2025	2	FX	Brian Jordan Alvarez Productions and 343 Incorporated	
Say Nothing	Historical Drama	November 14, 2024		1	FX on Hulu	Color Force	Limited series
Adults	Comedy	May 28, 2025	Present	2	FX	Cosmic Kid and Good at Bizness Inc.	
Alien: Earth	Science fiction horror	August 12, 2025	Present	2	FX/FX on Hulu	26 Key Productions and Scott Free Productions	Based on Alien
The Lowdown	Drama	September 23, 2025	Present	1	FX	Crazy Eagle Media and Dive	
The Drop: A Snowfall Saga	Crime drama	September 8, 2026	Present	1	FX/FX on Hulu	The 51; Shoe Money Productions; Dave & Ron Productions; Groundswell Productions; Underground Films	Spin-off of Snowfall
