= Ben Is Back =

- Theatrical release poster
- Directed by: Peter Hedges
- Written by: Peter Hedges
- Produced by: Nina Jacobson; Brad Simpson; Teddy Schwarzman; Peter Hedges
- Starring: Julia Roberts; Lucas Hedges; Courtney B. Vance
- Cinematography: Stuart Dryburgh
- Edited by: Ian Blume
- Music by: Dickon Hinchliffe
- Production companies: Black Bear Pictures; 30West; Color Force
- Distributed by: LD Entertainment; Roadside Attractions; Lionsgate
- Release dates: September 8, 2018 (TIFF); December 7, 2018 (United States)
- Running time: 103 minutes
- Country: United States
- Language: English
- Budget: $13 million
- Box office: $12.6 million

Ben Is Back is a 2018 American drama film written and directed by Peter Hedges, and starring Julia Roberts, Lucas Hedges, and Courtney B. Vance. The plot follows a mother who tries to help her addict son after he returns home from rehab.

The film had its world premiere at the Toronto International Film Festival on September 8, 2018, and was theatrically released on December 7, 2018, by LD Entertainment, Roadside Attractions, and Lionsgate. The film received favorable reviews from critics, who praised the performances of Hedges and Roberts, but grossed just $12 million against its $13 million budget.

== Plot ==
Holly Burns returns from church on Christmas Eve to find her son Ben in the driveway; he has been in rehab for prescription drug addiction for some months, and says his sponsor said a trip home would be good for him. Holly is happy to see him but also wary, as she does not want his instability to affect the other children. She agrees to let him stay for 24 hours only if he does not leave her sight.

While holiday shopping at the mall, Holly runs into Ben's former doctor, now an old man with dementia. She scolds him for getting her son hooked on painkillers after a snowboarding accident when Ben was younger. Ben sees his childhood friend, Spencer, also a drug addict. He tells Holly he needs to go to a support group meeting, where he later shares the story of how he almost overdosed, but was saved by his mom and the family dog, Ponce.

Holly finds drugs on Ben and he claims a girl at the meeting gave them to him. Furious, she takes him to the cemetery, asking him where he would like to be buried. That evening, the family returns home from church to find that someone has broken into their home and taken Ponce.

Ben leaves the house to find him. Holly follows in her car, finding Ben in a nearby neighborhood. He blames himself for someone attempting to hurt his family. They search for Ponce together to no avail.

While eating at a diner, Ben tells Holly that he got a local girl, Maggie, hooked on drugs and is responsible for her death. Spencer shows up and, after a tussle, he confirms that Clayton, a drug dealer he used to work for, took Ponce. Ben asks Holly to go home, but she refuses.

Telling her she does not know the real "him," Ben reveals that his sponsor told him not to return home and that he did not get the drugs Holly found from a girl at the support group but rather hidden in the attic above his younger siblings' bedroom. Leaving Holly stranded at a gas station, he goes to meet Clayton. Ben tries to buy his dog back, but Clayton says Ben must do a drug run for him.

Meanwhile, Holly goes to Maggie's mom for help, who gives her a med kit for reviving a person who has suffered an overdose and her car keys to go find Ben. She tracks down Spencer, giving him drugs she had confiscated from Ben earlier, in exchange for him telling her where he might be.

Ben completes the mission and gets Ponce back, but Clayton also gives him some drugs in return. Driving out to an abandoned barn, he parks on the side of the road. He leaves Ponce in the car with a note asking whoever finds it to call his mom.

After looking for Ben all night, Holly is overwrought and goes to a police station. While there, she receives a call from a man who found Ponce, and drives out to retrieve him. Holly follows Ponce to the barn where she finds Ben unconscious, after having taken the drugs from Clayton. She uses the kit and desperately tries to revive him, while sobbing for him to "come back" to her. After a few minutes, Ben takes a breath.

== Cast ==
- Julia Roberts as Holly Burns, Ben and Ivy's mother and Neal's wife
- Lucas Hedges as Ben Burns, Holly's son, Ivy's brother and Neal's stepson
- Courtney B. Vance as Neal Beeby, Ben and Ivy's stepfather and Holly's 2nd husband
- Kathryn Newton as Ivy Burns, Ben's sister, Holly's daughter and Neal's stepdaughter
- Rachel Bay Jones as Beth Conyers, the mother of Ben's deceased ex-girlfriend, Maggie
- David Zaldivar as Spencer "Spider" Webbs, a drug addict and one of Ben's old friends
- Alexandra Park as Cara K, a recovery meeting attendee to whom Ben had dealt drugs
- Michael Esper as Clayton, Ben's former drug supplier who steals Ponce
- Tim Guinee as Phil, recovery meeting attendee
- Henry Stram as Mr. Richman, Ben's high school history teacher who gave Ben oxycontin in exchange for sexual favors
- Myra Lucretia Taylor as Sally, a homeless woman
- Jack Davidson as Dr. Crane, the physician who originally prescribed painkillers for Ben
- Kristin Griffith as Mrs. Crane, Dr. Crane's wife
- Mia Fowler as Lacey Burns-Beeby, Holly and Neal's 10-year-old daughter and Ben and Ivy's little half-sister
- Jakari Fraser as Liam Burns-Beeby, Holly and Neal's 6-year-old son and Ben and Ivy's little half-brother
- Nigel as Ponce, the family dog

== Production ==
The project was announced in October 2017, with Lucas Hedges and Julia Roberts set to star. In November, Kathryn Newton was cast as the titular Ben's sister Ivy, and Alexandra Park joined as an addict Ben meets during an Alcoholics Anonymous meeting. Filming began on December 5, with Courtney B. Vance joining the cast as Ben's stepfather. Filming took place in Yonkers, New City, Sloatsburg, Larchmont, Mamaroneck, Garnerville, and Haverstraw, New York.

== Release ==
In July 2018, LD Entertainment, Roadside Attractions and Lionsgate acquired distribution rights to the film, which they released on December 7, 2018. The film had its world premiere at the Toronto International Film Festival on September 8, 2018.

== Reception ==
=== Critical response ===
According to the review aggregator website Rotten Tomatoes, 81% of critics have given the film a positive review based on 221 reviews, with an average rating of 6.9/10. The website's critics consensus reads, "Refreshingly understated, Ben Is Back subverts family drama stereotypes - and provides a forum for terrific performances from Lucas Hedges and Julia Roberts." At Metacritic, the film has a weighted average score of 66 out of 100 based on 39 reviews, indicating "generally favorable" reviews.

=== Accolades ===
Award	Date of ceremony	Category	Recipient(s)	Result	Ref.
AARP Movies for Grownups Awards	2019	Best Actress	Julia Roberts	Nominated	
AARP Movies for Grownups Awards	2019	Best Screenwriter	Peter Hedges	Nominated	
AARP Movies for Grownups Awards	2019	Best Film -Intergenerational		Nominated	
Beijing Film Festival	2019	Best Film	Peter Hedges	Nominated	
Central Ohio Film Critics Association	2019	Actor of the Year	Lucas Hedges	Nominated	
CinEuphoria Awards	2019	Best Actress - International Competition	Julia Roberts	Nominated	
CinEuphoria Awards	2019	Best Actor - International Competition	Lucas Hedges	Nominated	
German Dubbing Awards	2020	Best Drama		Nominated	
Los Angeles Online Film Critics Society Awards	December 7, 2018	Best Performance by an Actor 23 and Under	Lucas Hedges	Won	
Los Angeles Online Film Critics Society Awards	December 7, 2018	Best Independent Film		Nominated	
North Carolina Film Critics Association	January 3, 2020	Tar Heel Award	Lucas Hedges	Won	

== See also ==
- The Basketball Diaries (film)
- Beautiful Boy (2018 film)
- Four Good Days
