= Nina Jacobson =

American film studio executive (born 1965)

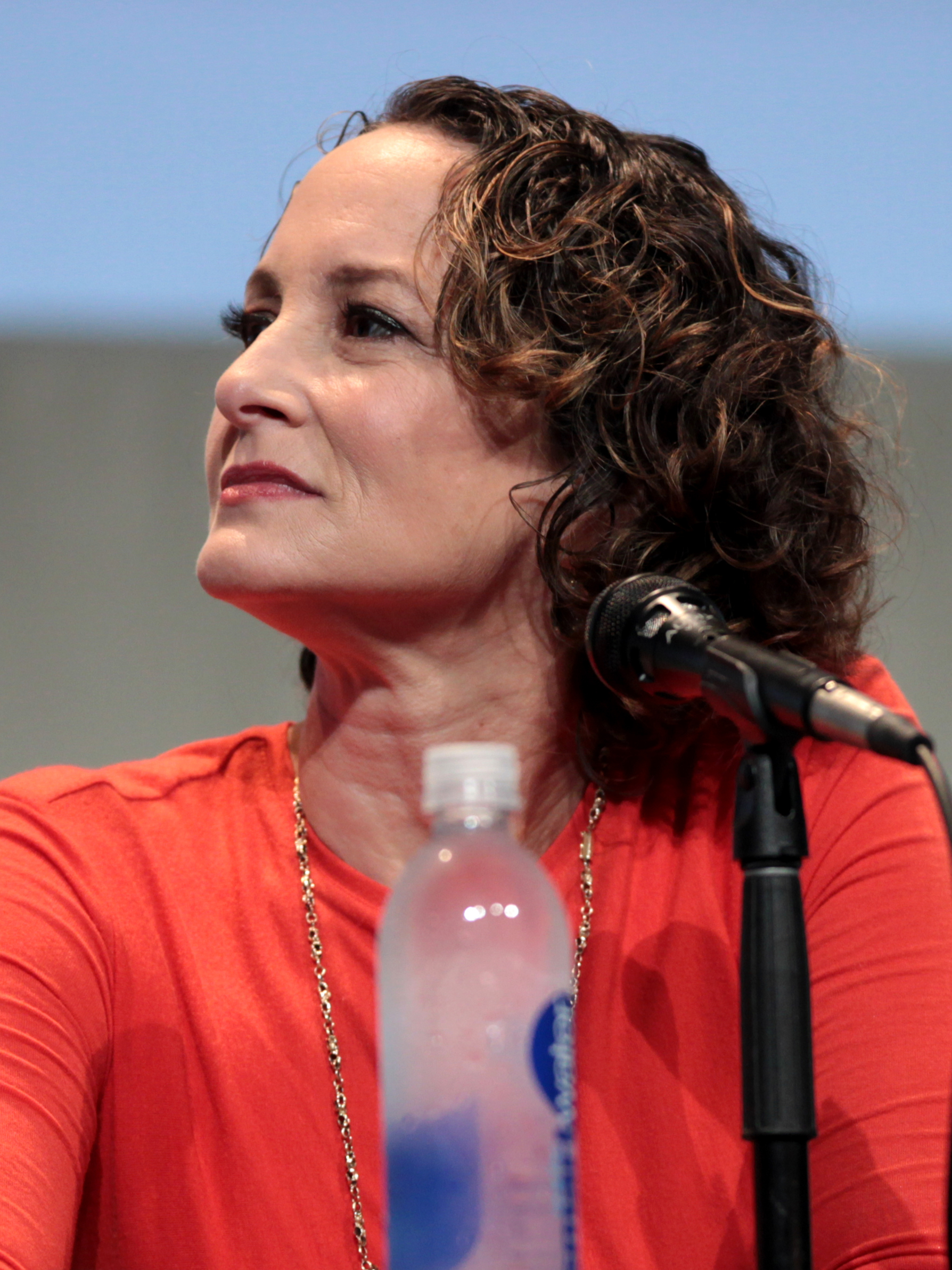
- Jacobson in 2015
- Born: September 15, 1965 (age 61); Los Angeles, California, U.S.
- Education: Brown University
- Occupation: Film executive
- Years active: 1988–present
- Spouse: Jen Bleakley
- Children: 3

Nina Jacobson (born September 15, 1965) is an American film executive who, until July 2006, was president of the Buena Vista Motion Pictures Group, a subsidiary of The Walt Disney Company. With Dawn Steel, Gail Berman and Sherry Lansing, she was one of the last of a handful of women to head a Hollywood film studio since the 1980s. She established her own production company called Color Force in 2007, and was the producer of The Hunger Games film series.

== Personal life ==
Jacobson was born in Los Angeles, to a Jewish family. In 1987, she graduated from Brown University with a degree in semiotics. She began her film career as a documentary researcher. She joined Disney in 1987 as a story analyst but was dismissed in a management change.

Jacobson is married to Jen Bleakley, with whom she has three children. In 1995, she and American Beauty producer Bruce Cohen formed Out There, a collection of gay and lesbian entertainment industry activists.

== Career ==
=== 1988–1997: Early producing roles ===
In 1988, she joined Silver Pictures as director of film development. She was later head of development at MacDonald/Parkes Productions before she joined Universal Pictures as senior vice president of production. There, she took part in the development and production of such projects as Twelve Monkeys and Dazed and Confused.

Later, Jacobson became a senior film executive at DreamWorks SKG where she was responsible for developing What Lies Beneath. She also takes credit for the idea behind DreamWorks' first animated feature Antz. Speaking of her mode of working while listening to pitches for new films, she said, "We start with the obligatory chat about the weather, traffic, sports or politics. Then somebody concludes the chitchat (usually me) and the writer does his or her schpiel. The 'dog and pony.' The desired outcome is for me to love the story and want to buy it. But a big part of my job is to pass. I leap only once every six to eight weeks."

=== 1998–2006: Disney executive ===
In February 1998, she moved to Disney where she was responsible for developing scripts and overseeing film production for Walt Disney Pictures, Touchstone Pictures and Hollywood Pictures. Among her projects as studio executive were The Sixth Sense, Remember the Titans, Pearl Harbor, The Princess Diaries, The Chronicles of Narnia, and the Pirates of the Caribbean franchise. Jacobson was also behind the studio's remakes of The Parent Trap and Freaky Friday. For her efforts at helping expand the role of women in the entertainment industry, Women in Film awarded her the Crystal Award in 2003. In 2005, Forbes magazine named Jacobson one of "The World's 100 Most Powerful Women" in acknowledgement of her success.

Closely associated with film director M. Night Shyamalan at Disney (besides The Sixth Sense, she also worked with him on Unbreakable, Signs and The Village), she and Shyamalan clashed during pre-production of his 2006 film, Lady in the Water. Shyamalan left the studio after Jacobson and others became, in Shyamalan's eyes, overly critical of his script, which would eventually be produced by Warner Bros. Shyamalan is quoted in a book about the difficult period that he "had witnessed the decay of her creative vision right before [his] own wide-open eyes. She didn't want iconoclastic directors. She wanted directors who made money." In her own defense, Jacobson said, "in order to have a Hollywood relationship more closely approximate a real relationship, you have to have a genuine back and forth of the good and the bad. Different people have different ideas about respect. For us, being honest is the greatest show of respect for a filmmaker."

=== 2007–present: Color Force ===
Immediately after the birth of her third child on July 17, 2006, while still in the delivery room, Jacobson was fired over the telephone by Richard Cook, studio chief for The Walt Disney Company. Apparently as part of a studio restructuring, she was replaced by Oren Aviv, marketing chief of the studio. Soon after she was fired, Jacobson quoted Jerry Bruckheimer saying, "There are two kinds of people in this job: the ones who think they'll have it forever and the ones who know they won't." She said she had treated her own job at Disney "as a privilege, not an entitlement." Among her last projects as production executive was The Game Plan, a family comedy released in late September 2007. The film opened number one in its first week at the box office and held the top spot through the second week of release.

By the start of 2007, she was back at work, this time at her own newly established production company, Color Force. Color Force signed a three-year "first-look" production deal with DreamWorks in December 2006. The first feature project released in theaters was Diary of a Wimpy Kid (2010). She also produced the 2011 feature One Day.

Jacobson produced all of the films based on the bestselling Hunger Games trilogy by Suzanne Collins. The first of the four films based on the trilogy was released on March 23, 2012.

In 2015, Color Force mounted its first television series, American Crime Story: The People vs. O.J. Simpson, based on Jeffrey Toobin's 1997 book, The Run of His Life.

Color Force produced the film adaptation of Crazy Rich Asians, which was released in 2018 to general acclaim. The Hollywood Reporter presented Jacobson with its third annual Equity in Entertainment award at its 2018 Women in Entertainment event on December 5, 2018. Previous Equity in Entertainment award winners include Ryan Murphy and Amy Pascal.

Jacobson produced the 2019 film adaptation of the bestselling novel Where'd You Go, Bernadette by Maria Semple which according to the critic's consensus of Rotten Tomatoes "offers dispiriting proof that a talented director, bestselling source material, and terrific cast can add up to far less than the sum of their parts." Jacobson and her production company Color Force also acquired and produced the 2019 adaptation of Donna Tartt's Pulitzer Prize winning novel The Goldfinch which despite the novel's devoted fanbase was universally panned by critics and was named one of the worst films of the year by CBS News. It lost over $50 million, according to The Hollywood Reporter.

=== Other ===
In June 2016, the Human Rights Campaign released a video in tribute to the victims of the Orlando nightclub shooting. In the video, Jacobson and others told the stories of the people killed there.

== Filmography ==
=== Film ===
Producer

- Diary of a Wimpy Kid (2010)
- Diary of a Wimpy Kid: Rodrick Rules (2011)
- One Day (2011)
- The Hunger Games (2012)
- Diary of a Wimpy Kid: Dog Days (2012)
- The Hunger Games: Catching Fire (2013)
- The Hunger Games: Mockingjay – Part 1 (2014)
- The Hunger Games: Mockingjay – Part 2 (2015)
- Diary of a Wimpy Kid: The Long Haul (2017)
- Crazy Rich Asians (2018)
- Ben Is Back (2018)
- Where'd You Go, Bernadette (2019)
- The Goldfinch (2019)
- All Day and a Night (2020)
- Diary of a Wimpy Kid (2021)
- The Hunger Games: The Ballad of Songbirds & Snakes (2023)
- The Hunger Games: Sunrise on the Reaping (2026)

Production executive

- The Game Plan (2007)

Thanks

- Antz (1998)

=== Television ===
Executive producer

- American Crime Story (2016−2021)
- Inside Look: The People v. O.J. Simpson - American Crime Story (2016) (Documentary)
- The Infamous (2016) (TV pilot)
- Pose (2018−2021)
- Y: The Last Man (2021)
- Class of '09 (2023)
- Clipped (2024)
- Say Nothing (2024)
- Love Story (2026)
- The Shards (2026)
