= American Story =

American anthology television franchise

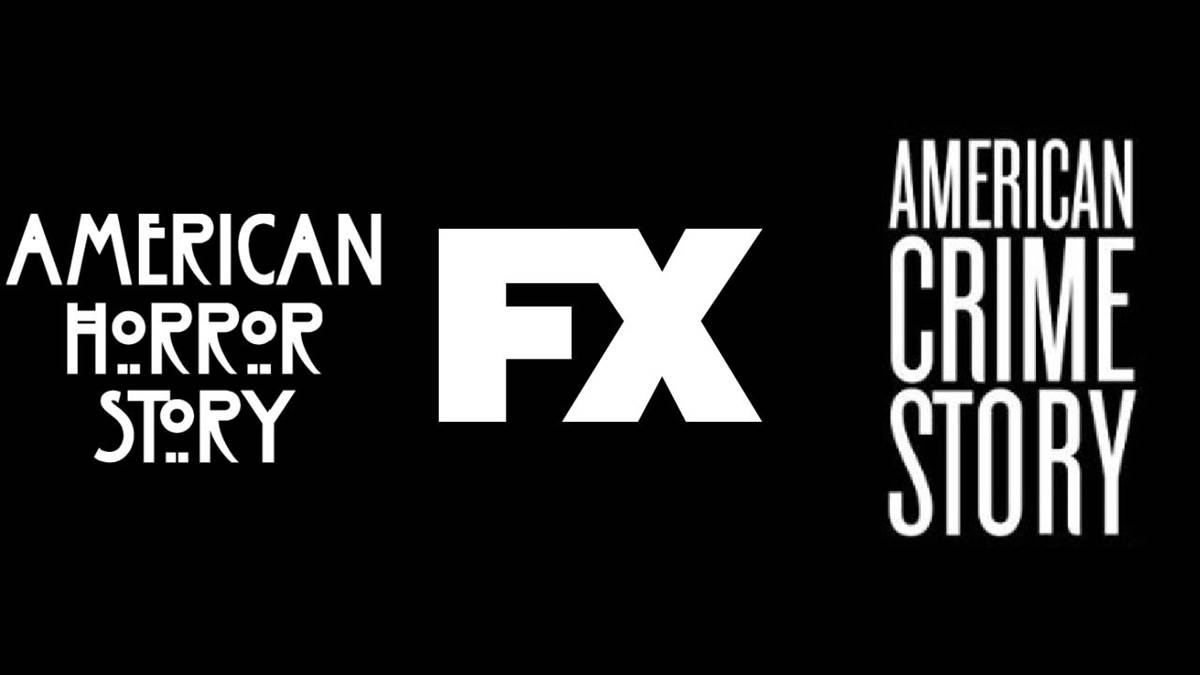
- Logo of FX's American Horror Story and American Crime Story
- Created by: Ryan Murphy; Brad Falchuk
- Original work: American Horror Story
- Owner: FX Networks
- Years: 2011–present

Films and television
- Television series: Horror Story (2011–present); Crime Story (2016–2021); Horror Stories (2021–2024); Sports Story (2024); Love Story (2026)

American Story is an American anthology television franchise consisting of several television series created by Ryan Murphy and Brad Falchuk for the cable network FX and FX on Hulu. Each series follows a different genre of fiction, with each individual season conceived as a self-contained miniseries, following a different set of characters and settings, and a story line with its own "beginning, middle, and end." Some plot elements of each season and series are loosely inspired by true events. Many actors appear in more than one season and series, often playing a new character. The five series consist of Horror Story, Crime Story, Horror Stories, Sports Story, and Love Story.

Actors who have appeared in two or more installments of the franchise include: Sarah Paulson; Cuba Gooding Jr.; Connie Britton; Darren Criss; Finn Wittrock; Jon Jon Briones; Billy Eichner; Matt Bomer, who directed an episode of American Crime Story; Kaia Gerber; Naomi Grossman; Chad James Buchanan; John Carroll Lynch; Dylan McDermott; Charles Melton; Billie Lourd; Jamie Brewer; Naomi Campbell who appears in the form of archive audio in American Crime Story; Celia Finkelstein; Blake Shields; John Lacy; Nico Greetham; Teddy Sears; Judith Light; Rebecca Dayan; Matt Lasky; Cameron Cowperthwaite; Spencer Neville; Denis O'Hare and Gabourey Sidibe. Cody Fern and Max Greenfield have appeared in three installments.

The American Story franchise has received widespread critical acclaim, winning several Emmy Awards.

== Background ==
What you saw in the finale was the end of the Harmon house. The second season of the show will be a brand-new home or building to haunt. Just like this year, every season of this show will have a beginning, middle and end. [The second season] won't be in L.A. It will obviously be in America, but in a completely different locale.

— Murphy on the series' anthology format

Creators Murphy and Falchuk began working on American Horror Story before their Fox series Glee began production. Murphy wanted to do the opposite of what he had done previously and thus began his work on the series. He stated: "I went from Nip/Tuck to Glee, so it made sense that I wanted to do something challenging and dark. And I always had loved, as Brad had, the horror genre. So it just was a natural for me." Falchuk was intrigued by the idea of putting a different angle on the horror genre, stating that their main goal in creating the series was to scare viewers. "You want people to be a little bit off balance afterwards," he said.

In February 2011, FX officially announced that it had ordered a pilot for a possible series from Ryan Murphy and Brad Falchuk, with both Murphy and Falchuk writing and Murphy directing. Dante Di Loreto was announced as executive producer. Production on the series began in April 2011. In July 2011, FX officially announced the project had been picked up to become a full series.

From the beginning, Murphy and Falchuk planned that each season of the series would tell a different story. After the first-season finale aired, Murphy spoke of his plans to change the cast and location for the second season. He did say, however, that some actors who starred in the first season would be returning. "The people that are coming back will be playing completely different characters, creatures, monsters, etc. [The Harmons'] stories are done. People who are coming back will be playing entirely new characters," he announced. In November 2012, FX chief executive, John Landgraf, described the unique format of the series stating: "[T]he notion of doing an anthological series of miniseries with a repertory cast—has proven groundbreaking, wildly successful and will prove to be trendsetting."

On October 7, 2014, it was announced that FX had ordered a 10-episode companion series titled American Crime Story, developed by Scott Alexander and Larry Karaszewski. While each season of American Horror Story focuses on a new horror theme, each season of American Crime Story focuses on a new true crime story. On May 11, 2020, Murphy revealed that a spin-off series named American Horror Stories was being developed; it features self-contained anthological episodes, instead of a season-long story arc as featured in American Horror Story. It was set to air on FX.

On August 13, 2021, it was announced that FX had ordered a new spin-off limited series American Sports Story. The first installment, based on the podcast Gladiator: Aaron Hernandez and Football Inc. from The Boston Globe and Wondery, focuses on the rise and fall of former NFL player Aaron Hernandez. On the same day, it was announced that FX had ordered a new spin-off series Love Story. The first installment depicts the whirlwind courtship and marriage of John F. Kennedy Jr. and Carolyn Bessette-Kennedy.

== Television series ==
Five television series make up the American Story franchise: American Horror Story, American Crime Story, American Horror Stories, American Sports Story, and Love Story. All series in total amount to 217 episodes across 21 seasons of television.

Series	Season	Title	Episodes	Originally released			Showrunner(s)	Status
Series	Season	Title	Episodes	First released	Last released	Network	Showrunner(s)	Status
American Horror Story	1	Murder House	12	October 5, 2011	December 21, 2011	FX	Ryan Murphy	Released
American Horror Story	2	Asylum	13	October 17, 2012	January 23, 2013	FX	Ryan Murphy	Released
American Horror Story	3	Coven	13	October 9, 2013	January 29, 2014	FX	Ryan Murphy	Released
American Horror Story	4	Freak Show	13	October 8, 2014	January 21, 2015	FX	Ryan Murphy	Released
American Horror Story	5	Hotel	12	October 7, 2015	January 13, 2016	FX	Ryan Murphy	Released
American Horror Story	6	Roanoke	10	September 14, 2016	November 16, 2016	FX	Ryan Murphy	Released
American Horror Story	7	Cult	11	September 5, 2017	November 14, 2017	FX	Ryan Murphy	Released
American Horror Story	8	Apocalypse	10	September 12, 2018	November 14, 2018	FX	Ryan Murphy	Released
American Horror Story	9	1984	9	September 18, 2019	November 13, 2019	FX	Ryan Murphy	Released
American Horror Story	10	Double Feature (Note: The tenth season is split into two parts, each of which also has its own subtitle; Red Tide for the first six episodes, and Death Valley for the latter four.)	10	August 25, 2021	October 20, 2021	FX	Ryan Murphy	Released
American Horror Story	11	NYC	10	October 19, 2022	November 16, 2022	FX	Ryan Murphy	Released
American Horror Story	12	Delicate	9	September 20, 2023	April 24, 2024	FX	Halley Feiffer	Released
American Horror Story	13	13	13	September 24, 2026	October 29, 2026	FX	Ryan Murphy	Released
American Horror Story	14	TBA	TBA	TBA	TBA	FX	Ryan Murphy	In development
American Crime Story	1	The People v. O. J. Simpson	10	February 2, 2016	April 5, 2016	FX	Scott Alexander & Larry Karaszewski	Concluded
American Crime Story	2	The Assassination of Gianni Versace	9	January 17, 2018	March 21, 2018	FX	Tom Rob Smith	Concluded
American Crime Story	3	Impeachment	10	September 7, 2021	November 9, 2021	FX	Sarah Burgess	Concluded
American Horror Stories	1	N/A	7	July 15, 2021	August 19, 2021	FX on Hulu	Ryan Murphy and Brad Falchuk	Concluded
American Horror Stories	2	N/A	8	July 21, 2022	September 8, 2022	FX on Hulu	Ryan Murphy and Brad Falchuk	Concluded
American Horror Stories	3	N/A	9	October 26, 2023	October 15, 2024	FX on Hulu	Ryan Murphy and Brad Falchuk	Concluded
American Sports Story	1	Aaron Hernandez	10	September 17, 2024	November 12, 2024	FX; FX on Hulu	Stu Zicherman	Concluded
Love Story	1	John F. Kennedy Jr. & Carolyn Bessette	9	February 12, 2026	March 26, 2026	FX; FX on Hulu	Connor Hines	Released

=== American Horror Story (2011–present) ===
In February 2011, FX officially announced that it had ordered a pilot for a possible series from Ryan Murphy and Brad Falchuk, with both Murphy and Falchuk writing and Murphy directing. Dante Di Loreto was announced as executive producer. Production on the series began in April 2011. In July 2011, FX officially announced the project had been picked up to become a full series.

The series premiered on October 5, 2011, and is broadcast on the cable television channel FX in the United States. In November 2011, it premiered internationally on the respective countries' Fox Networks Group. Each season of American Horror Story focuses on a new horror theme:

1. Murder House: This season takes place in Los Angeles, California in 2011. It premiered on October 5, 2011.
2. Asylum: This season takes place in Massachusetts in 1964. It premiered on October 17, 2012.
3. Coven: This season takes place in New Orleans, Louisiana in 2013. It premiered on October 9, 2013.
4. Freak Show: This season takes place in Jupiter, Florida in 1952. It premiered on October 8, 2014.
5. Hotel: This season takes place in Los Angeles, California in 2015. It premiered on October 7, 2015.
6. Roanoke: This season takes place in North Carolina during 2014–2016. It premiered on September 14, 2016.
7. Cult: This season takes place in the fictional suburb of Brookfield Heights, Michigan, during 2016–2017. It premiered on September 5, 2017.
8. Apocalypse: This season features the return of the witches from Coven as they battle the Antichrist from Murder House in an attempt to prevent the apocalypse. It premiered on September 12, 2018.
9. 1984: This season takes place outside of Los Angeles during the 1980s. It premiered on September 18, 2019.
10. Double Feature: The first part of this season (Red Tide) focuses on transforming people into bloodthirsty killers; the second part (Death Valley) details a government alliance with extraterrestrials. It premiered on August 25, 2021.
11. NYC: This season takes place in 1980s New York City and focuses on a new virus and the murders of gay men. It premiered on October 19, 2022.
12. Delicate: This season takes place in New York City and follows an actress who believes someone is attempting to stop her from getting pregnant. It premiered on September 20, 2023.
13. 13: This season follows a hospice caretaker who takes a job at a residential building inhabited by characters from seasons past. It premiered on September 24, 2026.
14. In October 2026, American Horror Story was renewed for a fourteenth season.

=== American Crime Story (2016–2021) ===
FX announced an order for a 10-episode companion series American Crime Story in October 2014, developed by Scott Alexander and Larry Karaszewski. The series features American Horror Story cast members Sarah Paulson, Connie Britton, Cuba Gooding Jr., Darren Criss, Finn Wittrock, Max Greenfield, Jon Jon Briones, Cody Fern, and Billy Eichner. Substituting a new horror theme for each season, American Crime Story focuses on a new true crime story:

1. The People v. O. J. Simpson premiered in February 2016.
2. The Assassination of Gianni Versace premiered in January 2018.
3. Impeachment premiered in September 2021.

By August 2021, a potential fourth season, tentatively focusing on the rise and fall of Studio 54 owners Steve Rubell and Ian Schrager, had been in development; however, in September 2024, executive producer Brad Simpson stated there are no developments in the production of the season.

=== American Horror Stories (2021–2024) ===
On May 11, 2020, Murphy revealed that a spin-off series named American Horror Stories was being developed; it features self-contained anthological episodes, instead of a season-long story arc as featured in American Horror Story. On June 22, 2020, it was announced that American Horror Stories would stream on FX on Hulu. American Horror Stories premiered on July 15, 2021, and its first season consists of seven episodes. On August 13, 2021, the series was renewed for a second season, Which premiered on July 21, 2022, and consists of eight episodes.

Matt Bomer, Gavin Creel, Sierra McCormick, Paris Jackson, Belissa Escobedo, Merrin Dungey, Selena Sloan, Valerie Loo, Ashley Martin Carter, Kaia Gerber, Aaron Tveit and Celia Finkelstein starred in the first two episodes. Other American Horror Story alums who appeared in the first season include Naomi Grossman, John Carroll Lynch, Charles Melton, Billie Lourd, Chad James Buchanan, Cody Fern, Dylan McDermott and Jamie Brewer along with newcomers Rhenzy Feliz, Madison Bailey, Ben J. Pierce, Leonardo Cecchi, Kyle Red Silverstein, Amy Grabow, Adrienne Barbeau, Kevin McHale, Nico Greetham, Dyllón Burnside, Taneka Johnson, Danny Trejo, Ronen Rubinstein, Virginia Gardner, Vanessa E. Williams, Michael B. Silver, Kimberley Drummond, Jake Choi, Misha Gonz-Cirkl, Tiffany Dupont, Blake Shields, Colin Tandberg, Mercedes Mason, Noah Cyrus, Adam Hagenbuch, John Brotherton, Nicolas Bechtel and Tom Lenk.

Nico Greetham and Cody Fern returned for the second season. Denis O'Hare, Matt Lasky, Gabourey Sidibe, Max Greenfield, Austin Woods, Seth Gabel, Rebecca Dayan, Cameron Cowperthwaite, Spencer Neville and Teddy Sears, who appeared in previous seasons of American Horror Story, also appears in the second season along with newcomers Kristine Froseth, Houston Jax Towe, Abby Corrigan, Simone Recasner, Maryssa Menendez, Emily Morales-Cabrera, Caitlin Dulany, Joel Swetow, Lily Rohren, Vince Yap, Nancy Linehan Charles, Bella Thorne, Anthony De La Torre, Billie Bodega, Addison Timlin, Julia Schlaepfer, Ian Sharkey, Dominique Jackson, Quvenzhané Wallis, Raven Scott, Kyla Drew, Kyanna Simone, Shane Callahan, Ryan D. Madison, Tiffany Yvonne Cox, Judith Light, Britt Lower, Todd Waring, Cornelia Guest, Madison Iseman, Jeff Doucette, Sara Silva, Jessika Van, Chelsea M. Davis, Alicia Silverstone, Olivia Rouyre, Bobby Hogan, Heather Wynters and Jarrod Crawford.

=== American Sports Story (2024) ===
On August 13, 2021, it was announced that FX had ordered a new spin-off limited series American Sports Story. The first installment, based on the podcast Gladiator: Aaron Hernandez and Football Inc. from The Boston Globe and Wondery, focuses on the rise and fall of former NFL player Aaron Hernandez. In January 2023, it was reported that the series was "heading toward production". Principal photography began on April 3, 2023, in Jersey City, New Jersey. Filming was suspended in July due to the 2023 SAG-AFTRA strike. The series premiered on September 17, 2024.

=== Love Story (2026) ===
On August 13, 2021, it was announced that FX had ordered a new spin-off series American Love Story. The first installment depicts the whirlwind courtship and marriage of John F. Kennedy Jr. and Carolyn Bessette-Kennedy. In March 2025, it was reported by Variety that Sarah Pidgeon had been cast the role of Carolyn Bessette-Kennedy In May 2025, it was reported by Variety that Naomi Watts plays Jackie Kennedy, while newcomer Paul Kelly leads the series as John F. Kennedy Jr. On June 6, 2025, the series expanded its cast with Grace Gummer, Sydney Lemmon, and Alessandro Nivola. In a series regular role, Gummer portrays Caroline Kennedy. In recurring roles, Lemmon portrays Lauren Bessette, and Nivola plays Calvin Klein. On June 13, 2025, Ryan Murphy shared a first look at Paul Kelly and Sarah Pidgeon as JFK. Jr. and Carolyn Bessette on his Instagram. Within the same day, it was announced by Murphy that Leila George and Noah Fearnley joined the cast as Kelly Klein and Michael Bergin. In July 2025, Omari K. Chancellor joined the series in a recurring role as Gordon Henderson. The series, later retitled Love Story, premiered on February 12, 2026.

== Reception ==
Critical response of American Story
Title	Season	Rotten Tomatoes	Metacritic
American Horror Story	Murder House	72% (147 reviews)	62 (30 reviews)
American Horror Story	Asylum	84% (220 reviews)	65 (23 reviews)
American Horror Story	Coven	85% (221 reviews)	71 (24 reviews)
American Horror Story	Freak Show	77% (202 reviews)	69 (19 reviews)
American Horror Story	Hotel	64% (214 reviews)	60 (24 reviews)
American Horror Story	Roanoke	74% (160 reviews)	72 (9 reviews)
American Horror Story	Cult	73% (218 reviews)	66 (24 reviews)
American Horror Story	Apocalypse	79% (193 reviews)	63 (6 reviews)
American Horror Story	1984	88% (170 reviews)	—N/a
American Horror Story	Double Feature	80% (61 reviews)	—N/a
American Horror Story	NYC	71% (7 reviews)	—N/a
American Horror Story	Delicate	77% (13 reviews)	57 (8 reviews)
American Horror Story	13	60% (10 reviews)	58 (4 reviews)
American Crime Story	The People v. O. J. Simpson	97% (94 reviews)	90 (45 reviews)
American Crime Story	The Assassination of Gianni Versace	88% (98 reviews)	74 (35 reviews)
American Crime Story	Impeachment	69% (74 reviews)	61 (34 reviews)
American Horror Stories	1	52% (39 reviews)	54 (5 reviews)
American Horror Stories	2	80% (5 reviews)	—N/a
American Sports Story	Aaron Hernandez	74% (23 reviews)	72 (15 reviews)
Love Story	John F. Kennedy Jr. & Carolyn Bessette	84% (31 reviews)"	65 (15 reviews)

== Merchandise ==
=== Promotion ===
As part of the promotion for American Horror Story, FX launched a "House Call" campaign, in which viewers at home could sign up and come face-to-face with a character from the series. Prior to the series premiere, FX released several clues to shine light on the series. They were offered on the show's official YouTube channel. Ten clues were released. In September 2011, FX launched a website which allows visitors to tour the Murder House throughout the decades and look for clues.

In August 2012, the first promo for the second season was released on the American Horror Story Facebook page entitled "Special Delivery", in which a nun carries a couple of buckets filled with body parts through a field. As a church bell rings, the nun empties one bucket's bloody contents, leaving the empty bucket behind, and resumes her trek. Over 20 subsequent teasers were released. Four photos were also released on EW.com. Two televised teasers, titled "Meet the Residents", were released on August 31, 2012. They feature the patients and some staff (such as Dr. Thredson, played by Zachary Quinto, and Sister Mary Eunice, played by Lily Rabe) lying in twin beds and dealing with their individual issues as the heads of the asylum (Jessica Lange, Joseph Fiennes and James Cromwell) look on. The song "Que Sera, Sera", mixed with the show's theme music, plays. To promote Cult, a competition was set up where fans who donated to the Children's Hospital Los Angeles could get a chance to get a walk-on role in an episode, and lunch with Evan Peters.

=== Universal's Halloween Horror Nights ===
On August 16, 2016, FX announced a deal had been struck to feature an American Horror Story maze at Universal Studios Hollywood and Universal Orlando for their Halloween Horror Nights events. The maze featured sets and themes from Murder House, Freak Show, and Hotel. Universal Parks & Resorts said of the experience, "Twisted scenes from Murder House will unleash the evil spirits that possess the Harmon estate, spiraling guests through decades of the tortured dead who previously resided there. In Freak Show, guests joined a troupe of biological misfits in a sinister sideshow where they were stalked by the murderous and deformed Twisty the Clown. Finally, guests succumbed to the warped desires of the Countess after checking into the haunted Hotel Cortez, conceived from the beginning as a torture chamber for its customers." In 2017, the show returned as haunted attractions to both parks, with Universal Orlando having an attraction based on Asylum, Coven, and Roanoke, and Universal Studios Hollywood basing their attraction solely on Roanoke.

In December 2017, The Walt Disney Company announced it would purchase 21st Century Fox which included the 20th Century Fox film and TV assets. The deal was completely finalized on March 20, 2019, making 20th Century Fox officially part of The Walt Disney Studios. As Disney and Universal are bitter rivals in the theme park business (especially for their Central Florida properties), this would likely end the franchise's presence in Halloween Horror Nights at Universal parks.

=== The Night Bites Bakery ===
On July 14, 2021, an American Horror Story themed bakery opened in New York's Meatpacking District in Manhattan until July 24, 2021, to celebrate the release of spin-off American Horror Stories and the tenth season. Guests had to be over the age of 18 to enter the bakery. Guests also had to make reservations for 30 minute visits. It featured sweet treats inspired by the series, as well as unique designs and characters based on past installments of American Horror Story and American Horror Stories. After placing an order, the Rubber Woman, introduced in the first episode of American Horror Stories, delivered the order through a secret window. It opened in Los Angeles from August 4, 2021, until August 14, 2021, in Beverly Grove. The bakery opened in Provincetown, Massachusetts, where the first part of the tenth season were filmed, at Pat's Happy Park on September 1, 2021, till September 4, 2021.
