= American Sports Story =

American drama anthology television series

- Genre: Biographical; Sports drama; Anthology
- Created by: Stu Zicherman
- Starring: Josh Andrés Rivera; Jaylen Barron; Lindsay Mendez; Ean Castellanos; Tammy Blanchard
- Country of origin: United States
- Original language: English
- No. of seasons: 1
- No. of episodes: 10

Production
- Executive producers: Stu Zicherman; Ryan Murphy; Tyson Bidner; Nina Jacobson; Brad Simpson; Alexis Martin Woodall; Eric Kovtun; Hernan Lopez; Carl Franklin; Marshall Lewy; Linda Pizzuti Henry; Ira Napoliello
- Editors: Travis Weaver; Geofrey Hildrew; Hye Mee Na; Danielle Wang; Jordan Bracewell
- Running time: 42–52 Minutes
- Production companies: Sleeping Indian, Inc.; Monarch Pictures; Wondery; The Boston Globe; Color Force; Ryan Murphy Television; 20th Television

Original release
- Network: FX
- Release: September 17 – November 12, 2024

Related
- American Story

American Sports Story is an American biographical sports drama anthology series developed by Stu Zicherman, who also serves as an executive producer alongside Ryan Murphy, Nina Jacobson, Tyson Bidner, Brad Simpson, Alexis Martin Woodall, Eric Kovtun, Hernan Lopez, Marshall Lewy, Linda Pizzuti Henry, and Ira Napoliello. The series serves as the fourth installment in the American Story media franchise, and is broadcast on the cable network FX.

The series, subtitled Aaron Hernandez, is focused on the rise and fall of former NFL player Aaron Hernandez, and premiered on September 17, 2024.

== Cast ==
=== Main ===
- Josh Andrés Rivera as Aaron Hernandez
- Jaylen Barron as Shayanna Jenkins
- Lindsay Mendez as Tanya Singleton
- Ean Castellanos as DJ Hernandez
- Tammy Blanchard as Terri Hernandez
- Vincent Laresca as Dennis Hernandez

=== Recurring ===
- Patrick Schwarzenegger as Tim Tebow
- Tony Yazbeck as Urban Meyer
- Jake Cannavale as Chris
- Kalama Epstein as Dennis Sansoucie
- Catfish Jean as Ernest "Bo" Wallace
- Thomas Sadoski as Brian Murphy
- Roland Buck III as Alexander “Sherrod” Bradley
- Norbert Leo Butz as Bill Belichick
- Kwadarrius Smith as Gameday Deion Branch
- Laith Wallschleger as Rob Gronkowski

== Production ==
=== Development ===
On August 13, 2021, it was announced that FX had ordered a new spin-off limited series American Sports Story. The series, which is based on the podcast Gladiator: Aaron Hernandez and Football Inc. from The Boston Globe and Wondery, focuses on the rise and fall of former NFL player Aaron Hernandez. Specifically, the series explores the disparate strands of Hernandez's identity, his family, his career, his suicide and their legacy in sports and American culture.

=== Casting ===
By January 2023, John Landgraf stated that the series was "heading toward production" as there was a "fairly complete set of scripts" from Stu Zicherman, although no premiere date was set. In November 2023, it was reported that Josh Andrés Rivera, Patrick Schwarzenegger, Lindsay Mendez, Tony Yazbeck, Jake Cannavale, and Catfish Jean had joined the cast.

=== Filming ===
Principal photography began on April 3, 2023, in Jersey City, New Jersey. Filming was suspended in July due to the 2023 SAG-AFTRA strike, and resumed in December. Filming continued further in March 2024 at Camping World Stadium in Orlando, Florida.

== Episodes ==
No.	Title	Directed by	Written by	Original release date	U.S. viewers (millions)
1	"If It's to Be"	Carl Franklin	Stuart Zicherman	September 17, 2024	0.273
2	"Consequences, with Extreme Prejudice"	Carl Franklin	Ryan Farley	September 17, 2024	0.273
3	"Pray the Gay Away"	Paris Barclay	Chelsey Lora	September 24, 2024	0.207
4	"Birthday Money"	Paris Barclay	Ryan Farley & Chelsey Lora	October 1, 2024	0.140
5	"The Man"	Maggie Kiley	Domonique Foxworth & Liz Tuccillo	October 8, 2024	0.184
6	"Herald Street"	Maggie Kiley	Matthew Hodgson	October 15, 2024	0.158
7	"Dirty Pain"	Steven Canals	Lee Edward Colston II	October 22, 2024	0.190
8	"Odin"	Steven Canals	Hadi Nicholas Deeb	October 29, 2024	0.153
9	"What's Left Behind"	Jennifer Lynch	Hadi Nicholas Deeb & Stacey McCormack	November 5, 2024	0.185
10	"Who Killed Aaron Hernandez?"	Michael Uppendahl	Stuart Zicherman & Tracey Scott Wilson	November 12, 2024	0.160

== Release ==
=== Broadcast ===
American Sports Story premiered with its first two episodes on FX on September 17, 2024. Following its two-episode premiere, the series was released with one new episode each week leading up to the finale in November. In Canada, the series aired on the linear channel FX, with the first two episodes premiering on Tuesday, September 17, at 10 p.m. ET / 7 p.m. PT. Subsequent episodes air weekly on Tuesdays at the same time.

=== Streaming ===
New episodes of American Sports Story: Aaron Hernandez were made available to stream on Hulu after the 10 PM FX premiere on Tuesdays. Internationally, the series was made available to stream on Disney+.

American Sports Story debuted at No. 1 on Hulu's "Top 15 Today"—a daily updated list of the platform's most-watched titles—on its first full day of release and remained on the list for ten consecutive days as of October 1, alongside other Ryan Murphy-produced series like Grotesquerie and Doctor Odyssey. It later ranked No. 3 on Hulu's "Top 15 Today" list on October 4. The show reclaimed the No. 1 spot on Hulu in November 2024, nearly two months after its premiere. According to market research company Parrot Analytics, which tracks consumer engagement across streaming, downloads, and social media, American Sports Story had an audience demand 6.1 times higher than the average show in the United Kingdom in December 2024, placing it in the top 8.6% of all tracked titles. Audience demand for the show in the UK increased by 49.7% in December. Its peak demand reached 13.4 times the average. The UK accounted for 42% of the show's U.S. demand.

== Reception ==
=== Critical response ===
On the review aggregator website Rotten Tomatoes, American Sports Story has an approval rating of 74% based on 23 reviews, with an average rating of 7.10/10. The website's critical consensus states, "American Sports Story dramatizes the tragic case of Aaron Hernandez with slick efficiency and some debatable insinuations about his motivations, with Josh Rivera's terrific performance giving the sad saga a compelling core." Metacritic, which uses a weighted average, assigned a score of 72 out of 100 based on 15 critics, indicating "generally favorable" reviews.

Amy Amatangelo of The A.V. Club complimented American Sports Story for offering a fresh perspective on Hernandez's downfall, focusing on broader themes such as the football industry's impact on players and the cultural pressures surrounding masculinity. She highlighted the show's exploration of Hernandez's struggles with repressed sexuality, childhood trauma, and the physical toll of playing football, including CTE, without offering excuses for his actions. Amatangelo appreciated Rivera's portrayal of Hernandez, capturing both his charm and volatile nature. She noted the series' dramatic license, which adds new layers to the story, and its ability to put football itself on trial, questioning the industry's responsibility for its players. Keith Phipps of TV Guide said that American Sports Story avoids sensationalizing Hernandez's life, instead providing a nuanced portrayal of his downfall. He appreciated Rivera's performance, highlighting how the actor balances the character's anger, paranoia, and vulnerability, showing Hernandez as both a victim and a villain. Phipps found that the series effectively examines the various factors influencing Hernandez, including a demanding father, a history of abuse, drug dependency, his sexuality, and the long-term effects of concussions. He appreciated how the show delves into such themes without resorting to exploitative treatment, particularly in episodes dealing with Hernandez's relationship with Tim Tebow.

Alex Kirshner of Slate praised American Sports Story for its portrayal of Hernandez's life, particularly its casting, which he found to be realistic, with characters like Rivera as Hernandez and Yazbeck as Urban Meyer receiving particular attention. He appreciated the series' attention to detail, especially in depicting college football and the NFL, and how it successfully paints an engaging picture of Hernandez's environment, including the flaws in his support systems. Kirshner noted that the show provides a plausible interpretation of the factors that may have contributed to Hernandez's downfall, though it does not break new ground in terms of understanding his motivations. However, he found the writing occasionally overemphasized certain aspects, such as Hernandez's college celebrity. Matthew Creith of TheWrap appreciated American Sports Story's portrayal of Hernandez's troubled life, emphasizing his struggle with a closeted identity and the impact of cultural attitudes toward masculinity in the early 2000s. He highlighted Rivera's performance as a vulnerable Hernandez, noting his physical transformation and emotional depth. While he found the show engaging, Creith pointed out that it sometimes oversimplifies certain aspects, such as the representation of real-life figures like Bill Belichick and Robert Kraft, turning them into caricatures. He also acknowledged the series' risk-taking in addressing sensitive topics but felt it leaned too heavily on sensational moments, with the issue of head injuries and CTE only treated as a secondary concern.

=== Ratings ===
The premiere episode recorded 273,000 viewers (P2+) with a 0.09% rating and 214,000 household viewers (0.17 rating). As of November 12, 2024, the program had 160,000 viewers (0.05% rating), reflecting a 14% decrease from the 185,000 viewers reported on November 5. On November 12, household viewership was 138,500 (0.11 rating), with 53,500 viewers in the 18–49 demographic (0.04 rating) and 62,000 in the 25–54 demographic (0.05 rating). Since its debut, the program's P2+ ratings have ranged between 0.04% and 0.09%, with weekly viewership figures between 140,000 and 273,000.

=== Accolades ===
Year	Award	Category	Nominee(s)	Result	Ref.
2025	Black Reel Awards for Television	Outstanding Directing in a TV Movie or Limited Series	Paris Barclay	Nominated	
2025	Imagen Foundation Awards	Best Actor - Drama	Josh Andrés Rivera	Nominated	
2025	Imagen Foundation Awards	Best Supporting Actress - Drama	Jaylen Barron	Nominated	

== Impact ==
American Sports Story garnered attention after a scene featuring Laith Wallschleger as Rob Gronkowski went viral on social media. This was notably observed on "NFL Twitter," where the clip was shared by NFL writer Dov Kleiman and others. The comedic exchange between Gronkowski and Aaron Hernandez led to widespread sharing and commentary online. Gronkowski acknowledged that Wallschleger, who serves as his body double in various projects, effectively embodied his persona in a manner that aligned with the style of the series.
