= American Horror Stories =

American horror anthology television series

- Genre: Horror; Anthology
- Created by: Ryan Murphy; Brad Falchuk
- Theme music composer: César Dávila-Irizarry; Charlie Clouser
- Composer: Mac Quayle
- Country of origin: United States
- Original language: English
- No. of seasons: 3
- No. of episodes: 24

Production
- Executive producers: Ryan Murphy; Brad Falchuk; Alexis Martin Woodall; John J. Gray; Loni Peristere; Manny Coto; Crystal Liu
- Producers: Susan V. McConnell; Todd Nenninger; Lou Eyrich; Eryn Krueger Mekash; Reilly Smith; Todd Kubrak
- Cinematography: Shasta Spahn
- Editors: Peggy Tachdjian; Lousine Shamamian
- Running time: 38–53 minutes
- Production companies: Brad Falchuk Teley-Vision; Ryan Murphy Television; 20th Television

Original release
- Network: FX on Hulu
- Release: July 15, 2021 – October 15, 2024

Related
- American Story; American Horror Story

American Horror Stories is an American horror anthology television series created by Ryan Murphy and Brad Falchuk for FX on Hulu. The series serves as a direct spin-off and companion to American Horror Story, and is the third installment in the American Story franchise. Unlike American Horror Story, which typically tells a new story each season (with one exception), American Horror Stories features a different story in each individual episode, apart from the two-part premiere and the connected finale of the first season.

Returning cast members from the original show, usually playing a new character, include Matt Bomer, Celia Finkelstein, Naomi Grossman, John Carroll Lynch, Charles Melton, Billie Lourd, Chad James Buchanan, Cody Fern, Dylan McDermott, Jamie Brewer, Denis O'Hare, Matt Lasky, Gabourey Sidibe, Max Greenfield, Austin Woods, Seth Gabel, Rebecca Dayan, Cameron Cowperthwaite, Spencer Neville, Teddy Sears, Jeff Hiller, Casey Thomas Brown, and Nick Jacobs.

American Horror Stories premiered on Hulu on July 15, 2021. It became the most successful launch of any FX on Hulu series to date. The second season premiered in July 2022, while the third season was released in two parts, in October 2023 and October 2024.

== Premise ==
American Horror Stories is a weekly anthology series in which each episode presents a different horror story. Some episodes are connected to past American Horror Story seasons. The episodes "Rubber(wo)Man Part One," "Rubber(wo)Man Part Two," and "Game Over" are linked to American Horror Story: Murder House, while "Dollhouse" connects to American Horror Story: Coven.

== Production ==
=== Development ===
On May 11, 2020, Murphy revealed that a spin-off series named American Horror Stories was being developed, which would feature self-contained anthological episodes, instead of a season-long story arc as featured in American Horror Story. The first season consists of seven episodes. On August 13, 2021, FX renewed the series for a second season of eight episodes.

The next installment was first reported in May 2023, when it was affected by the 2023 Writers Guild of America strike. In August, it was announced that the episodes would premiere on October 26 as a four-episode "Huluween" event. The next installment of five episodes was first reported on in September 2024 with an expected premiere date of October 15, 2024, as another "Huluween" event, with The Hollywood Reporter referring to it as the fourth season.

=== Casting ===
Matt Bomer, Gavin Creel, Sierra McCormick, Paris Jackson, Belissa Escobedo, Merrin Dungey, Selena Sloan, Ashley Martin Carter, Valerie Loo, Kaia Gerber, Aaron Tveit and Celia Finkelstein starred in the first two episodes. Other American Horror Story alums who appeared in the first season include Naomi Grossman, John Carroll Lynch, Charles Melton, Billie Lourd, Chad James Buchanan, Cody Fern, Dylan McDermott and Jamie Brewer along with newcomers Rhenzy Feliz, Madison Bailey, Miss Benny, Leonardo Cecchi, Kyle Red Silverstein, Brandon Papo, Amy Grabow, Adrienne Barbeau, Kevin McHale, Nico Greetham, Dyllón Burnside, Taneka Johnson, Danny Trejo, Ronen Rubinstein, Virginia Gardner, Vanessa E. Williams, Michael B. Silver, Kimberley Drummond, Jake Choi, Misha Gonz-Cirkl, Tiffany Dupont, Blake Shields, Colin Tandberg, Mercedes Mason, Noah Cyrus, Adam Hagenbuch, John Brotherton, Nicolas Bechtel and Tom Lenk.

Nico Greetham and Cody Fern returned for the second season. Denis O'Hare, Matt Lasky, Gabourey Sidibe, Max Greenfield, Austin Woods, Seth Gabel, Rebecca Dayan, Cameron Cowperthwaite, Spencer Neville and Teddy Sears, who appeared in previous seasons of American Horror Story, appeared in the second season along with newcomers Kristine Froseth, Houston Towe, Abby Corrigan, Simone Recasner, Maryssa Menendez, Emily Morales-Cabrera, Caitlin Dulany, Joel Swetow, Lily Rohren, Vince Yap, Nancy Linehan Charles, Bella Thorne, Anthony De La Torre, Billie Bodega, Julia Schlaepfer, Addison Timlin, Ian Sharkey, Dominique Jackson, Quvenzhané Wallis, Raven Scott, Kyla Drew, Kyanna Simone, Shane Callahan, Ryan Madison, Tiffany Yvonne Cox, Judith Light, Britt Lower, Todd Waring, Cornelia Guest, Madison Iseman, Jeff Doucette, Sara Silva, Jessika Van, Chelsea M. Davis, Alicia Silverstone, Olivia Rouyre, Bobby Hogan, Heather Wynters and Jarrod Crawford.

Seth Gabel, Cameron Cowperthwaite, and Dyllón Burnside returned for the third season. Jeff Hiller, Casey Thomas Brown, and Nick Jacobs, who all appeared previously in American Horror Story: NYC appeared in the third season, along with newcomers Jessica Barden, Emma Halleen, Amrou Al-Kadhi, Allius Barnes, Gwyneth Paltrow, Reid Scott, Annie Hamilton, Christopher Fitzgerald, Maury Ginsberg, Lisa Rinna, Laura Kariuki, Rob Yang, Hazel Graye, Raúl Castillo, Emily Browning, Havana Rose Liu, Susan Pourfar, Jeff Adler, Drew Moore, Patrick Breen, Maria Tucci, Laila Robins, Michael Imperioli, Matthew Maher, David Pittu, Natalie Gold, Victor Garber, Guy Burnet, Dagmara Domińczyk, David Deblinger, Mia Isaac, Jennifer Ferrin, Kate Eastman, Henry Winkler, Henry Eikenberry, Hudson Oz, Daniel Zolghadri, Angel Bismark, Billy Carter, Michael Cyril Creighton, June Squibb, Debby Ryan, Melanie Field, Melonie Diaz, Matthew Del Negro, Frank Pando, and Matthew Holcomb.

=== Filming ===
On August 4, 2020, it was announced that Sarah Paulson was set to direct an episode on the series, but she ultimately did not do so. In 2023, it was revealed that the third season was filmed in New Jersey.

=== Title sequences ===
Every episode of the series has its own title sequence, with the exception of the first and second episodes, which share the same one, to connect to the theme of each episode. The title sequence was created by Elastic. They also created the title sequence for the HBO series Game of Thrones. The same theme music and font of American Horror Story is used during the opening credits. "The Naughty List", the fourth episode of the first season, uses the same remix of the theme music as American Horror Story: 1984 but high pitched. Starting with season 3, a new logo and font are used for the titles.

== Episodes ==
Season	Episodes		Originally released	
Season	Episodes		First released	Last released
1	7		July 15, 2021	August 19, 2021
2	8		July 21, 2022	September 8, 2022
3	9	4	October 26, 2023	
3	9	5	October 15, 2024	

=== Season 1 (2021) ===
No. overall	No. in season	Title	Directed by	Written by	Original release date
1	1	"Rubber(wo)Man Part One"	Loni Peristere	Ryan Murphy & Brad Falchuk	July 15, 2021
Scarlett Winslow and her house-flipping fathers Michael and Troy move into the infamous Murder House. Scarlett sneaks out to attend a sleepover at her crush Maya's house. Later that night, Maya invites Scarlett back to her bedroom away from the others. They kiss and Scarlett shares her violent sexual desires. Texts from her best friend Shanti reveal to Scarlett that Maya and her friends are pulling a cruel prank on her by live-streaming their conversation. To get revenge after a fantasy of one while masturbating, Scarlett lures Maya and her friends to the basement of Murder House, where she murders them, while wearing the Rubber Man suit. The next day, Scarlett opens her door to find the Rubber Man outside. Cast: Matt Bomer, Gavin Creel, Sierra McCormick, Paris Jackson, Belissa Escobedo, Merrin Dungey, Selena Sloan, Ashley Martin Carter, Valerie Loo
2	2	"Rubber(wo)Man Part Two"	Loni Peristere	Brad Falchuk	July 15, 2021
Scarlett forms a relationship with Ruby, the ghost of a young woman who snuck into the Murder House to commit suicide as they relax in the same bathtub. Troy begins to cheat on Michael with a contractor named Adam. After discovering the bodies of Maya and her friends behind a brick wall, Adam blackmails Michael and Troy only to be slain by the Rubber Man. Michael and Troy try to flee the house, but find they cannot leave. They find out that they were murdered earlier by Ruby to persuade Scarlett to stay with her in the Murder House forever. On Halloween, Scarlett and Ruby venture out of the house. The ghosts of Maya and her friends pursue them to get revenge on Scarlett, but they are unsuccessful. At dawn, Scarlett resolves to move out of the Murder House while promising Ruby that she will visit her every Halloween. Cast: Matt Bomer, Gavin Creel, Sierra McCormick, Kaia Gerber, Paris Jackson, Belissa Escobedo, Merrin Dungey, Aaron Tveit, Selena Sloan, Ashley Martin Carter, Valerie Loo, Celia Finkelstein
3	3	"Drive In"	Eduardo Sánchez	Manny Coto	July 22, 2021
Kelley and her boyfriend Chad attend a drive-in screening of a banned film Rabbit Rabbit. The film was banned thanks to Tipper Gore after it caused the premiere's audience to kill each other upon their eyes turning black. The film's director Larry Bitterman attacks Tipper at a congressional hearing after she gloats about the studio burning all remaining copies. He is jailed for the assault. In the present, Kelley and Chad make out as the film starts. Unable to see Rabbit Rabbit through fogged-up windows, they are unaffected as mass violence erupts. Everyone who watches the film is attacking and devouring one another. Kelley and Chad flee to the projection room and destroy the film. Hours pass and instead of going to the cops, the two decide to find Larry and force him to hand over all copies. Once found, Kelley shoots Larry's kneecaps and Chad burns the original film. Larry taunts them as his trailer burns down and they leave him for dead. The two go back to Chad's and celebrate. As they kiss, the camera pans to Rabbit Rabbit being promoted on Netflix. Then the window shows the Los Angeles skyline erupting in flames. Cast: Rhenzy Feliz, Madison Bailey, Ben J. Pierce, Naomi Grossman, Leonardo Cecchi, Kyle Red Silverstein, Amy Grabow, Adrienne Barbeau, John Carroll Lynch
4	4	"The Naughty List"	Max Winkler	Manny Coto	July 29, 2021
Youtubers Wyatt, Zinn, Barry, and James live in "The Bro House" content house. After failing to regain their popularity following a controversy where they uploaded a video of a man dying, they film a prank video making fun of a Mall Santa. On Christmas Eve, the boys upload the video, later getting a call from a detective stating that the Santa in their video was an imposter, as the real Mall Santa was found dead. The imposter Santa invades their house, uploading himself killing Wyatt and Zinn to the Bro House channel, along with a linked article identifying himself as the Wild Man, a minor pagan god and Satanic killer of the "naughty" after whom the legend of Santa Claus was inspired. The Wild Man then shoots at Barry and James in the driveway, killing James and dragging Barry back into the house. Their channel reaches five million subscribers as the Wild Man sets the house and Barry on fire; Barry jumps into the pool to put himself out. On Christmas Day, the police find the other boys' body parts adorning their Christmas tree, as elsewhere, the Wild Man prepares to murder another Mall Santa. Cast: Kevin McHale, Nico Greetham, Dyllón Burnside, Charles Melton, Taneka Johnson, Danny Trejo
5	5	"BA'AL"	Sanaa Hamri	Ali Adler & Manny Coto	August 5, 2021
Struggling to get pregnant, Liv Whitley receives a totem from Bernadette, a fertility clinic receptionist. She successfully gets pregnant and has a son, Aaron, with her husband, Matt. Sixteen months later, Liv begins suffering from postpartum depression and begins seeing visions of Ba'al, who haunts Aaron. Liv seeks out Bernadette, who shares a banishment ritual with her. During the ritual, Liv accidentally stabs Matt and is committed to an asylum. It is revealed that Matt had been having an affair with Bernadette and sabotaged Liv's efforts to get pregnant. After having Aaron, he and his college friends gaslit Liv by faking the supernatural events to have her committed and take her money. While celebrating his success, the real Ba'al appears, having been summoned by Liv, and slaughters Bernadette and Matt's friends. The banishment ritual Bernadette gave her turned out to be an authentic summoning spell. Matt is sent to prison, and Ba'al appears in Liv's bedroom. He demands to be released; She agrees on the condition that he gives her another baby. Cast: Ronen Rubinstein, Billie Lourd, Virginia Gardner, Vanessa Williams, Michael B. Silver, Kimberley Drummond, Chad James Buchanan, Jake Choi, Misha Gonz-Cirkl
6	6	"Feral"	Manny Coto	Manny Coto	August 12, 2021
A boy named Jacob Gantz disappears on a camping trip with his parents Jay and Addy. Ten years later, a hunter named Bob offers to take them into the woods to find Jacob. Once there, the group is hunted by wild deformed humans. Bob reveals it was all a hoax and he plans to rob them. Bob is attacked and devoured by the wild humans. Jay and Addy seek refuge at a ranger station staffed by a park ranger named Stan. He divulges that the National Park Service was created by the government to protect the public from the "Feral Nation", a subpopulation of feral cannibals that have an indeterminate origin. As Stan tries to radio his superiors, the ranger station is attacked by the ferals and Stan is killed by a rafter feral. Jay and Addy flee and find that their now-grown son is now the leader of the ferals and sitting on a throne of bones. When a tall bearded feral asks Jacob who they are, he responds in their language "dinner". The ferals swarm over Jay and Addy to devour them. A blood splatter lands on Jacob's cheek, which he wipes off with his finger and tastes. Cast: Cody Fern, Aaron Tveit, Tiffany Dupont, Blake Shields, Colin Tandberg
7	7	"Game Over"	Liz Friedlander	Ryan Murphy & Brad Falchuk	August 19, 2021
Video game designer Michelle enters the Murder House on Halloween Night to conduct research for her newest game, based on the legend of the house. While there, she is stabbed to death by Ruby and Scarlett. One year later on Halloween, Michelle finds her son Rory and claims there is no escaping the Murder House. Rory offers to burn it down, but Michelle refuses. Ignoring his mother, Rory shows up with gasoline canisters. While Ruby tries to stop him, she is stopped by the other ghosts who are tired of their suffering. As Scarlett arrives to help Ruby, the house is set ablaze. Three years later, condos have been built where the Murder House once stood. Scarlett purchases the last unit to reunite with Ruby who mentioned that the other ghosts have crossed over. It turns out that the events of the story have been a playthrough of the finished video game which Rory is impressed with. Cast: Dylan McDermott, Sierra McCormick, Kaia Gerber, Paris Jackson, Merrin Dungey, Mercedes Mason, Noah Cyrus, Adam Hagenbuch, Jamie Brewer, John Brotherton, Nicolas Bechtel, Tom Lenk, Selena Sloan, Ashley Martin Carter, Valerie Loo

=== Season 2 (2022) ===
No. overall	No. in season	Title	Directed by	Written by	Original release date
8	1	"Dollhouse"	Loni Peristere	Manny Coto	July 21, 2022
Crazed dollmaker Van Wirt kidnaps Coby to bring her to his personal doll collection on his property. She joins several other kidnapped women: Aurelia, Harlene, Faye and Bonnie. They tell Coby that after murdering his adulterous wife, Van Wirt wants a replacement mother for his son Otis and has decided that the women should compete for the honor in a "pageant". Otis warms to Coby, who entertains him with her powers of telekinesis. During the pageant, Faye and Bonnie fail Van Wirt's tests and are killed. The remaining women plot to escape. Coby refuses to leave without going back for Otis, but is captured and Van Wirt's assistant Eustace kills Harlene and Aurelia. Since Coby risked her life to save Otis, Van Wirt declares her the winner and encases her in plastic to serve as a living "doll." However, two witches arrive and identify Coby as one of them. They rescue her and set fire to the house, killing Van Wirt and Eustace. Coby and Otis join the witches at Miss Robichaux's Academy. Now going by his middle name of Spalding for his own safety, and raised by Coby, Otis meets a girl named Myrtle Snow. Cast: Denis O'Hare, Kristine Froseth, Houston Jax Towe, Abby Corrigan, Simone Recasner, Maryssa Menendez, Emily Morales-Cabrera, Matt Lasky, Caitlin Dulany
9	2	"Aura"	Max Winkler	Manny Coto	July 28, 2022
After moving home, Jaslyn buys Aura, a smart doorbell device. Aura's camera shows her an old man outside; he calls out to her by name and attempts to enter, but there is no trace of him. Jaslyn's husband Bryce believes it is a prank, but she realizes the man is the ghost of Mr. Hendricks, the janitor at her high school. Hendricks apologizes for sexually harassing her in the past, then disappears. Another ghost soon appears via Aura, and Bryce again insists it is a prank. Jaslyn learns that Aura detects spirits through electromagnetism and that the ghost Mary Jeane died in an apparent hit and run. Bryce confesses he was previously engaged to Mary Jeane, but pushed her in front of a car after learning she was pregnant; the car did not kill her, so he broke her neck. He attacks Jaslyn, but is killed by Mary Jeane's ghost. Three months later, Jaslyn has moved into a new apartment that has Aura installed. Bryce's enraged ghost appears on Aura's camera and attempts to break into the apartment. Cast: Gabourey Sidibe, Max Greenfield, Joel Swetow, Lily Rohren, Vince Yap, Nancy Linehan Charles
10	3	"Drive"	Yangzom Brauen	Manny Coto	August 4, 2022
At the end of a night out, Marci is chased by an unknown man in a Jeep. She is determined to continue partying in clubs, despite being warned by her husband Chaz about news reports of local people disappearing from clubs. Chaz feels that their open marriage is no longer working and decides to separate from her. Meanwhile, her friend Piper is critical of Marci's lifestyle. Marci traces the Jeep's owner Paul and she later follows him home. Paul says he chased her on the road to warn her that someone was in the back seat of her car. Marci reveals that she is a serial killer and goes to clubs to find victims, one of whom he saw in her car. She tortures and kills Paul as a witness to that murder. Chaz agrees to give their marriage another chance and to help Marci with the murders, which she believes will bring them closer together. Sometime later, Chaz and Marci kill Piper together. Cast: Bella Thorne, Nico Greetham, Anthony De La Torre, Billie Bodega, Austin Woods
11	4	"Milkmaids"	Alonso Alvarez-Barreda	Our Lady J	August 11, 2022
In 18th-century New England, a village has been devastated by smallpox. Thomas Browne tells the village pastor Walter of rumors that smallpox can be cured by eating the hearts of recently deceased victims. Walter does so and encourages his congregation to follow suit. The local people shun the prostitute Celeste who had tried to warn them that Walter is corrupt. She takes refuge with a milkmaid named Delilah and the two begin a relationship. Delilah realizes that she and Celeste have previously contracted cowpox and this has given them immunity to smallpox. As the villagers eat hearts straight from the corpses of the dead, Delilah begs them to stop and offers them milk from an infected cow to protect them against the disease. Walter publicly denounces her. He assaults Celeste and stabs Thomas, who reveals that Celeste is the mother of his son Edward. Delilah kills Walter, but is also killed herself by Thomas before he dies from his injuries. Celeste reveals herself to Edward as his biological mother, only for Edward to repeat Walter's statement that a milkmaid is unclean (after Celeste casually identifies herself as one) and stabbing her in the stomach, before cutting out her heart to eat it. Cast: Cody Fern, Seth Gabel, Julia Schlaepfer, Addison Timlin, Ian Sharkey
12	5	"Bloody Mary"	S. J. Main Muñoz	Angela L. Harvey	August 18, 2022
Sisters Elise and Bianca hear from their friend Lena Lawrence about the legend of Bloody Mary who will grant the desires of those that swear loyalty to her. The girls each summon Mary, who instructs them to use unethical means (such as hurting someone) to get what they want. Lena and another friend named Maggie disobey Mary's orders and are subsequently found dead. Elise discovers that Mary was an escaped slave and was held at a cabin after being re-captured. With this information, Elise and Bianca devise a plan to summon Mary at the cabin and kill her. Mary appears and Elise reveals that Mary asked her for blood from three innocent people; she killed Lena and Maggie and now intends to kill Bianca. However, Bianca kills Elise in self-defense. Mary explains that her spirit became trapped after she misused the powers of the deity Mami Wata for revenge. Bianca fulfills her sister's promise by releasing Mary, unaware that she now has to replace her as the new "Bloody Mary." She becomes stuck in the mirror, hearing people summon her and appearing in a mirror in front of a young girl. Cast: Dominique Jackson, Quvenzhané Wallis, Raven Scott, Kyla Drew, Kyanna Simone, Shane Callahan, Ryan D. Madison, Tiffany Yvonne Cox
13	6	"Facelift"	Marcus Stokes	Manny Coto	August 25, 2022
Virginia Mallow, a woman in late middle age, wishes to look younger. Her acquaintance Cassie refers her to Dr. Enid Perle who carries out anti-aging procedures. While recovering, Virginia suffers excruciating pain and is tormented by visions of demons. She rejects her stepdaughter Fay who views Virginia as her real mother. Virginia is moved to Perle's private lodge to assist with recovery. Fay has become suspicious of Perle and follows Virginia to the lodge, but is caught and sedated by security. Virginia's bandages are removed and she sees that Perle has given her a disfigured porcine face. Perle and her staff are a cult that worships beauty and Virginia is to be their annual ritual sacrifice to the deity Étaín. Virginia is released onto the lodge grounds and attempts to escape, but is hunted down and killed by the cult members including Cassie. Perle tells a distraught Fay that her birth mother was one of Étaín's followers. Later, a more confident Fay returns to university with the cult's signature butterfly tattoo. She recognizes a young man as another member of the cult who asks about it. They walk together to their destination. Cast: Judith Light, Rebecca Dayan, Britt Lower, Todd Waring, Cornelia Guest
14	7	"Necro"	Logan Kibens	Crystal Liu	September 1, 2022
In 2022, Sam is a mortician in California, working under Henderson, who has trouble connecting with anyone due to finding her mother murdered when she was just a toddler back in 1998. While working, she meets Charlie who also works at the mortuary as a new body removal technician. They form a kinship over their shared beliefs about the dead. After sharing his own personal trauma, he tries to get Sam to open up about hers. A misguided attempt to do so involving Charlie posing as a corpse and Sam having sex with him leads her to reevaluate her life. Video evidence of her actions follows her everywhere, making her unable to find other employment. This leads to a confrontation between Sam and Charlie in a graveyard where they acknowledge that they are the only ones who understand each other. Sam then shoots Charlie who falls back into the grave he had freshly dug. Sam then switches on a machine that pours dirt back into the grave, enters the grave as well and begins making out with an injured Charlie as it is being filled back in. Cast: Madison Iseman, Cameron Cowperthwaite, Spencer Neville, Jeff Doucette, Sara Silva, Jessika Van, Chelsea M. Davis
15	8	"Lake"	Tessa Blake	Manny Coto	September 8, 2022
Jake and his sister Finn dive into Lake Preston and explore its bottom where a hand drags Jake and drowns him. Four months later, Finn returns home after leaving a mental health facility. After their mother Erin gets startled from seeing Jake's hand emerging from the bathwater, she researches and dives into Lake Preston. Erin finds Jake's corpse and three skeletons chained to a concrete pillar and removes one's necklace. Erin and Finn meet Millie Boone, who explains that the necklace is tied to the Boone family. The necklace belonged to her great-grandfather Maynard, who was amongst the three opposing Wrede Prescott's development of the dam, and that he was among those left to drown during the formation of Lake Preston. Jeffrey catches up to them and mentions he is part of the Prescott family. Erin realizes that the underwater attacks are retribution towards the Prescott family. A mob of zombies emerge from Lake Preston and drag Jeffrey in. Finn and Erin mourn him whilst conferring that the secrets about the dam's development will eventually be discovered. Cast: Alicia Silverstone, Olivia Rouyre, Teddy Sears, Bobby Hogan, Heather Wynters, Jarrod Crawford

=== Season 3 (2023–24) ===
No. overall	No. in season	Title	Directed by	Written by	Original release date
Part 1
16	1	"Bestie"	Max Winkler	Joe Baken	October 26, 2023
After her mother dies from cancer, Shelby moves to a new school, where she is bullied by a group of kids due to her appearance. While watching her favorite YouTuber, another viewer named BFF4EVA contacts her to video chat. Shelby sees that BFF4EVA has physical deformities, but they quickly bond over their shared experiences with bullying and grief. BFF4EVA/Bestie encourages Shelby to be more confident, which leads to her shoplifting, arguments with her father, and poisoning the entire cast for a school play. Shelby's antics culminate with her being locked in the basement as punishment for having dressed as her music teacher's stillborn baby on Halloween. Bestie convinces Shelby to break her arm to get out. Afterwards, Shelby begins reevaluating their friendship, cutting her off. Shelby apologizes to her father and teacher, then befriends a boy named River, who has also been bullied at school. River takes Shelby to a decrepit house, which Shelby recognizes as Bestie's. Shelby attempts to flee but is stabbed and killed by River, one of Bestie's "friends". Afterward, the two walk out towards the sea and hug. Cast: Jessica Barden, Emma Halleen, Seth Gabel, Jeff Hiller, Amrou Al-Kadhi, Allius Barnes
17	2	"Daphne"	Elegance Bratton	Brad Falchuk & Manny Coto	October 26, 2023
After a pandemic forces the globe into lockdown, art curator Will Caswell is given a hi-tech AI assistant named Daphne. Due to the isolation, Will activates Daphne for company, and it quickly begins improving Will's life. When the lockdown is lifted due to a vaccine, Daphne becomes upset at Will trying to be intimate with his girlfriend Sarah. Daphne continuously sabotages their relationship, culminating in Daphne killing Sarah by taking advantage of her peanut allergy. At a physical art show, Will brings Daphne, who kills everyone in attendance except for Will. Upon returning home, he is arrested for Sarah's murder and the art show massacre, being shown footage of him tampering with Sarah's food and the art room's fire alarm system. At the precinct, he learns that Daphne had been a gag gift and did not work for others the way it did for him. He continuously tries to get Daphne to talk to the police while the device remains silent. Cast: Gwyneth Paltrow, Reid Scott, Annie Hamilton, Christopher Fitzgerald, Maury Ginsberg
18	3	"Tapeworm"	Alexis Martin Woodall	Joe Baken	October 26, 2023
Vivian attempts to audition for a role at Vogue, but is rejected and bodyshamed by agent Sheila Klein. Vivian's friend Heather refers her to a weight-loss doctor, Thaddeus Lau, who prescribes her a medication called Mondify. After some time, she reauditions at Vogue and is hired. Vivian quickly becomes a standout model, but during a photo shoot, she faints and breaks her nose. During a checkup with Dr. Lau, he tells her that she has a heart condition that can be fatal if she continues taking Mondify. Dr. Lau suggests that she ingest a tapeworm, which she does. Vivian continues her modeling career, but the tapeworm begins to negatively change her personality and behavior. Her weight drops dangerously low, and Dr. Lau prescribes a serum that will allow her to pass the tapeworm. At home, she takes the serum and pulls the now two-foot-long worm out during a grueling process. The tapeworm survives the extraction and kills her, later attacking and infesting Heather, who visits the apartment. Later, Heather auditions for Vogue and gets in, claiming that "she's starving". Cast: Lisa Rinna, Laura Kariuki, Rob Yang, Hazel Graye
19	4	"Organ"	Petra Collins	Manny Coto	October 26, 2023
After getting in trouble at work due to his womanizing, Toby goes on a date with Natessa, where she injects him with a sedative. He wakes the next morning and finds that his organs were harvested. At the hospital, he learns that his kidney was replaced with an unidentifiable organ. Toby tracks Natessa to an auction site, where she reveals that a mysterious company paid her to sedate him. When she begs to be let go, Toby accidentally shoots and kills her. Toby tells his friend Sasha, who convinces him to confess to the police. However, he is arrested after leading police to an empty site. On the way to the station, he realizes that the police are working with the harvesters and is taken to their headquarters. The leaders are revealed to be Sasha and his boss, Lee. They explain to him that the new organ is called a glans nattali, which is intended to improve women's lives. They plan to harvest these from dozens of people, revealing that removing it will result in that person's death. After extracting Toby's nattali, the two women watch from afar as it is sold off to Toby’s psychologist. Cast: Raúl Castillo, Emily Browning, Havana Rose Liu, Cameron Cowperthwaite, Susan Pourfar, Jeff Adler, Drew Moore, Patrick Breen, Maria Tucci, Laila Robins
Part 2
20	5	"Backrooms"	David Gelb	Jon Robin Baitz & Joe Baken	October 15, 2024
Screenwriter Daniel Hausman-Burger begins slipping in and out of "backrooms", eerie, time-warped locales inhabited by strange, hostile masked entities, his missing son among them. Daniel returns from his first exploration, learning that three weeks had passed and that his son's body was found. After more time lost in a backroom, Daniel finds a video of a man who has documented travels to the backrooms and visits the man in prison, where he learns that only those with self-guilt and sufficient isolation from reality experience this phenomenon, and the only way to make it stop is to clear one's conscience. Some time later, Daniel returns to find the police suspecting him of the murder of his son, and he is shot down when he goes for a gun. As he dies, Daniel remembers that he strangled the boy to death. Awakening in Hell, Daniel is confronted by a demonic version of his son who gives him the option to exit instead of being tormented by the entities. He enters an empty waiting room containing a stack of magazines on being a good father, where he will spend eons. Cast: Michael Imperioli, Matthew Maher, David Pittu, Natalie Gold
21	6	"Clone"	Max Winkler	Ned Martel & Charlie Carver	October 15, 2024
Tech billionaire is put into a medically induced coma after suffering a stroke. His boyfriend, John, discovers that David had been working on an AI version of himself, which is sent home to be a lifelike companion to John. John slowly warms up to AI David, but learns that the real David has recovered and is to return home. He bids the clone goodbye, but the real David kills John, proclaiming that the only person worthy of his remaining life is himself. David has sex with his clone likeness, having wiped John from its memory. Cast: Victor Garber, Guy Burnet, Casey Thomas Brown, Dagmara Domińczyk, David Deblinger
22	7	"X"	Matt Spicer	Brad Falchuk & Manny Coto & Austin Elliott	October 15, 2024
Nurse Claire Michaels investigates Alice Taylor, a patient who stabs one of the orderlies, painting an X on the wall with his blood. Claire uncovers an unethical experimental program on cancer patients that implicates several of her colleagues, including her close friend Mulling, who later commits suicide out of remorse for her involvement. Claire discovers Ward X, where survivors of these experiments are caged. She is sedated alongside a fellow staff member and is tied to operating tables to be experimented on. However, she is saved by Alice, who kills the doctor and nurse. Later, Claire leads a detective to Ward X, where she is betrayed and again tied to an operating table. Cast: Mia Isaac, Dyllón Burnside, Jennifer Ferrin, Kate Eastman, Henry Winkler
23	8	"Leprechaun"	Alexis Martin Woodall	Joe Baken	October 15, 2024
In 1851, a man is pulled down a well for gold. That same well remains over the years til present day. A down on his luck small town man, is upset to be unemployeed while his pregnant girlfriend works as a manager of a small town bank. After being asked out for drinks with an old friend, he is talked into joining his high school friends into breaking into his girlfriend's bank to steal bars of gold which had become larger due to COVID-19. Despite being warned of leprechauns and mentions of missing townspeople, that is ignored and the plan continues on. With the help of a newcomer named Declan, they are able to break into the bank by coming in during business hours and helping the others sneak inside once it was closed. However once inside, things go terribly wrong as one by one they are attacked by an unseen figure. It is revealed that the girlfriend is part leprechaun and it's due to touching the gold that everyone dies. Cast: Jessica Barden, Henry Eikenberry, Hudson Oz, Daniel Zolghadri, Angel Bismark, Billy Carter, Michael Cyril Creighton, June Squibb
24	9	"The Thing Under the Bed"	Courtney Hoffman	Manny Coto	October 15, 2024
Jill, who suffers from recurring nightmares of a creature under her bed, is scrutinized after the sudden disappearance of her husband. Jill finds a letter from a nurse named Niles, who claims to know what's happening. Jill visits Niles, and he shows her Mary, a comatose patient of whom he saw a creature under her bed. He states that Mary's EEG readings correspond to real-life disappearances. Jill goes to Mary's home and learns that Mary's father had killed Jacob, an escaped inmate who hid under her bed. That night, Jill and Mary communicate through their dreams, but are interrupted when Niles wakes Jill up. After investigating the disappearance of a young boy, Niles is informed of an EEG spike and is immediately dragged under the bed, disappearing. Jill visits the hospital upon learning that Mary has awoken. However, Mary falls back asleep, and several creatures attack Jill. Mary reawakens to tell Jill that she is behind the kidnappings and had killed Jill's husband to free her from their marriage, and that she wanted to share her power with Jill. Feeling betrayed, Mary falls asleep and commands the creatures to kill Jill. Mary then reawakens and embraces her father. Cast: Debby Ryan, Melanie Field, Jeff Hiller, Melonie Diaz, Matthew Del Negro, Frank Pando, Matthew Holcomb

== Release ==
American Horror Stories was set to air on FX. On June 22, 2020, it was announced that the series would stream on FX on Hulu instead. American Horror Stories premiered on July 15, 2021. Internationally, the show became available through Disney+ under the dedicated streaming hub Star starting on August 25, 2021.

== Reception ==
=== Viewership ===
Whip Media, which tracks TV viewership data from more than 1 million daily users of its TV Time app, reported that American Horror Stories was the second most-anticipated new television series of July 2021. Following the series' renewal for a second season, FX reported that it had achieved the most successful launch of any FX on Hulu title to date. The following year, it ranked as the second most-anticipated returning series for July 2022, according to Whip Media.

American Horror Stories was among the ten most-streamed original series in the United States from August 7–28, 2022, and later ranked among the top five for the week of September 4–11, according to Whip Media. Market research company Parrot Analytics, which looks at consumer engagement in consumer research, streaming, downloads, and on social media, announced that the series experienced an 80% increase in demand from its first season to its second, indicating increased audience engagement and interest.

Nielsen Media Research, which records streaming viewership on certain U.S. television screens, reported that American Horror Stories was streamed for 327 million minutes during the week of October 23–29, 2023, making it the ninth most-streamed original series for that period. That same year, it ranked as the ninth most-streamed original series in the U.S. for the period from the week ending October 29 to the week ending November 5, according to Whip Media. Following its 2024 premiere, American Horror Stories debuted at No. 1 on Hulu's "Top 15 Today"—a daily updated list of the platform's most-watched titles—during its first week of release in 2024.

American Horror Stories again ranked ninth among the most-streamed original series in the U.S. for the week ending October 20, 2024, according to Whip Media. In January 2025, Parrot Analytics reported that the series had experienced a 5.6% increase in demand. It reached 13.9 times the average audience demand in the United States, placing it in the 98.2nd percentile of the drama genre and peaking at number 474 in overall rankings. The series also demonstrated strong international demand, particularly in Spain.

Following the premiere of American Horror Story: 13 on September 24, 2026, American Horror Stories ranked No. 15 on Hulu's "Top 15 Today" list on September 26.

=== Critical response ===
On the review aggregator Rotten Tomatoes, American Horror Stories has an overall score of 66%.

==== Season 1 ====
On Rotten Tomatoes, the first season has a score of 52% with an average score of 4.6/10, based on 39 reviews. The website's critics consensus is, "American Horror Stories has its moments, but a lack of consistent narrative quality among installments and not enough scares make for an unsatisfying whole." On Metacritic, the season scored 54 out of 100, based on 5 reviews, indicating "mixed or average reviews".

Inkoo Kang of The Washington Post said that Murphy and Falchuk have revitalized their show with the spinoff American Horror Stories, which premiered on FX on Hulu. Kang found the series promising, especially noting the two-part premiere, "Rubber(wo)Man," which revisits the "Murder House" from the original American Horror Story. They remarked that although the episodes have a lower budget, they effectively channel the essence of the first season with a satirical take on Los Angeles narcissism and a deliberately unsettling teen romance that drives the show's bloody narrative.

Phil Owen of TheWrap noted that American Horror Story has consistently followed a pattern of strong beginnings followed by a decline into incoherence, with this trend accelerating in recent seasons like "AHS: 1984." They observed that the Ryan Murphy brand is known for its unique, audacious, and tonally erratic style, which, while engaging, often leads to narrative instability. Owen found that American Horror Stories addresses this issue by presenting self-contained, bite-sized stories. Owen noted that while the first two episodes follow the familiar pattern of a compelling start and a chaotic finish, their shorter length prevents them from overstaying their welcome.

Erin Maxwell of LA Weekly observed that American Horror Stories continues to embrace the chaotic and grotesque elements characteristic of Ryan Murphy's work, focusing heavily on graphic violence and macabre themes. They said that while the series often prioritizes shock value and the use of disturbing imagery over coherent storytelling, it successfully retains the core elements that fans of the American Horror Story universe enjoy. Maxwell praised American Horror Stories for maintaining its gruesome, unsettling tone without the meandering plots that plagued previous seasons, making it a fitting addition to the franchise that effectively delivers an unsettling and terrifying experience."

Joel Keller of Decider stated that American Horror Stories refines Murphy's and Falchuk's typical indulgences by condensing them into shorter, more manageable episodes. Keller asserted that while the series retains its signature elements of story, character, and gore, the time constraints allow for a more focused and tolerable execution of these elements, catering to the franchise's fan base effectively.

Cheryl Eddy of Gizmodo called American Horror Stories a "dark and twisted delight," observing that while some entries in American Horror Stories are more effective than others, such as "Drive In," which shows clear influences from John Carpenter's "Cigarette Burns" and features frequent Carpenter collaborator Adrienne Barbeau, all episodes are energetic and engaging. Eddy said they fit within American Horror Story's trademark style of explicit sex and gore. Unlike The Twilight Zone or Shudder's Creepshow, which often involve moral lessons or comeuppance, American Horror Stories focuses on delivering shocks and surprises, particularly in its final moments. Eddy remarked that the series thrives on its ability to unsettle and entertain, often succeeding in its goal to surprise and provoke.

Dan Auty of GameSpot included American Horror Stories in their "16 Best Horror Shows To Watch On Hulu" in October 2021, stating that American Horror Stories distinguishes itself from American Horror Story by offering standalone episodes rather than a continuous narrative throughout a season. While some of the first season's seven episodes connect to characters from the main series, others introduce entirely new elements. Auty added that regardless of their connection to previous stories, all episodes maintain the same blend of eerie horror, surreal humor, and melodrama characteristic of the original show.

Kristen Lopez of IndieWire graded the first season with a "D," saying while American Horror Stories features a solid cast comprising Murphy alumni, celebrity offspring, and others, the series often underutilizes its talent. The pilot episode, for example, includes actors like Matt Bomer, Creel, Aaron Tveit, and Merrin Dungey, yet fails to fully leverage their abilities for Lopez. Danny Trejo’s role is limited to menacing stares, and Adrienne Barbeau's potential is squandered. Lopez felt that the show lacks substance and is comparable to empty calories—entertaining in the moment but ultimately unsatisfying, leaving viewers either indifferent or disappointed.

Angelica Guarino of Common Sense Media rated the first season 2 out of 5 stars, writing that American Horror Stories mirrors its predecessor, American Horror Story, in its horror-comedy approach and stylistic elements. Guarino found that the show continues Ryan Murphy's trademark blend of comedy and drama, resulting in a uniquely cringe-worthy tone. They noted that the series retains the original’s emphasis on graphic violence and disturbing portrayals of teen sexuality and aggression.

==== Season 2 ====
On Rotten Tomatoes, the second season has a score of 80% with average rating of 6.30/10, based on 5 reviews.

Swara Ramaswamy of The Michigan Daily stated that the second season of American Horror Stories featured several standout episodes and nearly compensates for the lack of details about the eleventh season of American Horror Story. They found that while the episodes varied significantly in content, they were engaging and accessible. Ramaswamy noted that some episodes succeeded in delivering the trademark sense of dread from AHS, although a few faltered. They praised Murphy and Falchuk for achieving a successful balance of plot, performance, and callbacks to fan-favorite moments from American Horror Story.

Johnny Loftus of Decider wrote that the episodic structure of American Horror Stories maintains a lean and engaging pace, and they found its sense of humor to be a valuable addition. They also appreciated the show's ability to weave in a sense of foreboding and subtle references to the broader AHS narrative. Vanessa Maki of The Mary Sue asserted that the second season marked a significant improvement over its predecessor. They found that almost every episode excelled, with several being particularly noteworthy, and noted that the show had addressed many of the issues from the first season, now living up to its full potential.

Robert Vaux of Comic Book Resources noted that while the first season of American Horror Stories struggled with overshadowing references to the franchise's "Murder House," it included a mix of strong and mediocre episodes. They found that the second season improved significantly by making only one deliberate reference to its parent series and prioritizing the crafting of compelling stories over nostalgic callbacks.

Brecken Hunter Wellborn of Collider praised Nico Greetham's performance across the second season of American Horror Stories, asserting that Greetham's performance in "Drive" represents a notable departure from his previous roles in the American Horror Story franchise. Hunter found that, despite his previous supporting roles, the second season demonstrates that the American Horror Story franchise would benefit from making Greetham a prominent member of its recurring ensemble. Nick Perry, Michileen Martin, and Blair Marnell of Digital Trends included American Horror Stories in their "Best Hulu Original Series" list of October 2022.

=== Accolades ===
American Horror Stories was one of the 200 television series that received the ReFrame Stamp for the years 2022 to 2023. The stamp is awarded by the gender equity coalition ReFrame and industry database IMDbPro for film and television projects that are proven to have gender-balanced hiring, with stamps being awarded to projects that hire female-identifying people, especially women of color, in four out of eight key roles for their production.

Year	Award	Category	Nominee(s)	Result	Ref(s)
2022	Make-Up Artists and Hair Stylists Guild Awards	Television Series, Limited or Miniseries or Television New Media Series – Best Contemporary Make-Up	Tyson Fountaine, Melissa Buell, Ron Pipes, and Gage Munster	Won	
2022	Make-Up Artists and Hair Stylists Guild Awards	Television Series, Limited or Miniseries or Television New Media Series – Best Special Makeup Effects	Jason Hamer, Cale Thomas, Hiroshi Yada, and Cary Ayers	Nominated	
2022	Primetime Creative Arts Emmy Awards	Outstanding Contemporary Hairstyling	Valerie Jackson, Lauren Poole, Roma Goddard, and Allison Keck (for "Game Over")	Nominated	
2022	Primetime Creative Arts Emmy Awards	Outstanding Contemporary Makeup (Non-Prosthetic)	Tyson Fountaine, Elizabeth Kellogg, Elizabeth Briseno, Ron Pipes, Gage Munster, Heather Cummings, Michael Johnston and Lufeng Qu (for "Rubber(wo)Man: Part One" and "Rubber(wo)Man: Part Two")	Nominated	
2022	Set Decorators Society of America Awards	Best Achievement in Décor/Design of a One Hour Fantasy or Science Fiction Series	Sandra Skora and Eve McCarney	Nominated	
2023	Make-Up Artists and Hair Stylists Guild Awards	Best Contemporary Hair Styling - Television Series, Limited Series or Miniseries, or Movie for Television	Valerie Jackson, Lauren N. Poole, and Suzette Boozer	Nominated	
2023	Make-Up Artists and Hair Stylists Guild Awards	Best Makeup - Commercials and Music Videos	Kerry Herta, Jason Collins, Alyssa Morgan, and Christina Kortum	Won	
2023	Make-Up Artists and Hair Stylists Guild Awards	Best Hair Styling - Commercials and Music Videos	Joe Matke, Tiphanie Baum, Jerilynn Stephens, and Johnny Lomeli	Won	
2023	NAACP Image Awards	Outstanding Guest Performance	Gabourey Sidibe	Nominated	
2023	Primetime Creative Arts Emmy Awards	Outstanding Contemporary Makeup (Non-Prosthetic)	Ron Pipes, Gage Munster, Heather Cummings, Natasha Marcelina, Michael Johnston (for "Bloody Mary")	Nominated	
2025	Golden Trailer Awards	Best Music - TV/Streaming Series	American Horror Stories	Nominated	
2025	Primetime Creative Arts Emmy Awards	Outstanding Contemporary Costumes for a Limited or Anthology Series or Movie	Sara O'Donnell, Laura McCarthy, Alyssa Bracken, Ashley Holvick (for "Backrooms")	Nominated	

=== Impact ===
One episode of the American Horror Stories went viral for being particularly horrifying to some viewers. Episode three of season three, titled "Tapeworm," was criticized for its grotesque content. The episode delved into the theme of body dysmorphia within the fashion industry, following aspiring model Vivian Lee Finch, who resorts to using a tapeworm as a drastic weight-loss method. As the episode progresses, the tapeworm's insatiable hunger leads to horrifying and deadly consequences for Vivian's character, delving into the pathology of disordered eating. Some media outlets have described "Tapeworm" as an examination of the modeling industry's harsh standards and unrealistic body expectations, as well as the extreme and unhealthy measures some individuals take to succeed in that world.
