= Tyson Bidner =

Film and television producer

- Born: August 4, 1974 (age 52)
- Occupations: Film producer; Unit production manager; Location manager
- Spouse: Allison Bidner
- Children: Shoshana Bidner, Talia Bidner, Micah Bidner, and Ava Bidner

Tyson Bidner is an Emmy award winning film and television producer based in New York.

== Education ==
Bidner attended Sir Robert Borden High School, the same high school as actor Sandra Oh. He graduated from the New York University Stern School of Business in 1997.

== Career ==
Bidner is best known for his work on The Bear, which was awarded a Primetime Emmy and Producers Guild of America (PGA) award. Bidner is also known for his work on The Whale, Severance, American Sports Story, and Ramy. Bidner is also credited with finding the location for Carrie Bradshaw's apartment in Sex and the City Bidner is an executive producer on the prequel to Friday the 13th; titled Crystal Lake.

Bidner is the Vice-Chair of the Producers Guild of America’s Eastern region steering committee

Bidner has worked alongside some of the film industry’s most acclaimed directors, including Joss Whedon (The Avengers), Joel and Ethan Coen (Inside Llewyn Davis, True Grit, A Serious Man), and Sam Mendes (Away We Go).

== Personal life ==
Bidner has four children and is married to Allison Bidner. The family resides on Long Island in New York.

== Filmography ==
=== Film ===
Year	Title	Role
2009	A Serious Man	Location manager
2009	Away We Go	Location manager
2009	Did You Hear About the Morgans?	Location manager
2010	True Grit	Supervising location manager
2011	Captain America: The First Avenger	Location manager: New York
2011	Paradise Kiss	Location manager: New York
2012	The Avengers	Location manager: New York unit
2013	Inside Llewyn Davis	Location manager
2014	Annie	Location manager
2019	The Whale	Executive producer; unit production manager
2023	Mustache	Producer
2024	Loser	Producer
2025	Bury Me Home	Executive producer
2025	F*ckUps Anonymous	Executive producer
2026	Love Language	Executive producer
TBA	The Lincoln Highway	Producer

=== Television ===
Year	Title	Role
2009–2011	White Collar	Location manager
2013–2014	The Michael J. Fox Show	Location manager
2015–2018	The Americans	Unit production manager; co-producer; producer
2016	Falling Water	Unit production manager
2017	Iron Fist	Unit production manager
2018	The Looming Tower	Unit production manager
2019	Succession	Unit production manager
2019–2022	Ramy	Producer; executive producer
2020	Katy Keene	Unit production manager
2021–2022	Bridge and Tunnel	Consulting producer
2022	Mo	Co-executive producer
2022–2025	The Bear	Producer; executive producer; unit production manager
2024	American Sports Story	Producer
2025	Severance	Producer
2026	Best Medicine	Executive producer
2026	Crystal Lake	Executive producer

== Awards and nominations ==
Year	Series	Title	Result	Notes
2023	The Bear	Outstanding Comedy Series, Primetime Emmy Awards	Won	Credited as "Produced by"
2023	The Bear	Peabody Award for Entertainment	Won	Credited as Associate Producer
2023	The Bear	Danny Thomas Award for Outstanding Producer of Episodic Television, Comedy	Won	Credited as Producer
2024	The Bear	Danny Thomas Award for Outstanding Producer of Episodic Television, Comedy	Won	Credited as Producer
2024	The Bear	Outstanding Comedy Series, Primetime Emmy Awards	Nominated	Credited as "Produced by"
2024	The Bear	International	Nominated	Credited as producer
2025	The Bear	Outstanding Directorial Achievement in Comedy Series	Nominated	For the episode "Napkins"; credited as Unit Production Manager
2025	The Bear	Outstanding Directorial Achievement in Comedy Series	Nominated	For the episode "Doors"; credited as Unit Production Manager
2025	The Bear	Outstanding Directorial Achievement in Comedy Series	Nominated	For the episode "Tomorrow"; credited as Unit Production Manager
2025	The Bear	Outstanding Comedy Series, Primetime Emmy Awards	Nominated	Credited as Executive Producer
2026	The Bear	International	Nominated	Credited as producer
2026	The Bear	Outstanding Directorial Achievement in Comedy Series	Nominated	For the episode "Worms"; credited as Unit Production Manager
2026	The Bear	Outstanding Directorial Achievement in Comedy Series	Nominated	For the episode "Bears"; credited as Unit Production Manager
2026	The Bear	Danny Thomas Award for Outstanding Producer of Episodic Television, Comedy	Nominated	Credited as Producer
