= K-Ville (TV series) =

American television series

- Genre: Crime drama
- Created by: Jonathan Lisco
- Starring: Anthony Anderson; Cole Hauser; Tawny Cypress; John Carroll Lynch; Blake Shields; Maximiliano Hernandez; Blake Nelson Boyd
- Opening theme: "Comin' Back" by Dr. John
- Composer: Philip Giffin
- Country of origin: United States
- Original language: English
- No. of seasons: 1
- No. of episodes: 11 (1 unaired)

Production
- Executive producers: Jonathan Lisco; Craig Silverstein
- Producers: Kelly A. Manners; Skip Schoolnik
- Production locations: New Orleans, Louisiana
- Running time: 60 minutes
- Production companies: Lockjaw Productions; 20th Century Fox Television

Original release
- Network: Fox
- Release: September 17 – December 17, 2007

K-Ville (an abbreviation of Katrinaville) is an American crime drama television series that aired from September 17 to December 17, 2007, on Fox, created by executive producer Jonathan Lisco, centering on policing New Orleans after Hurricane Katrina. Deran Sarafian directed the pilot.

On May 15, 2008, the series was canceled.

== Production notes ==
The pilot episode was written by Lisco (who also served as executive producer), directed by Deran Sarafian, and stars Anthony Anderson as Marlin Boulet and Cole Hauser as Trevor Cobb, partners who "have conflicting ideas about how to handle the city's problems." The pilot also features John Carroll Lynch, Tawny Cypress and Blake Shields.

The first episode featured a 1970 Pontiac Catalina as the getaway car early in the show.

The show had permission to use the official New Orleans Police Department logos, particularly the unique "star and crescent" badge design, and was filmed on location in the city in March and April 2007. According to the NOPD's public integrity bureau, the production emphasizes the "good work that the men and the women of the Police Department performed [after Katrina], which was not portrayed by much of the media."

Lisco, a former lawyer who has previously written scripts for The District and NYPD Blue, did several ride-alongs with the New Orleans Police Department before writing a script for the pilot. It was during one such ride-along that he spotted some graffiti sporting the shorthand for "Katrinaville" that became the show's title.

In order to promote the series, Fox made the pilot episode available for streaming on a number of television media websites on August 22, 2007.

Due to the Writers Guild of America strike, K-Ville shut down production, and only 11 of the 13 episodes were produced. The show did not appear on Fox's midseason schedule.

== Cast and characters ==
- Anthony Anderson as Marlin Boulet
- Cole Hauser as Trevor Cobb
- Tawny Cypress as Ginger "Love Tap" LeBeau
- Blake Shields as Jeff "Glue Boy" Gooden
- John Carroll Lynch as Capt. James Embry
- Maximiliano Hernandez as Billy "K-9" Faust

== Broadcast history ==
Produced by 20th Century Fox Television, the series was officially greenlit and given a thirteen-episode order on May 11, 2007. It premiered on September 17, 2007, on Fox, and was also broadcast by Fox8 and Channel Ten in Australia, E! in Canada and Five USA in the UK.

== Episodes ==
No.	Title	Directed by	Written by	Original release date	Prod. code
1	"Pilot"	Deran Sarafian	Jonathan Lisco	September 17, 2007	1ANM79
Cobb and Boulet are on the hunt for the killer of Marlin's neighbor, who was shot and killed at a local charity fundraiser.
2	"Cobb's Webb"	Bryan Spicer	Craig Silverstein	September 24, 2007	1ANM02
Marlin Boulet and Trevor Cobb are on the trail of some escapee convicts from a New Orleans Jail. The manhunt turns out to be more involved than just a simple jail break. Just when they think they get a valid lead, they are thrown a curve ball by someone, or something.
3	"Bedfellows"	Craig Ross Jr.	Lawrence Kaplow & Wendy West	October 1, 2007	1ANM04
When a city councilman is murdered Boulet and Cobb's investigation leads them into the underworld of political corruption and the sex trade. They find that Captain Embry has a dangerous friendship with a prostitute but he proves his integrity in the end.
4	"No Good Deed"	Kevin Dowling	John Eisendrath	October 8, 2007	1ANM03
Cobb and Boulet try to solve a woman's murder involving a twist of voodoo magic and a jealous ex-husband. Part of Cobb's past surfaces.
5	"Critical Mass"	Steven DePaul	Jonathan Lisco & Craig Silverstein	October 22, 2007	1ANM06
Many mysteries of Boulet's past are revealed when a murder occurs at his old family church during Sunday mass.
6	"AKA"	Terrence O'Hara	Chris Black & Bruce Zimmerman	November 12, 2007	1ANM07
When Cobb, Boulet, Love Tap and Glue Boy arrive at a bloody crime scene, Cobb cannot believe what he sees. As a result of Cobb's reaction, the criminal attempts to escape and severely injures Glue Boy.
7	"Melissa"	Marita Grabiak	Alex Berger & Craig Silverstein	November 19, 2007	1ANM08
When a plastic surgeon is found dead in what looks like a transaction gone bad, the unlikely NOPD cop team of Boulet and Cobb begin unfolding the layers of this mysterious crime.
8	"Flood, Wind, and Fire"	Félix Enríquez Alcalá	Chris Black & Bruce Zimmerman	December 3, 2007	1ANM09
Things heat up when Boulet and Cobb uncover details surrounding the murder of an insurance adjuster whose toothless body is found in one of New Orleans' flooded areas.
9	"Boulet in a China Shop"	Brad Turner	Jonathan Lisco & Bruce Zimmerman	December 10, 2007	1ANM01
While Boulet and other members of the NOPD are reveling at a karaoke bar in the French Quarter, the night takes an unsuspecting turn when they get a call about a crime at a high-profile merchant. It is discovered that a vicious criminal is racketeering local businesses. Meanwhile, resolve and trust limits are tested between the unlikely cop duo of Boulet and Cobb.
10	"Ride Along"	Tucker Gates	Wendy West	December 17, 2007	1ANM10
When a reporter from New York visits New Orleans to write a story on the city two years after Katrina, Cobb and Boulet begrudgingly take her on a ride-along. While escorting their guest, Boulet and Cobb respond to a call where a victim has been brutally shot. As the investigation unfolds and the journalist reports, challenging and unforeseen circumstances surface.
11	"Game Night"	Dermott Downs	Alex Berger & Ahmed Lavalais	Unaired	1ANM05
On the eve of the college football National Championship, Boulet and Cobb are assigned to a special protection detail guarding native son and star running back Vin Baer. While this promising prospect should be gearing up for a monumental game at the Superdome, troubling events could bench him.

== U.S. Nielsen weekly ratings ==
#	Episode	Rating	Share	18–49 (Rating/Share)	Viewers (m)
1	"Pilot"	5.7	9	3.4/8	8.96
2	"Cobb's Webb"	4.1	6	3.1/8	7.28
3	"Bedfellows"	3.7	5	2.3/5	6.13
4	"No Good Deeds"	3.4	5	2.0/5	5.38
5	"Critical Mass"	4.2	6	2.1/5	6.12
6	"AKA"	3.3	5	1.6/4	4.72
7	"Melissa"	3.2	5	1.4/3	4.70
8	"Flood, Wind, and Fire"	3.3	5	1.5/3	4.82
9	"Boulet in a China Shop"	3.5	5	1.5/4	5.13
10	"Ride Along"	3.5	5	1.6/4	5.34
