= Maniac Cop III: Badge of Silence =

- DVD cover
- Directed by: William Lustig (Note: Credited as Alan Smithee.)
- Written by: Larry Cohen
- Produced by: Joel Soisson; Michael Leahy
- Starring: Robert Davi; Caitlin Dulany; Gretchen Becker; Paul Gleason; Doug Savant; Robert Z'Dar
- Cinematography: Jacques Haitkin
- Edited by: Rick Tuber; David Kern; Michael Eliot
- Music by: Joel Goldsmith
- Production companies: First Look Studios; NEO Motion Pictures
- Distributed by: HBO; Academy Home Entertainment
- Release date: July 7, 1993 (United States)
- Running time: 85 minutes
- Country: United States
- Language: English

Maniac Cop III: Badge of Silence is a 1993 American slasher film written by Larry Cohen and directed by William Lustig under the name Alan Smithee. It serves as a sequel to Maniac Cop 2 (1990) and is the third installment in the Maniac Cop film series.

Maniac Cop III: Badge of Silence was released in the United States on videocassette on July 7, 1993 to negative reviews.

== Plot ==
A Voodoo priest named Houngan resurrects Matt Cordell, who takes his badge and comes back to life to do his bidding. Meanwhile, a pair of reporters who are hoping to make it big come across a convenience store robbery, where a police officer named Katie Sullivan intervenes in a hostage situation; she manages to wound suspect Frank Jessup but realizes that the clerk is his girlfriend, and she had intentionally let him in to rob the store. There is a crossfire, and while Katie is severely wounded, she ends up killing the clerk in return.

Though rushed to the hospital, Katie is declared comatose and brain dead, much to the chagrin of investigating officer Sean McKinney. McKinney catches a report from the two reporters of Katie using excessive force in a hostage situation, which portrays the clerk as an innocent victim and threatens to free the badly injured Jessup.

Meanwhile, stalking Katie's progress, Cordell goes to the hospital to watch her (killing a heckler in the process). He kills one of her supervising physicians with defibrillator paddles, then murders Katie's physician with X-ray radiation. The two reporters who had framed Katie are also slain by Cordell afterwards.

Meanwhile, McKinney and a physician, Susan, are investigating the murders and the strange behavior experienced by the comatose Katie. Their investigations lead them to Houngan, who admits that he had brought Cordell back from the dead, and he is interested in Katie, who is on the verge of death. At gunpoint, Cordell forces Houngan to attempt the resurrection on her, revealing Katie to have been his lover when he was alive. However, Houngan is unable to do so, stating her spirit is refusing to return from the dead to be with him. Cordell kills Houngan, and both he and Katie are set on fire in the process; she is immolated.

As they escape, Susan and McKinney are chased by Cordell, who survived the fire while remaining ablaze. He chases them in a beat-up police car while they ride in an ambulance. They manage to throw an oxygen tank into the burning car before both crash. However, before Cordell can back up on the other disabled vehicle, the canister goes off, blowing up the car. Later, the charred corpse of Katie is rolled into a morgue, next to the burned remains of Cordell. While the lone coroner, who rolled Katie into the morgue, is busy with his computer, the camera pans to the bodies, which shows Cordell's hand moving over to hold Katie's hand. The coroner soon notices and it cuts to black.

== Cast ==
- Robert Z'Dar as Officer Matt Cordell / The Maniac Cop
- Robert Davi as Lieutenant Sean McKinney
- Caitlin Dulany as Dr. Susan Fowler
- Gretchen Becker as Officer Katie Sullivan
- Paul Gleason as Hank Cooney
- Jackie Earle Haley as Frank Jessup
- Julius Harris as Houngan Malfaiteur
- Grand L. Bush as William
- Doug Savant as Dr. Peter Myerson
- Robert Forster as Dr. Powell
- Bobby Di Cicco as Bishop
- Frank Pesce as Tribble
- Lou Diaz as Lieutenant Leon
- Brenda Varda as Gina Lindsey
- Vanessa Marquez as Terry
- Jeffrey Anderson-Gunter as The Janitor
- Jophery Brown as Degrazia
- Vinnie Curto as Kenyon

== Production ==
The original script featured a Black detective investigating a series of murders in a hospital in Harlem, New York. As the film was already in pre-production, and Lustig had started scouting location and casting actors, the pre-sale to Japan had not come through. According to Lustig, the Japanese distributor did not want a Black lead in the film, and sought Robert Davi instead. Lustig pleaded against it, but eventually Davi was cast. They had a script that did not make sense, according to Lustig in a 2019 interview. Larry Cohen refused to rewrite the script, unless he was paid for the additional work. The producers declined to pay him. As a result, Lustig had to improvise and cut scenes from the script. In Lustig's words: "We got to a point where we shot all the scenes we could shoot, after cutting all the other stuff out of the script, and it came out to be like an hour long movie. So they had to go out and shoot scenes that were just filler". At that point, Lustig walked away from the film. The film is credited to Alan Smithee.

== Release ==
=== Home media ===
Maniac Cop III was rated NC-17 by the Motion Picture Association of America and upheld on appeal. It was released on home video in the United States by Academy Releasing. It premiered on HBO in 1992.

Blue Underground released Maniac Cop III on DVD and Blu-ray on November 19, 2013. 4k released by Blue Underground in 2021

== Reception ==
A reviewer for TV Guide awarded Maniac Cop III a score of two out of four stars, writing: "After ascending to heights unusual for a modern B movie in Maniac Cop 2, the series drops back a couple of notches with this latest entry, which seems at a loss to find new things for its horrific antihero to do".

DVD Talk's Adam Tyner, who gave Maniac Cop III an overall score of one-and-a-half out of five stars, called it "borderline unwatchable", lamenting its pacing and dialogue and asserting that "nothing about the movie works". Patrick Naugle of DVD Verdict said the cast was decent, and that while the plot was disjointed and overall the film was forgettable and "just not very good" it was still "an alright time filler" that was "worth checking out, if you're a big horror buff". Michael Gingold of Fangoria rated it two out four stars and criticized the lack of emphasis on the film's antagonist. Anthony Arrigo of Dread Central gave it a score of two-and-a-half out of five stars, calling it a disappointing sequel that "only manages to stay above water thanks to a powerhouse performance from Robert Davi". Bloody Disgusting's Mike Pereira gave it three out of five stars, writing: "It's definitely the weakest of the bunch yet still delivers the qualities that have made the franchise sustain its cult following".
