= Closing Night (film) =

American drama film

- Directed by: Cody Fern
- Screenplay by: Cody Fern; Devon Bostick
- Produced by: Nancy Grant; Rosalie Chicoine Perreault; Will Howarth; Matilda Comers
- Starring: Sarah Paulson; Naomi Watts; Dianne Wiest; Toby Wallace; Odessa A'zion
- Cinematography: Yves Bélanger
- Edited by: Dany Cooper
- Music by: Mathieu David Gagnon
- Production companies: Metafilms; Fictious
- Distributed by: Elevation Pictures
- Release date: September 12, 2026 (TIFF)
- Running time: 115 minutes
- Countries: Australia; Canada
- Language: English

Closing Night is a 2026 drama film starring Sarah Paulson and Naomi Watts. It is the feature length directorial debut of Cody Fern. It premiered at the 2026 Toronto International Film Festival.

== Plot ==
The film follows a hardened and celebrated movie star (Paulson) who invites her estranged family to the opening night of her Broadway play. Old wounds resurface after decades of no contact, reuniting the main character with her resentful sister (Watts) and nephew (Wallace).

== Cast ==
- Sarah Paulson as Sandra Vale
- Naomi Watts as April Donaldson
- Dianne Wiest as Diane
- Toby Wallace as Theo
- Odessa A'zion as Lucy

== Production ==
The film is co-written by Cody Fern and Devon Bostick, with Fern as director in his feature length directorial debut.

In May 2025, Sarah Paulson, Toni Collette, Dianne Wiest, and Toby Wallace joined the cast. Naomi Watts and Odessa A'zion joined the cast in February 2026, with principal photography taking place in Montreal that month.

== Reception ==
On review aggregator Rotten Tomatoes, the film holds an approval rating of 67% based on 15 reviews, with an average rating of 5.6/10. Metacritic, which uses a weighted average, assigned the film a score of 46 out of 100, based on 8 critics, indicating "mixed or average reviews".
