= British Academy Television Award for Best International Programme =

Annual UK television award

British Academy Television Award
- Awarded for: Award for best non-British programme
- Country: United Kingdom
- Presented by: British Academy of Film and Television Arts
- First award: 2007
- Currently held by: The Studio (2026)
- Website: http://www.bafta.org/

The British Academy Television Award for Best International Programme, or BAFTA TV Award for Best International, is an award presented by the British Academy of Film and Television Arts, according to BAFTA the category is for "a single programme or series of any genre acquired from the international marketplace".

== History ==
From 1964 to 1998 the category was awarded individually and not all years as Best Foreign Television Programme, after 1999 it started having a set of nominees and a winner under the name of Best International Programme.

== Winners and nominees ==
=== 1960s ===
| Year | Title | Recipient(s) |
|---|---|---|
| 1964 | L'Aiguille Du Midi | Alexandre Tarta |
| 1965 | President Kennedy's Funeral | |
| 1966 | Living Camera | Robert Drew Associates |
| 1967 | Not awarded | |
| 1968 | The Anderson Platoon | Pierre Schoendoerffer |
| 1969 | Czechoslovak Television Service | |

=== 1970s ===
| Year | Title | Recipient(s) |
|---|---|---|
| 1970 | The First Television Pictures From The Moon | Neil Armstrong and Everyone Associated |
| 1971 | Not awarded | |
| 1972 | The Sorrow and the Pity | Marcel Ophuls |
| 1973 | Deutsches Olympisches Zentrum (Munich Olympic Games) | |
| 1974 | Not awarded | |
| 1975 | Not awarded | |
| 1976 | The Magic Flute | Ingmar Bergman |
| 1977 | Edvard Munch | Peter Watkins |

=== 1980s ===
| Year | Title | Recipient(s) | |
|---|---|---|---|
| 1983 | Sweden: The Miracle of Life | Lennart Nilsson | |
| 1984 | Not awarded | | |
| 1985 | Das Boot | | Wolfgang Petersen |
| 1986 | Not awarded | | |
| 1987 | Heimat | Edgar Reitz | |
| 1988 | Lowest of the Low (Ganz Unten) | Günter Walraff, Joerg Gfrörer | |
| 1989 | Tanner | Robert Altman | |

=== 1990s ===
| Year | Title | Recipient(s) |
|---|---|---|
| 1990 | Hotel Terminus | |
| 1991 | The Ten Commandments | Krzysztof Kieślowski |
| 1992 | The Civil War | Ken Burns, Hugh Purcell |
| 1993 | Tosca | Andrea Andermann, Brian Large |
| 1994 | The Oprah Winfrey Show | |
| 1995 | NYPD Blue | |
| 1996 | ER | |
| 1997 | Murder One | |
| 1998 | Friends | |
| 1999 | The Larry Sanders Show | Garry Shandling, Dennis Klein |
| 1999 | Ally McBeal | David E. Kelley |
| 1999 | The Simpsons | Matt Groening |
| 1999 | The X-Files | Chris Carter |

=== 2000s ===
| Year | Series | Producers | Broadcaster |
|---|---|---|---|
| 2007 | Entourage | Doug Ellin, Mark Wahlberg, Steve Levinson | ITV2 |
| 2007 | House | David Shore | Five |
| 2007 | Lost | J. J. Abrams, Carlton Cuse, Damon Lindelof, Jack Bender | Channel 4 |
| 2007 | My Name Is Earl | Greg Garcia, Marc Buckland, Bobby Bowman | Channel 4 |
| 2008 | Heroes | Tim Kring, Joe Pokaski, Paul Edwards, Dennis Hammer | BBC Two |
| 2008 | Californication | Tom Kapinos, David Duchovny, Scott Winant | Five |
| 2008 | Family Guy | Seth MacFarlane, David A Goodman, Chris Sheridan, Danny Smith | BBC Three |
| 2008 | My Name Is Earl | Greg Garcia, Bobby Bowman, Henry Lange Jr, Marc Buckland | E4 |
| 2009 | Mad Men | Matthew Weiner, Scott Hornbacher | BBC Four |
| 2009 | The Daily Show With Jon Stewart | Chuck O'Neil, Rich Blomquist, Scott Jacobson, Jon Stewart | More4 |
| 2009 | Dexter | John Goldwyn, Sara Colleton, Clyde Philips, Robert Lloyd Lewis | ITV1 |
| 2009 | The Wire | David Simon, Ed Burns, Nina K. Noble, Joe Chappelle | BBC Two |

=== 2010s ===
| Year | Series | Producers | Broadcaster |
|---|---|---|---|
| 2010 | Mad Men | Matthew Weiner, Scott Hornbacher | BBC Four |
| 2010 | Family Guy | Seth MacFarlane | BBC Three |
| 2010 | Nurse Jackie | Evan Dunsky, Liz Brixius, Linda Wallem, Richie Jackson | BBC2 |
| 2010 | True Blood | Alan Ball, Brian Buckner | FXUK |
| 2011 | The Killing | Søren Sveistrup, Piv Bernth, Birger Larsen, Sofie Gråbøl | BBC Four |
| 2011 | Boardwalk Empire | Martin Scorsese, Terence Winter, Tim Van Patten, Howard Korder | Sky Atlantic |
| 2011 | Glee | Ian Brennan, Ryan Murphy, Brad Falchuk | E4 |
| 2011 | Mad Men | Matthew Weiner, Scott Hornbacher, Jennifer Getzinger | BBC Four |
| 2012 | Borgen | Jeppe Gjervig Gram, Camilla Hammerich, Tobias Lindholm, Adam Price | BBC Four |
| 2012 | The Killing | Piv Bernth, Sofie Grabol, Kristoffer Nyholm, Soren Sveistrup | BBC Four |
| 2012 | Modern Family | Steve Levitan, Christopher Lloyd | Sky One |
| 2012 | The Slap | Tony Ayres, Helen Bowden, Michael McMahon | BBC Four |
| 2013 | Girls | Lena Dunham, Jenni Konner, Judd Apatow | Sky Atlantic |
| 2013 | The Bridge | Hans Rosenfeldt, Charlotte Sieling, Anders Landstrom, Bo Ehrhardt | BBC Four |
| 2013 | Game of Thrones | David Benioff, D. B. Weiss, Carolyn Strauss, Frank Doelger | Sky Atlantic |
| 2013 | Homeland | Alex Gansa, Howard Gordon, Michael Cuesta, Gideon Raff | Channel 4 |
| 2014 | Breaking Bad | Vince Gilligan, Mark Johnson, George Mastras, Sam Catlin | Netflix |
| 2014 | House of Cards | Beau Willimon, David Fincher, Joshua Donen, Kevin Spacey | Netflix |
| 2014 | Borgen | Adam Price, Tobias Lindholm, Jannik Johansen, Camilla Hammerich | BBC Four |
| 2014 | The Returned | Caroline Benjo, Fabrice Gobert, Monica Levy, Jimmy Desmarais | Channel 4 |
| 2015 | True Detective | Nic Pizzolatto, Cary Joji Fukunaga, Scott Stephens, Steve Golin | Sky Atlantic |
| 2015 | House of Cards | Beau Willimon, David Fincher, Joshua Donen, Kevin Spacey | Netflix |
| 2015 | Orange is the New Black | Jenji Kohan, Lisa I. Vinnecour, Sara Hess, Sian Heder | Netflix |
| 2015 | The Good Wife | Michelle King, Robert King | More4 |
| 2016 | Transparent | Joey Soloway, Andrea Sperling, Victor Hsu, Bridget Bedard | Amazon Prime Video |
| 2016 | Spiral | Vassili Clert, Anne Landois | BBC Four |
| 2016 | Narcos | José Padilha, Eric Newman, Chris Brancato | Netflix |
| 2016 | The Good Wife | Michelle King, Robert King | More4 |
| 2017 | The People v. O. J. Simpson: American Crime Story | Ryan Murphy, Nina Jacobson, Brad Simpson | BBC Two |
| 2017 | The Night Of | Steven Zaillian, Richard Price, Jane Tranter | Sky Atlantic |
| 2017 | Stranger Things | Matt Duffer, Ross Duffer, Shawn Levy, Dan Cohen | Netflix |
| 2017 | Transparent | Joey Soloway, Andrea Sperling, Victor Hsu, Bridget Bedard | Amazon Prime Video |
| 2018 | The Handmaid's Tale | Bruce Miller, Warren Littlefield, Kari Skogland | Channel 4 |
| 2018 | Big Little Lies | Reese Witherspoon, Nicole Kidman, Bruna Papandrea, Per Saari | Sky Atlantic |
| 2018 | Feud: Bette and Joan | Ryan Murphy, Dede Gardner, Tim Minear, Alexis Martin Woodall | BBC Two |
| 2018 | The Vietnam War | Ken Burns, Lynn Novick, Geoffrey C. Ward, Sarah Botstein | BBC Four |
| 2019 | Succession | Jesse Armstrong, Will Ferrell, Adam McKay | Sky Atlantic |
| 2019 | 54 Hours : The Gladbeck Hostage Crisis | Regina Ziegler, Kilian Riedhof, Holger Karsten Schmidt | BBC Four |
| 2019 | The Handmaid's Tale | Bruce Miller, Warren Littlefield, Elisabeth Moss, Mike Barker | Channel 4 |
| 2019 | Storyville: "Reporting Trump's First Year: The Fourth Estate" | Liz Garbus, Jenny Carchman, Justin Wilkes, Dan Cogan | BBC Two |

=== 2020s ===
| Year | Series | Producers | Broadcaster |
|---|---|---|---|
| 2020 | When They See Us | Ava DuVernay, Jonathan King, Jane Rosenthal, Berry Welsh | Netflix |
| 2020 | Euphoria | Sam Levinson, Ravi Nandan, Kevin Turen, Drake | Sky Atlantic |
| 2020 | Succession | Jesse Armstrong, Will Ferrell, Adam McKay | Sky Atlantic |
| 2020 | Unbelievable | Susannah Grant, Sarah Timberman, Lisa Cholodenko | Netflix |
| 2021 | Storyville: "Welcome to Chechnya: The Gay Purge" | David France, Alice Henty, Askold Kurov, Joy A. Tomchin | BBC Four |
| 2021 | Little America | Lee Eisenberg, Alan Yang, Kumail Nanjiani, Emily V. Gordon | Apple TV+ |
| 2021 | Lovecraft Country | | Sky Atlantic |
| 2021 | Unorthodox | Anna Winger, Alexa Karolinski, Maria Schrader | Netflix |
| 2022 | The Underground Railroad | Barry Jenkins, Colson Whitehead, Adele Romanski, Mark Ceryak, Dede Gardner, Jeremy Kleiner | Amazon Prime |
| 2022 | Succession | | HBO/Sky Atlantic |
| 2022 | Mare of Easttown | | HBO/Sky Atlantic |
| 2022 | Call My Agent! | Harold Valentin, Aurélien Larger, Dominique Besnehard, Michel Feller | Netflix |
| 2022 | Lupin | | Netflix |
| 2022 | Squid Game | Hwang Dong-hyuk, Kim Ji-Yeon | Netflix |
| 2023 | Dahmer – Monster: The Jeffrey Dahmer Story | | Netflix |
| 2023 | The Bear | Christopher Storer, Joanna Calo, Josh Senior, Hiro Murai | Disney+ |
| 2023 | Oussekine | Anthony Lancret, Pierre Laugier, Juliette Lassalle, Antoine Chevrollier, Pauline Dauvin, Kevin Deysson | Disney+ |
| 2023 | Wednesday | | Netflix |
| 2023 | Pachinko | Soo Hugh, Michael Ellenberg, Lindsey Springer, Theresa Kang, Richard Middleton, Kogonada | Apple TV+ |
| 2023 | The White Lotus | Mike White, David Bernad, Mark Kamine, John Valerio, Heather Persons | Sky Atlantic |
| 2024 | Class Act | Bruno Nahon, Tristan Séguela, Olivier Demangel, Laurent Lafitte | Netflix |
| 2024 | The Bear | Christopher Storer, Joanna Calo, Josh Senior, Matty Matheson, Tyson Bidner | Disney+ |
| 2024 | Beef | Lee Sung Jin, Steven Yeun, Ali Wong, Jake Schreier, Ravi Nandan, Alli Reich | Netflix |
| 2024 | The Last of Us | | HBO / Sky Atlantic |
| 2024 | Succession | | HBO / Sky Atlantic |
| 2024 | Love & Death | | ITVX |
| 2025 | Shōgun | Justin Marks, Rachel Kondo, Michaela Clavell, Jonathan van Tulleken, Eriko Miyagawa, Hiroyuki Sanada | Disney+ |
| 2025 | Colin from Accounts | | BBC Two |
| 2025 | Say Nothing | Nina Jacobson, Brad Simpson, Joshua Zetumer, Patrick Keefe, Monica Levinson, Michael Lennox | Disney+ |
| 2025 | After the Party | Helen Bowden, Dianne Taylor, Robyn Malcolm, Peter Salmon, Liz DiFiore, Jason Stephens | Channel 4 |
| 2025 | True Detective: Night Country | | Sky Atlantic |
| 2025 | You Are Not Alone: Fighting the Wolfpack | Almudena Carracedo, Robert Bahar, Katie Bryer, Samuel R. Santana | Netflix |
| 2026 | The Studio | Seth Rogen, Evan Goldberg, Alex Gregory, Peter Huyck, Frida Perez, James Weaver | Apple TV |
| 2026 | The Bear | Christopher Storer, Joanna Calo, Josh Senior, Tyson Bidner, Matty Matheson, Cooper Wehde | Disney+ |
| 2026 | The Diplomat | Debora Cahn, Janice Williams, Alex Graves, Keri Russell, Melissa Gelernter, Pam Roberts | Netflix |
| 2026 | Pluribus | | Apple TV |
| 2026 | Severance | | Apple TV |
| 2026 | The White Lotus | Mike White, Mark Kamine, David Bernad | Sky Atlantic |

== Programmes with multiple wins and nominations ==
=== Multiple Awards ===
2 awards

- Mad Men

=== Multiple Nominations ===
4 nominations

- Succession

3 nominations

- The Bear
- Mad Men

2 nominations

- Borgen
- Family Guy
- The Handmaid's Tale
- House of Cards
- My Name is Earl
- The Good Wife
- The Killing
- Transparent
- The White Lotus
