= New Port South =

2001 film by Kyle Cooper

- Theatrical release poster
- Directed by: Kyle Cooper
- Written by: James Hughes
- Produced by: Billy Higgins
- Starring: Todd Field; Will Estes; Melissa George; Blake Shields
- Cinematography: Juan Ruiz Anchía
- Edited by: Lawrence Jordan
- Music by: Telefon Tel Aviv
- Production companies: Touchstone Pictures; Hughes Entertainment
- Distributed by: Buena Vista Pictures Distribution
- Release date: September 7, 2001
- Running time: 95 minutes
- Country: United States
- Language: English

New Port South is a 2001 American drama film. It was released on September 7, 2001. The film is set in the fictional town of New Port, near Chicago. It stars Will Estes, Todd Field, Melissa George and Blake Shields, was written by James Hughes and directed by Kyle Cooper. The soundtrack is by Telefon Tel Aviv.

James Hughes is the son of John Hughes, who also served as executive producer for the movie.

== Plot ==
Will Maddox has a theory about students not liking the idea of school and authority and thinking that it is a prison. He tests this theory and examines the boundaries of authority and his friendships. A few years before, a student, John Stanton was committed to an insane asylum, for reasons unknown to most everybody except the principal. One day he escapes, releasing everyone else from the asylums around. Maddox sees this defiance which is the start of his anarchy. Maddox wants to "help him" and understand him more so they start a correspondence and Stanton tells him what to do and how to do it. This is includes the erasing of student grades, posting posters/fliers, and locking part of the student body in a room, among other things. Maddox gets his friends involved and challenges authority and gets most of the school behind him, including an administrator for a while. He is so consumed with creating chaos and disorder that his friends start to see the destruction, but they have to save themselves, and him before he can take complete control over the school.

== Cast ==
- Todd Field as Mr. Walsh
- Will Estes as Chris
- Blake Shields as Will Maddox
- Kevin Christy as Clip
- Melissa George as Amanda
- Raymond J. Barry as Edwards
- Gabriel Mann as Mike Wilson
- Brad Eric Johnson as Knox
- Lamar Benson as Football Player
- Nick Sandow as Armstrong
- Michael Shannon as John Stanton

== Production ==
In August 1999, it was reported that after gaining recognition for his opening title sequence work on films such as Seven, Kyle Cooper would be making his directorial debut with New Port South. The film was set up at Touchstone and would be produced by John Hughes whose son James Hughes wrote the screenplay. In December of that year, it was reported that Raymond J. Barry would play a high school principal in the film which would follow in Hughes' tradition of exploring themes of teenage rebellion against authority.

== Filming locations ==
- Libertyville High School, Libertyville, Illinois (and the city of Libertyville itself).
- Lake Bluff, Illinois

== Home media ==
A region 1 DVD of the film was released on March 12, 2002.
