= Blake Shields =

American actor

- Born: Blake C. Shields; Ithaca, New York, U.S.
- Occupation: Actor
- Years active: 1999–present

Blake C. Shields is an American film and television actor.

== Biography ==
Shields was born in Ithaca, New York. He is the second child and has one older brother and two younger sisters. He spent most of his childhood globetrotting the world with his family of six until finally settling down in Israel. After returning to the United States as a precocious and cultured youngster, he devoted much of his time and passion to the Idaho Shakespeare Festival and the theater group the Washington Street Players. He went on to star in major theater productions such as A Midsummer Night's Dream and Hamlet.

In 2000, Shields filmed his first widely released feature film in Boys and Girls opposite Freddie Prinze Jr. He also starred in New Port South, a film written by James Hughes. He was a series regular on Carnivàle and Sleeper Cell. Additional credits include JAG, The Closer, CSI: Crime Scene Investigation, and Cold Case Files.

Shields lives in Los Angeles. Among other parts, he played the villain Flint in NBC's Heroes. He was also cast as a serial killer in an episode of Criminal Minds ("Hopeless").

== Filmography ==
=== Film ===
Year	Title	Role	Notes
2000	Crime and Punishment in Suburbia	Moznick	
2000	Boys and Girls	Homecoming Knight	
2001	New Port South	Will Maddox	
2003	Going Down	Bob	
2009	Tekken	Hansu	
2017	Live or Die in La Honda	Blake Baker	
2024	Armor	Tex	
2024	Dead Wrong	Jacob Glass	

=== Television ===
Year	Title	Role	Notes
1999	Boy Meets World	Tony	Episode: "What a Drag!"
2000	Freaks and Geeks	Rick Phillips	Episode: "The Diary"
2002	Undeclared	Henry	Episode: "Truth or Dare"
2002	JAG	Tim Hawley	Episode: "Hero Worship"
2003, 2009	CSI: Crime Scene Investigation	Blaine, Ronald Tobin	Episodes: "All for Our Country", "Lover's Lanes"
2003–2005	Carnivàle	Osgood	Recurring role
2004	Cold Case	Barry Tepler	Episode: "Hubris"
2004	The Hollow	Rob	TV film
2005	Sleeper Cell	Thomas 'Tommy' Emerson	Main role
2006	Veronica Mars	Officer Harrison	Episode: "President Evil"
2006–2008	Heroes	Flint Gordon, Jr.	Recurring role (season 3)
2007	Crossing Jordan	Off. Conner Greco	Episode: "33 Bullets"
2007	The Closer	Bill Hawthorn	Episode: "Blindsided"
2007–2008	K-Ville	Jeff 'Glue Boy' Gooden	Main role
2008	Bones	Chuck Kennedy	Episode: "The He in the She"
2009	Eleventh Hour	Greg Filmore	Episode: "H2O"
2009	Criminal Minds	J.R. Baker	Episode: "Hopeless"
2010	Dark Blue	Neal Erikson	Episode: "Brother's Keeper"
2011	Law & Order: LA	Blake Humphry	Episode: "Big Rock Mesa"
2011	CSI: Miami	Kurt Riggins	Episode: "Long Gone"
2011	The Whole Truth	Kevin O'Shea	Episode: "Perfect Witness"
2012	The Finder	Eddie Ross (young)	Episode: "Bullets"
2015	The Mentalist	Mike Milligan	Episode: "Green Light"
2015	CSI: Cyber	Jeremy Spitz	Episode: "Bit by Bit"
2015	Aquarius	Drew	Episode: "A Whiter Shade of Pale"
2015	Castle	Eric Logan	Episode: "What Lies Beneath"
2017	Rosewood	Asa Stratton	Episode: "Naegleria & Neighborhood Watch"
2018	Lucifer	Liam Wade	Episode: "Infernal Guinea Pig"
2019	Good Girls	Drug Dealer	Episode: "The Dubby"
2021	American Horror Stories	Bob Birch	Episode: "Feral"
2021	9-1-1: Lonestar	An injured Bomber	Episode: "Bad Call"
2023	Mayor of Kingstown	Morrisey	Episode: "Santa Jesus"
2025	The Pitt	Hank	Episode: "9:00 A.M"
2025	FBI	Daryl Lee Ricklan	Episode: "Acolyte"
