= Cody Fern =

Australian actor (born 1988)

- Born: 6 July 1988 (age 38); Southern Cross, Western Australia, Australia
- Education: Curtin University of Technology
- Occupations: Actor; director
- Years active: 2008–present

Cody Fern (born 6 July 1988) is an Australian director and actor. Following his feature debut in The Tribes of Palos Verdes (2017), he played a supporting role in the FX series The Assassination of Gianni Versace: American Crime Story (2018). Later that year, Fern played the Antichrist Michael Langdon in American Horror Story: Apocalypse and appeared in the final season of the Netflix drama House of Cards.

A frequent collaborator of Ryan Murphy, Fern subsequently appeared in two seasons of American Horror Story, starring in its ninth season 1984 and guest-starring in the tenth season Double Feature. He has also appeared in two episodes of the spin-off series American Horror Stories. In 2025, he appeared in the Apple TV+ series Foundation.

== Early life and education ==
Fern was born on 6 July 1988 in Southern Cross in rural Western Australia. He attended boarding school at Merredin Senior High School, and graduated from Curtin University of Technology with an honours degree in commerce in 2009.

== Career ==
Fern had initially considered a career in finance before pursuing acting. According to an interview with Anthem Magazine, he hated his life while working in finance. He said, "This is not what I want my life to be. But I'm here and I'm doing it and I'm trying to fit in." It was the Cate Blanchett-starring film duology Elizabeth and Elizabeth: The Golden Age that made him want to become an actor.

Fern has trained with acting coaches, including Ellen Burstyn, Larry Moss, and Susan Batson. Fern played the lead role of Albert in the National Theatre of Great Britain's production War Horse, which received critical acclaim.

In 2011, Fern played Romeo in Shakespeare WA's production of Romeo and Juliet, Lindsay in the Black Swan Theatre Company's Jandamarra, and the Earl of Southampton in the world premiere production of The Enchanters at the State Theatre of Western Australia. He has appeared in a number of short films, including the Western Australian Screen Award-winning film Still Take You Home (2010) and The Last Time I Saw Richard (2014).

In 2014, Fern was the recipient of the annual Heath Ledger Scholarship by Australians in Film, an award aimed at financially and professionally supporting actors of Australian descent. This includes, besides a cash fund, a two-year scholarship at Los Angeles' Stella Adler Academy of Acting and Theatre and mentorship from the father of actor Heath Ledger.

He appeared as Jim Mason in The Tribes of Palos Verdes and wrote, directed and starred in the short film Pisces opposite Keir Gilchrist in 2017. In a Los Angeles Times sit-down interview, Fern had planned to take an 18-month hiatus from acting to focus on Pisces when Versace came along.

In 2018, Fern made his television debut in the acclaimed FX true crime anthology series The Assassination of Gianni Versace: American Crime Story as David Madson which earned him the Gold Derby TV Award for Movie/Limited Series Supporting Actor and a nomination for Breakthrough Performer of the Year. He was announced to star in the series regular role of Duncan Shepherd on the final season of House of Cards. The same year, Fern portrayed the Antichrist Michael Langdon in the eighth season of FX horror anthology series American Horror Story, titled Apocalypse. In 2019, Fern played Xavier Plympton in the ninth season of the show, American Horror Story: 1984.

In 2021, Fern portrayed Stan Vogel in American Horror Stories episode Feral, and Valiant Thor in American Horror Story, Double Feature: Death Valley. In 2022, he portrayed Thomas Browne in American Horror Stories episode Milkmaids. In 2022, Fern played a priest named Jacob in the film Father Stu.

In May 2025, it was announced that Fern would be making his feature film directorial debut with Closing Night starring Sarah Paulson, Toni Collette, Dianne Wiest, and Toby Wallace.

== Filmography ==
=== Film ===
Year	Title	Role	Notes
2008	Hole in the Ground	Zack	Short film
2010	Still Take You Home	Milk	Short film
2010	Drawn Home	Steve	Short film
2011	3AM	Nj	Short film
2014	The Last Time I Saw Richard	Richard	Short film
2017	The Tribes of Palos Verdes	Jim Mason	
2017	Pisces	Charlie	Short film; also director and writer
2018	The Great Darkened Days	Travelling Salesman	
2022	Father Stu	Jacob	
2023	Fairyland	Eddie Body	
2025	Jimpa	Himself	Cameo
2026	Closing Night †	—N/a	Post-production; director and writer only

=== Television ===
Year	Title	Role	Notes
2014	Christmas Eve, 1914	Arnold Chapman	Television film
2018	The Assassination of Gianni Versace: American Crime Story	David Madson	Recurring role; 4 episodes
2018	American Horror Story: Apocalypse	Michael Langdon	Main role; 9 episodes
2018	House of Cards	Duncan Shepherd	Main role; 6 episodes
2019	American Horror Story: 1984	Xavier Plympton	Main role; 9 episodes
2021	Eden	Andy Dolan	Main role; 3 episodes
2021	American Horror Story: Double Feature	Valiant Thor	Recurring role; 2 episodes
2021–2022	American Horror Stories	Stan Vogel	Episode: "Feral"
2021–2022	American Horror Stories	Thomas Browne	Episode: "Milkmaids"
2025	Foundation	Toran Mallow	Main role; 8 episodes (season 3)

== Stage ==
Year	Title	Role	Ref.
2009	Alaska	Chris	
2011	Romeo and Juliet	Romeo	
2011	Jandamarra	Lindsay	
2011	The Enchanters	Earl of Southampton	
2013	War Horse	Albert	

== Video games ==
Year	Title	Role	Notes	Ref.
2023	Star Wars Jedi: Survivor	Dagan Gera	Voice, motion capture, and likeness	
