= Dov Kleiman =

American sports media personality

- Occupations: Social media personality News aggregator

Dov Kleiman is a sports media personality, known for his National Football League (NFL) news aggregation on X (Twitter).

== Career ==
Kleiman has writing credits on various sports media websites, including for OutKick, as a guest columnist on Pro Football Network. and as a sportswriter and associate editor for BroBible.com, with his biography on the latter stating he has covered the NFL for nearly a decade. He has also been noted for his NFL news aggregation. On his X (formerly Twitter) account, he "packages quotes, news, rumors and stories". Sports media websites have cited or reposted his tweets relating to both NFL news and general content. His listing of the most-recent first-round quarterback selections by each team was referenced by USA Today's Saints Wire.

Front Office Sports reported that Kleiman sought $75,000 for his X account in December 2023. Kleiman stated that he cannot comment on the account. By April 2024, his account had accumulated nearly 300,000 followers.

== Reception and criticism ==
While some media outlets have referred to him as a reporter, other media members have stated the opposite. In March 2023, Boomer Esiason and Gregg Giannotti of Boomer and Gio called him a "compiler". Giannotti also added "he doesn't report anything on his own". Kleiman responded to this criticism, stating "I'm aggregating the news. It's no different than many, many other media outlets".

Kleiman has received criticism for his social media posts, which have included "outright falsehoods". After Kleiman pointed out Las Vegas Raiders quarterback Derek Carr posting himself in a vest, Carr directly questioned what Kleiman was "trying to imply". The two later settled the matter. In March 2024, Kleiman posted a quote from former NFL executive Michael Lombardi about Raiders head coach Antonio Pierce. Lombardi later went on the Pat McAfee Show and strongly denounced Kleiman and his post, stating his comments were taken out of context. In April, he was noted for posting about the release date of NCAA Football 25, though without a source. In May, Kleiman again received criticism, this time for a post congratulating Raiders owner Mark Davis on the pregnancy of Hayden Hopkins, who Kleiman referred to as Davis' girlfriend. Hopkins called the post "wildly untrue". McAfee referenced the initial information on his show and later issued an apology, stating "I apologize for perpetuating a lie". Kleiman's post was later deleted.

Colin Salao of TheStreet wrote that "Another reason for the backlash against Kleiman is that the manager of the account is not a visible member in the sports media space. Many have speculated that the account's manager isn't even a real person". In March 2025, Kleiman led a campaign on Twitter to fire ESPN personality Mina Kimes over her criticism of the Trump administration for removing a page honoring Jackie Robinson's military service from the Department of Defense website as part of its anti-DEI campaign. Kimes responded by writing that Kleiman "keeps posting weird stuff about me today."
