= Caitlin Dulany =

American actress

- Occupations: Actress, activist
- Years active: 1992–present

Caitlin Dulany is an American actress and activist.

== Early life ==
Following multiple accusations, against Harvey Weinstein, including one in which she was named, Dulany and Jessica Barth launched Voices in Action. Dulany's story was told in Untouchable, a documentary about the Harvey Weinstein story.

== Career ==
Dulany's career began at the age of 14 when she was cast in an off-Broadway play, Playing Dolls at Ensemble Studio Theatre in Manhattan. She subsequently graduated from Northwestern University with a BA in Theatre, and pursued a bi-coastal acting career.

Her film work includes Red Shoe Diaries, Maniac Cop III, Rescuing Desire, the Todd Phillip's produced Project X, Spike Lee's Oldboy and Akiva Goldsman's directorial debut, Winter's Tale. Among her television roles are: guest appearances on Ally McBeal, Law & Order, CSI: Miami, Castle, Criminal Minds, Life Goes On and Moon Over Miami (TV series). She has also played recurring roles as a love interest to Anthony Edwards on ER and as Holly Hunter's sister on Saving Grace. In 2022, she appeared as a witch in the second-season premiere of American Horror Stories.

== Filmography ==
=== Film ===
Year	Title	Role	Notes
1992	Maniac Cop III: Badge of Silence	Dr. Susan Fowler	
1993	Trouble Shooters: Trapped Beneath the Earth	Claudia	Television film
1994	Class of 1999 II: The Substitute	Jenna McKensie	
1996	Rescuing Desire	Evonne	
1999	Facade	Connie	
1999	The Sky is Falling	Carrie	
2009	Transformers: Revenge of the Fallen	CNN Reporter	Uncredited
2012	Project X	Thomas' Mom	
2013	Oldboy	Emma Pryce	
2014	Winter's Tale	Librarian	
2019	Untouchable	Herself	Documentary; Uncredited
2023	Big Life	Becky Williams	

=== Television ===
Year	Title	Role	Notes
1992	Pros and Cons	1991-1992	Episode: "The Ex Spots the Mark"
1992	Baywatch	Trish Buckley	Episode: "Reunion"
1992	Nurses	Randi	Episode: "Moon Over Miami"
1992	Life Goes On	Natalie Stone	Episode: "The Fairy Tale"
1992	Mann & Machine	Ingrid	Episode: "No Pain, No Gain"
1992–1993	Dark Justice	Veronica	2 episodes
1992	Red Shoe Diaries	Claudia	Episode: "Auto Erotica"
1994	Law & Order	Lisa Cole	Episode: "Snatched"
1995	New York Undercover	New School	Episode: "Private Enemy No. 1"
1997	The Drew Carey Show	Robin	Episode: "They're Back"
1997	ER	Heather Morgan	4 episodes
1997	House of Frankenstein	Weston	Recurring role; 2 episodes Miniseries
1998	Ally McBeal	Laura Jewell	Episode: "The Real World"
1999	Beyond Belief: Fact or Fiction	Angie Bender	Episode: "Get Your Kicks at Motel 66"
2003	CSI: Miami	Erin Murphy	Episode: "Forced Entry"
2006	According to Jim	Heather	Episode: "Daddy Dearest"
2007	Justice	Mrs. Marshall	Episode: "False Confession"
2009	Ghost Whisperer	Rosalyn	Episode: "Delusions of Grandview"
2009	Eleventh Hour	Diane Factal	Episode: "Olfactus"
2009	Castle	Mrs. Kendall	Episode: "Hedge Fund Homeboys"
2009–2010	Saving Grace	Mary Francis Norman	3 episodes
2011	Criminal Minds	Linda Owens	Episode: "Out of the Light"
2016	Mistresses	Hannah	Episode: "Mistaken Identity"
2022	American Horror Stories	Anna Leigh Leighton	Episode: "Dollhouse"
