= Nicolas Bechtel =

American actor (born 2005)

- Born: Nicolas Joseph Bechtel; February 15, 2005 (age 21); Fontana, California
- Occupation: Actor
- Years active: 2012–present
- Known for: General Hospital; Stuck in the Middle

Nicolas Joseph Bechtel (born February 15, 2005) is an American actor. He is best known for his portrayal of Spencer Cassadine (2013–2020) on ABC's General Hospital and Lewie Diaz on the Disney Channel sitcom Stuck in the Middle.

== Early life ==
Bechtel is the son of Nick and Julie Bechtel. He was born on February 15, 2005, in Fontana, California. He has an older sister, Nicole. His middle name is Joseph, after his maternal grandfather, with whom Bechtel is very close.

== Career ==
Bechtel made his television debut in a 2012 episode of the NBC soap opera, Days of Our Lives in the role of Josh. In May 2013, Bechtel made his debut in the role of Spencer on General Hospital. In 2014, Bechtel announced that he was cast in Fox's Steven Spielberg produced comedic drama, Red Band Society. He would play a younger version of Nolan Sotillo's Jordi. Bechtel appeared in three episodes. In 2015, Bechtel was cast in the Disney pilot for Stuck in the Middle led by Jenna Ortega. The series premiered in March 2016. In 2016, Bechtel appeared as Rob Kardashian in FX's anthology series, The People v. O. J. Simpson: American Crime Story. Stuck in the Middle was cancelled after three seasons in 2018. In 2019, Bechtel was cast opposite fellow General Hospital alumni, Nathan Parsons in the Jeremy Camp biopic, I Still Believe which hit theaters in March 2020. Bechtel reprised the role of Spencer for one episode on January 20, 2020. It would turn out to be Bechtel's last appearance in the role as the character was recast in 2021.

== Filmography ==
Year	Title	Role	Notes
2012	Days of Our Lives	Josh	October 16, 2012, episode
2013	The Goodwin Games	Young Keith	Episode: "Welcome Home, Goodwins"
2013	Good Luck Charlie	Hudson	Episode: "Fright Night"
2013	The List	Adam	Television film
2013	General Hospital	Spencer Cassadine	Recurring role, 109 episodes
2014	Baby Daddy	Little Ben	Episode: "Send in the Clowns"
2014	Rake	Max Leon	7 episodes
2014	Girl Meets World	Simon P. Littleboyeater	Episode: "Girl Meets World of Terror"
2014	Red Band Society	Young Jordi	3 episodes
2015	Grey's Anatomy	Jack	Episode: "Where Do We Go From Here?"
2015	Underdog Kids	Sean	Supporting role
2016	The People v. O. J. Simpson: American Crime Story	Rob Kardashian	4 Episodes
2016	Stuck in the Middle	Lewie Diaz	Series regular; 57 episodes
2020	I Still Believe	Jared	Supporting role
2021	American Horror Stories	Rory	Episode: "Game Over"

== Awards and nominations ==
List of awards and nominations for Nicolas Bechtel
Year	Award	Category	Work	Result	Ref.
2016	Daytime Emmy Award	Outstanding Younger Actor in a Drama Series	General Hospital	Nominated	
2016	Young Entertainer Award	Best Young Actor - Drama Series	General Hospital	Nominated	
