= Snowfall (TV series) =

American crime drama television series

- Genre: Crime drama
- Created by: John Singleton; Eric Amadio; Dave Andron
- Starring: Damson Idris; Carter Hudson; Emily Rios; Sergio Peris-Mencheta; Michael Hyatt; Amin Joseph; Angela Lewis; Juan Javier Cardenas; Isaiah John; Filipe Valle Costa; Alon Aboutboul; Malcolm Mays; Marcus Henderson; Kevin Carroll; Devyn A. Tyler; Gail Bean; Alejandro Edda
- Composer: Jeff Russo
- Country of origin: United States
- Original language: English
- No. of seasons: 6
- No. of episodes: 60

Production
- Executive producers: Dave Andron; Eric Amadio; Trevor Engelson; Michael London; Thomas Schlamme; John Singleton; Leonard Chang
- Producers: Nicolas Stern; Julie DeJoie; Evan Silverberg; Karen Mayeda Vranek
- Production location: Los Angeles, California
- Cinematography: Jeffrey Greeley
- Running time: 41–58 minutes
- Production companies: Shoe Money Productions; Dave & Ron Productions; New Deal Entertainment; Groundswell Productions; Underground Films; FXP

Original release
- Network: FX
- Release: July 5, 2017 – April 19, 2023

Related
- The Drop: A Snowfall Saga

Snowfall is an American crime drama television series, created by John Singleton, Eric Amadio, and Dave Andron for FX. The series premiered on July 5, 2017, and concluded on April 19, 2023, after six seasons consisting of 60 episodes.

Comprising an ensemble cast, the series follows the lives of an African American crime family, led by budding drug dealer Franklin Saint (portrayed by Damson Idris), as they navigate ways to make money selling crack cocaine during the 1980s crack epidemic in South Central Los Angeles. The series also explores the CIA's involvement in the fight against communism in Nicaragua through CIA operative Teddy McDonald (portrayed by Carter Hudson), Mexican luchador Gustavo "El Oso" Zapata (portrayed by Sergio Peris-Mencheta), and a Mexican cartel boss's daughter, Lucia Villanueva (portrayed by Emily Rios).

The series, which first began development at Showtime in 2014, was picked up by FX for a ten-episode first season in September 2016. In August 2017, the series was renewed for a second season, which premiered on July 19, 2018. In September 2018, the series was renewed for a third season, which premiered on July 10, 2019. In August 2019, the series was renewed for a fourth season, which premiered on February 24, 2021. In March 2021, the series was renewed for a fifth season, which premiered on February 23, 2022. In April 2022, the series was renewed for a sixth and final season, which premiered on February 22, 2023, with the series finale airing on April 19, 2023.

A spin-off series titled The Drop: A Snowfall Saga, with Gail Bean and Isaiah John reprising their respective roles as Wanda Bell-Simmons and Leon Simmons, premiered on September 8, 2026.

== Premise ==
Primarily set in Los Angeles between 1983 and 1986, the series revolves around the first crack epidemic and its impact on the city, and the stories of several characters whose lives are fated to intersect: 20-year-old drug dealer Franklin Saint, CIA operative Teddy McDonald, Mexican luchador Gustavo "El Oso" Zapata, and a Mexican crime boss's daughter, Lucia Villanueva.

== Cast and characters ==
=== Main ===
- Damson Idris as Franklin Saint, a young drug kingpin and patriarch of The Family, a crew of crack cocaine producers/dealers based in South Central Los Angeles.
- Carter Hudson as Theodore "Teddy" McDonald / Reed Thompson, a CIA operative working undercover for the American government in the war against communism in Nicaragua.
- Emily Rios as Lucia Villanueva (seasons 1–2), the daughter of a Mexican crime boss and heiress to the Villanueva Cartel, a Mexican drug cartel.
- Sergio Peris-Mencheta as Gustavo "El Oso" Zapata, a former Mexican luchador employed as an enforcer for the Villanueva Cartel.
- Michael Hyatt as Sharon "Cissy" Saint, Franklin's mother and a veteran real estate agent.
- Amin Joseph as Jerome Saint, Franklin's OG uncle and a member of The Family and teaches his nephew the ins and outs of drug dealing and gangster life.
- Angela Lewis as Louanne "Louie" Saint (née Jones), Jerome's girlfriend (and later wife), a former hustler, and member of The Family.
- Juan Javier Cardenas as Alejandro Usteves (season 1), a Nicaraguan Contra soldier and pilot who works with Teddy as a CIA asset by smuggling cocaine.
- Isaiah John as Leon Simmons, Franklin's best friend and second-in-command of the Family who is affiliated with the PJ Watts Crips.
- Filipe Valle Costa as Pedro Nava (seasons 1–2), Lucia's cousin and a member of The Villanueva Cartel.
- Alon Aboutboul as Avi Drexler (Hebrew: אבי דרכסלר) (seasons 1–5), an Israeli drug lord and the head of a powerful Israeli crime syndicate with connections to Mossad.
- Malcolm Mays as Kevin Hamilton (seasons 1–2), Franklin and Leon's childhood friend and a member of The Family.
- Marcus Henderson as Andre Wright (season 3; recurring season 1; guest season 2), a sergeant in the LAPD, Melody's father and Franklin's neighbor.
- Kevin Carroll as Alton Williams (season 4; recurring seasons 2–3; guest season 1), Franklin's estranged recovering alcoholic father and a former member of the Black Panthers.
- Devyn A. Tyler as Veronique Turner (seasons 5–6), Franklin's girlfriend and a non-practicing lawyer who uses her real estate firm to establish drug fronts for The Family.
- Gail Bean as Wanda Bell-Simmons (season 6; recurring seasons 2–5), Leon's girlfriend, and later wife, who develops a strong addiction to crack cocaine and later was detoxed.
- Alejandro Edda as Rubén (season 6; recurring season 5), a Cuban spy affiliated with the KGB who works with the Saints as part of a plan to eliminate Teddy.

=== Recurring ===
- Reign Edwards as Melody Wright (seasons 1–3; guest season 4), Franklin's on/off girlfriend and Andre's daughter.
- Peta Sergeant as Julia (seasons 1, 3; guest seasons 2, 5–6), Teddy's ex-wife, mother of their son Paul, and a CIA agent.
- Jonathan Avigdori as Yuda (seasons 1, 3; guest season 2), one of Avi's two bodyguards.
- Nic Bishop as James Ballard (season 1; guest season 2), Teddy's first CIA handler.
- Judith Scott as Claudia Crane (seasons 1–2; guest season 3), the owner of a local nightclub and Louie's former lover.
- Moe Irvin as Santos (season 1; guest season 3), Claudia's head of security.
- Taylor Kowalski as Rob Volpe (seasons 1–3; guest seasons 4–5), Franklin's friend from high school, a crack bagger, and a member of The Family.
- Carlos Linares as Mauricio Villanueva (season 1), Lucia's father and the patriarch of the Villanueva Cartel.
- José Zúñiga as Ramiro Nava (season 1), Lucia's maternal uncle, Pedro's father, and the second-in-command of the Villanueva Cartel.
- Tony Sancho as Eduardo "Stomper" Castillo (season 1; guest season 2), the leader of Los Monarcas, a Mexican street gang.
- Markice Moore as Ray-Ray (season 1; guest season 2), a reckless thief from Compton.
- Craig Tate as Lenny (season 1), a violent thief from Compton and Ray-Ray's friend.
- Justine Lupe as Victoria Grelli (season 1), a young woman who befriends Teddy whilst looking for her missing sister Kristen.
- Michael Ray Escamilla as Hernan Zapata (seasons 1, 3–4; guest season 2), Gustavo's brother who is a wheelchair user.
- Wade Allain-Marcus as Diego (season 2; guest seasons 1, 4), a co-leader of the Cali Cartel, a Colombian crime syndicate.
- Izzy Diaz as Danilo (season 2; guest seasons 1, 4), Diego's brother and a co-leader of the Cali Cartel.
- Jonathan Tucker as Matt McDonald (season 2; guest season 3), Teddy's younger brother, a Vietnam War veteran and a pilot.
- DeRay Davis as DeJohn "Peaches" Hill (seasons 2–5; guest season 6), a Vietnam War veteran and enforcer for The Family.
- Adriana DeGirolami as Lorena Cardenas / Soledad Caro (seasons 2–3), Pedro's fiancée and an undercover DEA agent from Texas.
- Marcelo Olivas as Santiago "Conejo" Estrada (season 2), an OG soldado who works with Los Manarcas.
- Scott Subiono as Tony Marino (seasons 2–3, 6; guest seasons 4–5), a DEA Agent and Lorena's handler who works to stop the crack cocaine trade in Los Angeles.
- Matthew Alan as Stephen Havemeyer (seasons 3–4, 6; guest seasons 2, 5), Teddy's second CIA handler.
- Jordan Coleman as Thaddeus "Fatback" Barber (seasons 3–4), Leon's bodyguard and a member of The Family.
- Bentley Green as C.J. (seasons 3–4), an up-and-coming member of The Family.
- Melvin Gregg as Drew "Manboy" Miller (seasons 3–4), Franklin's associate and the leader of the Compton Crips.
- Calvin Clausell Jr. as Bootsy (season 3; guest season 4), the second-in-command of the Compton Crips.
- Christian Tappan as Rigo Vasco (season 3), a drug lord associated with the Medellín Cartel, a Colombian crime syndicate.
- Asjha Cooper as Eva Walker (season 3), one of Melody's best friends, and Leon's fling.
- Nate' Jones as Shon-Shon (season 3), A former friend-turned-rival of Melody and Eva.
- Jesse Luken as Herb "Nix" Nixon (season 3; guest season 4), a rogue corporal in the LAPD and Andre's friend.
- Evan Allen-Gessesse as Renny (seasons 4–6; guest seasons 2–3), an enforcer for The Family.
- De'Aundre Bonds as Terrence "Skully" Brown (seasons 3–6), the OG Leader of the Inglewood Bloods.
- Suzy Nakamura as Irene Abe (season 4), a journalist working for the Los Angeles Herald Examiner who investigates the ongoing drug trade in Los Angeles.
- Stephen Ruffin as Wilson (season 4), Irene's assistant at the Los Angeles Herald Examiner.
- Kwame Patterson as Lurp (season 4), a freelancer, Vietnam War Veteran, Franklin's bodyguard, and a member of The Family.
- Geffri Maya as Khadijah Brown (season 4), Skully's wife, the mother of his daughter, Tianna Brown, and the sister of Manboy.
- Adrianna Mitchell as Tanosse (season 4), Franklin's ex-girlfriend from high school whom he reconnects with.
- Ezana Alem as Dimehead (season 4), a reckless member of the Compton Crips.
- Joey Marie Urbina as Xiamara (seasons 4–6), Nuvia's sister and later Gustavo's girlfriend.
- Christine Horn as Beverly "Black Diamond" Young (seasons 4–5; guest season 6), a bounty hunter and later an enforcer for The Family.
- Taylor Polidore as Dallas Ali (seasons 4–5; guest season 6), a bounty hunter, Black Diamond's partner, and later an enforcer for The Family.
- Cordaro Kendricks as Cornrows (season 4; guest seasons 3 and 5), Skully's right-hand man.
- Quincy Chad as Deon "Big D" Barber (seasons 5–6; guest season 4), Fatback's cousin and the OG leader of the PJ Watts Crips.
- Kamron Alexander as Einstein (seasons 5–6; guest season 4), the brains behind Deon's Crip set.
- Brandon Jay McLaren as Beau Buckley (seasons 5–6), a dirty cop on Louie's payroll and a leading detective in the LAPD involved in the C.R.A.S.H. unit, later became Louie's enforcer after being fired.
- DeLaRosa Rivera as Eddie Perez (season 5), a detective in the LAPD and Buckley's partner.
- Tiffany Lonsdale as Parissa (seasons 5–6), an Iranian surgeon and old acquaintance of Teddy.
- DeVaughn Nixon as Kane Hamilton (seasons 5–6), Kevin's OG older brother and a former shot caller for the Hoover Crips who, after being released from prison, plots revenge against The Family.
- Nupeir L. Garret as Ricky (seasons 5–6), Kane's second-in-command.
- Damien D. Smith as Top Notch (season 6; guest seasons 3–4), an old friend of Alton's and a private investigator with criminal connections.
- Danielle Larracuente as Amanda Guerrero (season 6), a DEA agent and part of Marino's team.
- Arsenio Castellanos as Oscar (season 6), a DEA agent and another member of Marino's team.
- Tamara Taylor as Cassandra Turner (season 6), Veronique's estranged mother and a con-artist who works with her daughter to recover Franklin's stolen money.

=== Guest ===
- Eric Mitro as Logan Miller (season 1), Alejandro's previous CIA connection who overdoses on cocaine.
- Taylor Kowald as Kristen Grelli (season 1), Victoria's sister who is killed by Alejandro to cover loose ends.
- Adam Karst as Muir (seasons 1–3, 5), another of Avi's two bodyguards.
- Becky O'Donohue as Mrs. Volpe (season 1), Rob's attractive mother.
- Mark Harelik as Arnold Tulfowitz (seasons 1, 3), Cissy's former employer and a corrupt real estate tycoon.
- Sheaun McKinney as Karvel (seasons 1, 3), a sadist, ruthless gangster and member of The HTB Western Tribe.
- Zabryna Guevara as Elena Usteves (seasons 1–2), Alejandro's wife and the leader of a Contra cell in Nicaragua.
- Bokeem Woodbine as Knees (season 1), an old friend of Jerome's and a former drug dealer.
- Frank Merino as Guillermo "Memo" Mendoza (seasons 1–2), an enforcer for Los Monarcas.
- RZA as Swim (season 1), a drug dealer in Oakland who teaches Franklin how to turn cocaine into crack.
- Red Grant as Devon Hamilton (season 1), Kevin's cousin in Oakland and a member of an Outlaw Biker Club.
- Billy Boyd as Jim Stewart (season 1), a man Teddy and Victoria approach for his information about Kristen.
- Stephanie Nash as Gladys Warren (seasons 1–2), Teddy's assistant at the CIA.
- Saundra Santiago (season 1) and Adriana Barraza (season 3) as Mariela Villanueva, Lucia's mother and the matriarch of the Villanueva Cartel.
- Manuel Uriza as Miguel Villanueva (seasons 2–3), Lucia's paternal uncle who is a private investigator.
- Alanna Ubach as Gabriella Elias (season 2), the leader of La Fuerza, a high-ranking gang in the Mexican Mafia.
- Kirk Baltz as Jim Volpe (season 2), Rob's father who is a pornographic film director and customer to Avi.
- Herve Clermont as Stern (seasons 2–6), a Detective in the LAPD Homicide Division.
- Nathan Davis Jr. as Delroy Hamilton (season 2), Kev's cousin and a new corner boy for the Family.
- Luke Tennie as Vic (season 2), Delroy's partner and a new corner boy for the Family.
- Joy Brunson as Nia Jones (season 2), a social services worker who helps Alton get clean.
- Tinpo Lee as Mr. Cho (season 2), a store owner and Franklin's old boss.
- Kevin Jackson as Johnson Young (season 2), Franklin's lawyer for the murder case.
- C. S. Lee as William Han (season 2), an LA police officer who is the contact for the CIA, FBI, and DEA.
- WC as Dub C (season 2), one of Franklin's cellmates.
- Hector Hugo as Muñoz Avilés (seasons 2–3), Stern's partner and a Detective in the LAPD Homicide Division.
- John Diehl as Colonel Robert McDonald (seasons 3–4, 6), Teddy and Matt's estranged father.
- Sabina Zúñiga Varela as Nuvia Zapata (seasons 3–4), Hernan's stepwife.
- Ariel Eliaz as Lior (seasons 3–4, 6), an enforcer for Avi's Crew, later took over the crew after Avi's death and has it out for Teddy following a gun incident that left him half-deaf.
- Saidah Arrika Ekulona as Bernice Wright (seasons 3–4), Andre's sister and Melody's aunt.
- Kenneth Choi as Bobby "BobBob" Kim (season 3), a former CIA agent in Costa Rica who helps Teddy with supplying weapons to Nicaragua.
- Jordan L. Jones as Bo (season 3), a small-time crack dealer and Wanda's supplier.
- Vonii Bristow as Lamont (season 3), Bo's big-mouthed partner.
- David Warshofsky as Wells (season 3–4), Andre's superior and a captain in the police.
- Brad Griffith as Roger Prentice (seasons 3–4), the Family's new prestigious lawyer.
- Denise Dowse as Mrs. Mosley (seasons 3–4), the owner of the local library in Franklin's neighborhood.
- Lamont Thompson as LJ Mosley (seasons 3–4), Mrs. Mosley's ailing husband and co-owner of the library.
- Andrea Londo as Ximena (season 3), a Panamanian florist whom Franklin charms while on his trip with Avi.
- Antonio Jaramillo as Oscar Fuentes (season 4), the corrupt police chief of the Tijuana Police Department.
- Jesse Garcia as Carlos Lorca (season 4), one of the corrupt Tijuana police officers loyal to Fuentes.
- Jeremiah Birkett as John Baxter (season 4), a homeless crack cocaine addict and single father at Alton's homeless shelter.
- Joshua Caleb Johnson as Dwayne Baxter (season 4), John's teenage son who goes to Alton's shelter, later put into foster care after his father OD'd.
- Myndy Crist as Joanna Bird (season 4), Irene's former Editor-in-chief at the Los Angeles Herald Examiner.
- Brent Jennings as Henry Nelson (season 4), Irene's ex-husband and an independent journalist.
- Steven Williams as Paul Davis (seasons 4, 6), a real estate tycoon with political ties.
- Karl T. Wright as Willy Childress (season 4), Paul Davis' right-hand man.
- Troy Blendell as Charlie Cass (season 4), the acting Editor-in-Chief at the Los Angeles Herald Examiner.
- James Moses Black as Brother Jamal (season 4), the radio talk show host for CO-INTELPRO.
- Nikiya Mathis as Candy (seasons 4–6), Louie's childhood friend, who becomes their connection in Little Rock.
- Kris D. Lofton as Johnny (seasons 4–6), the husband of Louie's friend Candy.
- Jamie Jones as Len Bias (season 5), a promising college basketball player who overdoses on cocaine.
- David Sullivan as Grady Williamson (season 5), a CIA agent who replaces Teddy as the CIA plug.
- Ethan Smart as Thad Brenner (season 5), Rob Volpe's junkie friend and member of the Family.
- Benjamin Earl Turner as Maurice (seasons 5–6), an amateur rapper who lives in the projects overseen by the PJ Watts Crips.
- Steve Suh as Johnny B (season 5), Wanda's boss at the phone-sex hotline center.
- Santiago Veizaga as Clever (season 5), a young gangbanger in Bell Gardens.
- Scytorya Rhodes as Chelle (season 5), a new dancer in Louie's club who is favored by Buckley.
- Simeon Othello Daise as Mello (season 5), one of Skully's ambitious enforcers who wants to run the Inglewood Bloods.
- Manuel Eduardo Ramirez as Tavio (season 5), Clevers father who is the leader of a Mexican gang who tries to rob Gustavo and Franklin.
- Brennan Keel Cook as Oakley (season 5), a Vietnam War veteran and junkie and Peaches' associate.
- Rodney Saulsberry as Dr. Evans (season 5), a war veteran and doctor whom Jerome approaches while trying to find Peaches.
- Raymond J. Barry as Old Man James (season 5), an elderly man who collects hunting trophies and keeps a pet tiger at his house in Bell Gardens.
- Jon Root as William Cox (seasons 5–6), an accountant hired by Teddy to set up untraceable bank accounts.
- Darin Cooper as Jacob (seasons 5–6), an undercover KGB agent in the United States and Rubén's handler.
- McPratt Dadzie as Dodzi (season 6), Leon and Wanda's new friend in Accra.
- Omar Dorsey as Clyde (season 6), an old friend of Jerome's who runs an auto repair shop.
- Aaron Bledsoe as Todd (season 6), Kane's primary chemist in the crack cookhouse.
- Page Kennedy as Percy (season 6), a pimp who specializes in torturing people for information.
- Max Arciniega as Miguel Flores (season 6), a professional locksmith hired by Franklin.

== Episodes ==
=== Series overview ===
Season	Episodes	Originally released	
Season	Episodes	First released	Last released
1	10	July 5, 2017	September 6, 2017
2	10	July 19, 2018	September 20, 2018
3	10	July 10, 2019	September 11, 2019
4	10	February 24, 2021	April 21, 2021
5	10	February 23, 2022	April 20, 2022
6	10	February 22, 2023	April 19, 2023

=== Season 1 (2017) ===
No. overall	No. in season	Title	Directed by	Written by	Original release date	Prod. code	U.S. viewers (millions)
1	1	"Pilot"	Adil El Arbi & Bilall Fallah	Dave Andron & Eric Amadio & John Singleton	July 5, 2017	XNF01001	1.36
In South Central Los Angeles, June of 1983, Franklin Saint sells marijuana for his uncle Jerome. His favorite wrestler, Gustavo "El Oso" Zapata, does work on the side for the Mexican Villanueva Cartel, and is tasked with burglarizing a house by his contact, Pedro Nava. A man enters during the robbery and Gustavo kills him in a struggle. After CIA agent Logan Miller dies of an overdose, Contra soldier Alejandro Usteves approaches Miller's coworker Teddy McDonald and asks him to take up his job of moving cocaine. Franklin's friend and customer Rob Volpe asks him to get cocaine from Israeli drug lord Avi Drexler, who gives him a kilogram to sell within a day. Jerome refuses to help, but his girlfriend Louie Jones introduces Franklin to nightclub owner Claudia Crane, who buys the cocaine on the condition that he brings her more. Franklin notices his homeless, alcoholic father Alton Williams as he leaves, but refuses to speak to him.
2	2	"Make Them Birds Fly"	Adil El Arbi & Bilall Fallah	Dave Andron & Eric Amadio & John Singleton	July 12, 2017	XNF01002	0.965
Gustavo learns that he stole from Pedro's father Ramiro and the man he killed was his employee. Pedro and his cousin, Villanueva heiress Lucia, stole so they could buy cocaine from Alejandro and start their own business. Ramiro demands that either the money is returned or the culprit is caught. Franklin's crush and next door neighbor Melody Wright finds his cocaine, but he brushes her off when she asks about it. He sells it to Claudia, but is mugged by rival dealers Lenny and Ray-Ray while leaving for taking her business from them.
3	3	"Slow Hand"	Dan Attias	Leonard Chang	July 19, 2017	XNF01003	1.05
Franklin gets the muggers' names from Claudia and takes his best friend Leon Simmons to Compton, where they enlist local man Karvel to help find the thieves. They break into Lenny's house, where Karvel beats and rapes him until he gives up the money, which Karvel takes for himself. Teddy notices U.S. serial numbers on a shipment of rocket launchers and worries that they could be traced back to the CIA. He and Alejandro grind them off manually, but he is called by his agent wife Julia, who has discovered what he is doing. She is unable to get him to step away, and he returns to find that an annoyed Alejandro has left and taken the launchers. Gustavo, Lucia, and Pedro agree on who should be framed for the robbery and Gustavo is sent to kill him, but he refuses after seeing the man living peacefully with his boyfriend. They select another target and stake out his home. Franklin asks Jerome for a gun, which he reluctantly hands over.
4	4	"Trauma"	Hiro Murai	Emily Grinwis	July 26, 2017	XNF01004	1.00
The man nearly kills Lucia when they attack him, but Gustavo saves her life and kills him. While Pedro convinces Ramiro that the man was the robber, Gustavo and Lucia bond. Teddy tracks Alejandro to his Contra camp in Nicaragua so they can finish removing the serial numbers. He becomes friendly with a young boy, only to realize that he is an FSLN spy. Alejandro's wife Elena kills the boy when Teddy informs her. Before they leave, Elena gives Teddy a photo of their family to give Alejandro, asking him to pass along the message "don't forget." Franklin and Leon learn that Karvel has already spent the money. They kidnap him and take him to Avi, who advises them to kill Karvel and bury him in the Mojave Desert. Karvel breaks out of their trunk as they take him out. They catch him, but Franklin is disturbed by Karvel pleas for mercy and Leon kills him instead. Franklin sells his motorbike to pay Avi back, but rejects Avi's offer of more cocaine and decides to stop selling.
5	5	"seven-four"	Lawrence Trilling	Jerome Hairston	August 2, 2017	XNF01005	1.01
On the Fourth of July, Teddy and Alejandro's plane breaks down in a Mexican desert and Alejandro is rendered unconscious from a head injury. He eventually wakes up and flies them back to the U.S., while Teddy gives him the photo. Gustavo tells Lucia he can get someone who they can sell to if he is brought into the operation as a full partner. Franklin learns that Alton is in jail and bails him out, so he comes uninvited to Jerome's holiday party and tells Franklin that he knows he is selling. The police arrive when Jerome sets off fireworks and almost choke Franklin out, and Alton slips away without helping. Franklin decides to return to selling for Avi.
6	6	"A Long Time Coming"	Michael Lehmann	Tatiana Suarez-Pico	August 9, 2017	XNF01006	0.845
Teddy goes to D.C. regarding a shipment of Contra guns and has sex with Julia despite their recent estrangement. She warns him not to hide any more of the truth from her. Gustavo takes Lucia to his estranged brother Hernan and asks to meet with Eduardo "Stomper" Castillo, the boss of the Los Monarcas gang. When a Monarca hits on Lucia at the meeting, Gustavo fights him and wins, impressing Stomper and getting him to agree to their terms. Lenny and Ray-Ray stalk Franklin and his friends as they sell, and Melody's police officer father Andre unwittingly saves their lives when he notices the two sitting outside Franklin's house. Franklin pays an associate of Jerome's for the location of the Monarcas so he can sell to them. They try to rob Franklin, but Gustavo rescues him when he recognizes him as a fan. Teddy notices Alejandro staring at a missing poster for a woman named Kristen Grelli, who he admits he killed along with two others for being present the night Miller died.
7	7	"Cracking"	Zetna Fuentes	Aaron Slavick	August 16, 2017	XNF01007	0.814
Pedro observes Gustavo and Lucia having sex and later meets with Ramiro. Alejandro and Teddy trace the number on Kristen's poster to her apartment where they see her sister Victoria, who put up the poster. Teddy finds Victoria at a police station and introduces himself as a concerned friend of one of the dead women. Franklin's friend Kevin Hamilton takes him and Leon to Oakland to meet with his cousin, part of a gang, to set up a deal with the boss. Tired of waiting at the club's party, Franklin wanders the neighborhood and comes across a decrepit Black Panthers building that Alton used to work in. He finds a woman smoking crack inside and asks to meet her dealer, who introduces him to the cooks. They let him watch as they cook his cocaine into crack. He returns to the party to find that he missed the deal. When his friends ask where he was, he shows them the crack, claiming it is "our future."
8	8	"Baby Teeth"	Solvan "Slick" Naim	Story by : Margaret Rose Lester; Teleplay by : Emmy Grinwis & Sal Calleros	August 23, 2017	XNF01008	0.847
Franklin convinces Kevin and Jerome to distribute crack for free and get people interested, but has a fight with Leon over payment. He and Kevin find that they have a horde of customers waiting to buy the next day. Teddy beats a man who tries to extort Victoria over Kristen's last known location, a nightclub. They go there and get Alejandro's address from a waitress, but Teddy fakes being drunk to stall for time. When they arrive at Alejandro's, an agent he called at the club pretends to be the homeowner and turns them away. Lucia visits her dying father Mauricio, while Ramiro tells her that he knows about their operation as well as Gustavo killing his men. Lenny shoots Leon when he goes to Franklin's house to make amends, and Franklin finds him and calls 911. Leon urges him to hide the crack, so he sneaks it into Melody's closet.
9	9	"Story of a Scar"	Meera Menon	Leonard Chang & Jerome Hairston	August 30, 2017	XNF01009	0.914
Franklin returns home from the hospital, where his mother Sharon "Cissy" Saint kicks him out. He gets the crack from Melody's closet, leaving her outraged that he put her at risk. After the Contra camp is raided, Alejandro meets with the Cali Cartel in hopes of getting a new cocaine supplier. Lucia tells Gustavo that Ramiro wants him dead and tries to pay him to leave town. He rejects her offer and convinces Stomper to plan an attack on the Villanuevas. Lucia realizes that Ramiro is setting her up to be replaced, while Mauricio succumbs to his illness. Teddy learns that Victoria has a picture of Alejandro taken by the club's photographer. Franklin gets Claudia to set up a meeting with Ray-Ray on the condition that he gets Louie to talk to her, the two of them being on and off lovers. He and Ray-Ray meet and agree on something.
10	10	"The Rubicon"	John Singleton	Dave Andron	September 6, 2017	XNF01010	0.854
Jerome joins Franklin's business. Franklin returns home to get his things, learning that Cissy has been fired from her job and leaving drug money for her. Avi raises the price on cocaine when Jerome mouths off to him, and he suggests to Franklin that they find whoever sells to Avi. Teddy asks Alejandro to leave town until he stops Victoria. He discovers some of his tools missing and rushes to Victoria's house, where he finds Alejandro cutting up her body and kills him. He asks his supervisor James Ballard to let him out of the operation, but learns that the Contras are back in business and that Ronald Reagan is impressed with his work. He meets with the sibling captains of the Calis, Diego and Danilo, and agrees to move cocaine for them. Realizing that she will never be respected in the cartel as a woman, Lucia goes to Gustavo and asks him to launch the attack at Mauricio's funeral, where they kill Ramiro. Ray-Ray brings Lenny to Franklin, who forces him at gunpoint to kill Lenny. Rob follows Teddy after he sells cocaine to Avi. Franklin and his crew, now "The Family", purchase a house and begin to cook in it.

=== Season 2 (2018) ===
No. overall	No. in season	Title	Directed by	Written by	Original release date	Prod. code	U.S. viewers (millions)
11	1	"Sightlines"	Dan Attias	Dave Andron	July 19, 2018	XNF02001	1.16
Four months later, the Calis are late to a drop and Gustavo and Lucia's runners quit, forcing them to do business with another gang led by Gabriella Elias. Lucia later finds Pedro, missing since Ramiro's murder, in her stash house. Avi and Leon are arrested during a buy. Leon's bail bondsman and his brother are killed by Jerome's veteran bodyguard, DeJohn "Peaches" Hill, when they break into his house (where Franklin now lives) because of how casually he paid Leon's hefty bail. With Congress refusing to fund the Contras, Ballard orders Teddy to up his cocaine distribution. He convinces his brother Matt to act as a pilot for the operation and pulls the files on Avi's arrest. Getting Franklin's name, Teddy follows him as he leaves Jerome's, running his car off the road and tasing him.
12	2	"The Day"	Sunu Gonera	Leonard Chang	July 26, 2018	XNF02002	0.888
Pedro explains that he hid after believing he would be killed after Ramiro, where he got engaged to a woman, Soledad Caro. He asks to return to the operation, but Lucia, uncomfortable with Soledad knowing their business, tries to dissuade him. She gives two Family dealers, one of them Kevin's cousin Delroy, her number to pass along to Franklin. Realizing they were selling on his territory, Stomper has his man Santiago "Conejo" Estrada murder them. Franklin awakens with Leon, who Teddy also kidnapped. After verifying that Leon was bailed out instead of ratting on Avi, he reveals that he caught Rob following him and agrees to sell cocaine to Franklin. Teddy drives them home, and Franklin warns him never to endanger him or his people again. He visits Cissy, who tells him he is only allowed home when he stops selling. He goes to Melody and apologizes for hiding crack in her house. She accepts his apology and invites him in.
13	3	"Prometheus Rising"	Alex Graves	Walter Mosley	August 2, 2018	XNF02003	0.930
Diego and Danilo give the McDonalds a list of difficult demands, which Matt agrees to despite Teddy's objections. Kevin rallies Jerome and Leon after learning about Delroy, but Franklin stops them and contacts Lucia. She refuses to give up Conejo's name but promises to make a deal for compensation, leaving Kevin offended. Rob notes that with Avi in jail, the Valley is an untapped market and offers to start selling there. Melody visits Franklin to have sex, but they are interrupted by Andre, having noticed the missing bondsman's car parked down near Jerome's and warning Franklin to stay away from Melody. Franklin returns to her, but she is no longer in the mood, having heard everything. Police beat up Alton when he refuses to leave a homeless camp.
14	4	"Jingle Bell Rock"	Deborah Chow	Emmy Grinwis	August 9, 2018	XNF02004	0.975
On Christmas Eve, Cissy reluctantly brings Alton home from the hospital. Teddy gets Franklin set up with a bank for money laundering and learns that the city is digging up Prado Regional Park, where Victoria and Alejandro are buried, for the upcoming Olympics. He takes Matt to exhume them. Noticing how unsettled Matt is, he offers to let him leave the operation. Louie leaves the Family after an argument with Jerome. Franklin learns that dissent is growing amongst his men after the recent attacks on dealers, so he takes them to Claudia's for a night of partying. He again argues with Kevin about finding Conejo, and learns that he unauthorizedly took money to give to Delroy's family. Soledad stands up to INS agents that raid the stash house and gets them to leave, impressing Lucia. Soledad later meets with DEA agent Tony Marino, her real name Lorena Cardenas, and he praises her for her good work in the staged raid. The next day, Teddy wakes up to find Matt is still there, and Franklin leaves Cissy a statue he took from the bank before going to run the cook house alone.
15	5	"Serpiente"	Solvan "Slick" Naim	Sal Calleros	August 16, 2018	XNF02005	0.923
Gustavo's palm reader warns him that there is a "serpent" in his life. Avi is released from prison and is enraged to find that Teddy is now supplying for Franklin, refusing to keep working with the latter. Teddy deals with him to get clean guns from Panama. Alton approaches Franklin after Cissy begins having financial troubles, leaving him appalled that they are together again. Cissy claims that she is happy with Alton and does not need Franklin's help. The Monarcas arrive to drop off their drugs and Stomper mocks Pedro for Ramiro's murder. When Gustavo steps in, Stomper threatens him, and Gustavo kills him when he notices a snake tattoo on his arm. Cardenas kills Stomper's men and Lucia is shot in the shoulder during the struggle. Lucia later orders Gustavo to stop all shipments, having deduced from the way Cardenas defended them that she is law enforcement.
16	6	"The Offer"	Michael Lehmann	Janine Salinas Schoenberg & Aaron Slavick	August 23, 2018	XNF02006	0.822
Cardenas convinces Marino to give her two more days to get Teddy before they arrest Lucia and Gustavo. Teddy buys the guns from a Panama City kingpin. He and Matt drink together, arguing about their absent mother and strict father Robert. Upon returning to L.A., Teddy notices Cardenas's car outside his office and leads her away, getting Matt to write down her license plate. Franklin learns that Alton is being falsely sued by the LAPD for assault, but refuses to sign the forms that will keep him out of jail. Rob's father steals cocaine from his son and sells it, but Rob stops Jerome from beating him by offering to pay for the loss himself. Moved by this, Franklin gives Alton the signed paperwork and hires a lawyer for him. Gabriella, also in control of the Monarcas, meets with Lucia about Stomper's disappearance and quickly deduces the truth through her shoulder wound. Lucia promises to hand over the recipe for crack in exchange for her life. Franklin refuses to sell her the recipe, so she offers Conejo to Kevin.
17	7	"The World Is Yours"	Clark Johnson	Dave Andron & Aziza Barnes	August 30, 2018	XNF02007	0.815
Teddy runs Cardenas's plates and learns that she is DEA. Both Avi and the Calis demand their payments from Teddy, but the money is in the monitored office. When the McDonalds go to drop cocaine for Lucia, the Calis, believing they are trying to flee, take Matt hostage until they get their money. Franklin catches Leon's girlfriend Wanda Bell selling stolen crack and orders Leon to remove her from the Family. With her two days up, Marino orders Cardenas to arrest Lucia and Gustavo. Claudia notices Louie trying to run the club herself and insults her in front of guests, leading to an argument that turns physical. Louie calls Jerome and he takes her back. Gustavo and Lucia take Kevin to the park where Conejo sees his daughter under the terms of his custody, and Kevin gives them the recipe. Lucia forces Pedro to admit that he is an informant and that he worked with Cardenas as revenge for Ramiro's murder. She shoots him when he brings up her dead sister, and he accuses her of becoming a monster as he dies.
18	8	"Surrender"	Logan Kibens	Leonard Chang	September 6, 2018	XNF02008	0.752
Gustavo is arrested by the DEA. Lucia gives Gabriella the recipe and allows herself to be arrested, refusing to leave without him. Teddy goes to D.C. so Ballard can help him with the DEA but finds that he was fired. He convinces agent Stephen Havemeyer to take over in exchange for giving up Diego and Danilo. Franklin buys Kevin and Leon new houses, but Kevin is upset to discover that they are registered in Franklin's name. He goes to kill Conejo. Addicted to crack and wanting more, Wanda robs the cook house, and Leon ties her up in his house until she detoxifies. Franklin calls Lucia while she is in custody, and Cardenas has her tell Franklin where Kevin is going so they can catch him. Franklin arrives at the same time as Kevin and tries to stop him, blaming Delroy for his own death. Kevin calls him "a traitor to your people" and Franklin shoots him when he fires at Conejo. Conejo sees Lucia in Cardenas's car as he flees.
19	9	"Aftermath"	Sunu Gonera	Story by : Emmy Grinwis; Teleplay by : Sal Calleros	September 13, 2018	XNF02009	0.855
While the Calis force Matt to do large amounts of cocaine, Avi busts into the house to get his money. Teddy arrives with the money from his office to pay Avi and the Calis, but Matt is left in poor health. The CIA shuts down the investigation into Teddy and Matt, redirecting the DEA towards the Calis. Marino releases Lucia and Gustavo, but Cardenas refuses to give up her pursuit and approaches Teddy. Lucia is attacked by Conejo, believing her to be responsible for the attack, but Gustavo fights him off and is badly wounded. Detectives inform Cissy and Andre that Franklin is wanted for Kevin's shooting and Cissy blames Jerome, who argues that all of the adults Franklin grew up with are to blame. Leon returns home to find that Wanda has escaped, while Jerome and Louie offer to send Franklin away after learning Cardenas saw Kevin bleed to death. Franklin takes the offer and goes home, promising Cissy that when he returns, he will give up selling for her. Having suspected Franklin would go to Cissy, Andre calls the police and they arrest Franklin as Cissy promises she loves him.
20	10	"Education"	John Singleton	Dave Andron	September 20, 2018	XNF02010	0.783
Cardenas identifies Franklin as Kevin's killer and he is sent to a county jail. At his arraignment, he is denied bail and transferred to a detention facility. Ray-Ray, also in the facility, beats him. Leon visits and encourages him to "show them who the fuck you is." After Alton visits him and tries to offer advice, an enraged Franklin rejects him and beats up an inmate who stole his shoes. When he is released from solitary confinement, he gets Ray-Ray to leave him alone by threatening his family. Teddy explains what he does to Cardenas and convinces her that the war on drugs is futile. He persuades her to join him until the Contras win their war, promising to then hand over everyone he did business with. Franklin has Louie ask Teddy to get Cardenas to recant her statement, which she reluctantly does. Upon his release, Franklin pays Avi a large sum to get back in his good graces and meets with Teddy at Kevin's grave, claiming his mistake was that he gave Kevin too much power and that he needs to be stricter. He and Teddy confirm they are back in business, and later, Franklin realizes Teddy is a government agent.

=== Season 3 (2019) ===
No. overall	No. in season	Title	Directed by	Written by	Original release date	Prod. code	U.S. viewers (millions)
21	1	"Protect and Swerve"	Dan Attias	Dave Andron	July 10, 2019	XNF03001	0.997
Five months later, Cissy tries to get into the real estate market by bidding on an apartment. Three Crips try to rob a Family distribution truck but two are killed by Leon and Family man Thaddeus "Fatback" Barber. Their leader Drew "Manboy" Miller offers to buy and distribute Family crack. Leon hunts down the third robber and kills him. Teddy's new supplier, Medellín Cartel head Rigo Vasco, asks for help opening a nightclub. Matt has a heart attack and Teddy takes him back to Robert's home in Kansas City. Robert rejects his money and blames him for Matt's condition. He tracks Gustavo to Tucson and asks him to help move cocaine, as it might get him closer to finding the missing Lucia. Jerome's new store is ransacked and Louie learns that Claudia was responsible. Instead of telling him, she goes to Claudia, who asks her to inject her with crack while she is bathing. She later returns to Jerome in distress. Disturbed by crack damaging his neighborhood, Andre confronts Franklin, who offers to hire him. When Franklin claims he does not care about crack's effects, Andre vows to destroy him.
22	2	"The More You Make"	Tanya Hamilton	Leonard Chang	July 17, 2019	XNF03002	0.698
Claudia is found dead in her bathtub and Andre arrests Louie. He tries to coax her into confessing to the death, but jumps the gun by claiming the crime had a witness, leading her to realize he is bluffing. Her lawyer frees her, and Andre tells his captain about the recent outbreak of crack. Manboy buys crack from Franklin, who discusses offshore banking with Avi. Gustavo and Teddy meet with Lucia's mother Mariela, who agrees to help them move cocaine. Gustavo stays to negotiate payment and explains that Lucia vanished after treating the wounds he sustained fighting Conejo. The Sandinistas hijack shipments of weapons to the Contras, so Julia, now divorced from Teddy, decides to help him run guns. Franklin holds a Family meeting and asks them to start giving cocaine to a handful of distributors, as he plans to start directly selling only to a few high-level clients.
23	3	"Cash and Carry"	Alonso Alvarez	Walter Mosley	July 24, 2019	XNF03003	0.696
Avi takes Franklin to Panama City so he can deposit his money. He seduces a local woman and finds that Avi is stalling on depositing, so he has her send his money to a different bank. He gets Avi to admit that he is being blackmailed by the Israeli government and cannot pay the Panamanians, so he was trying to borrow from Franklin. Franklin warns him to be direct and gives him a loan with interest. Teddy and Julia go to Costa Rica to meet with a Contra leader, who requests that they drink drug-laced tea as part of a ritual. They comply and have sex under its influence. Leon discovers that Wanda is having sex with Manboy and his men for crack when he goes to drop off cocaine, starting a fight. Louie makes the drop for him, but orders Manboy to get rid of Wanda after she mocks Claudia's death. Manboy kicks Wanda out and almost kills her when she insults him. Gustavo and Mariela's cocaine truck breaks down, and she kidnaps a police officer so they can use his vehicle to jumpstart theirs, who Gustavo spares against Mariela's orders. Upon arriving at Teddy's drop point, they find that he has sent Cardenas to pick up the drugs, and Gustavo kills her.
24	4	"The Game That Moves As You Play"	Logan Kibens	Story by : Gary Phillips & Natalia Mejia; Teleplay by : Gary Phillps & Natalia Mejia & Dave Andron	July 31, 2019	XNF03004	0.758
Teddy and Gustavo dissolve Cardenas's body with chemicals. Someone outbids Cissy on the apartment. Andre's testimony mobilizes the LAPD to raid several Family houses, including Jerome's, and Andre watches as officers nearly kill him when he fights back. Franklin has Leon kill the supervisor of a raided house when the man blames him for the raids. Gustavo offers to buy a house in San Ysidro for Hernan and his family. Melody begs Franklin to stop selling for his and his family's safety. When she blames Jerome for his own beating and Louie nearly attacks her, Franklin angrily orders her to leave.
25	5	"The Bottoms"	Michael Lehmann	Enzo Mileti & Scott Wilson	August 7, 2019	XNF03005	0.827
Franklin has Louie's sister seduce Andre and steal his gun and badge. He has Manboy set up a meeting with Bloods leader Terrence "Skully" Brown, the husband of Manboy's sister Khadijah, so he can move cocaine in Inglewood. They meet him at Bloods stronghold "The Bottom", and he agrees to distribute. Cissy learns that her old boss was the one who outbid her, and he sends men to her house when she and Franklin try to convince him to let it go. Franklin beats them up and leaves them in the man's ransacked office, who drops the bid. Vasco refuses to continue selling until Teddy gets him his club. After internal affairs brings up the complaints lodged against Andre about the raids and Louie's arrest, the LAPD suspends him. He asks his colleague Henry "Nix" Nixon to find out where Franklin lives.
26	6	"Confessions"	Erin Feeley	Tash Gray	August 14, 2019	XNF03006	0.819
Alton learns that Franklin is working with Teddy and warns him with a story about his Black Panther cousin that was killed by the FBI. Franklin orders Avi to find information on Teddy and deduces from that he is with the CIA. He learns conflicting information about Alton's cousin and confronts him, who admits that he killed him after the FBI outed him as an informant to save him from Black Panther torture. Gustavo buys another house for Hernan in Tijuana. His wife Nuvia tells Gustavo that her abusive ex-husband Ivan threatened her when he learned she was moving. Teddy and Julia get Vasco the club. Nix fails to find anything on Franklin, and when Andre tries to follow him, he is pulled over by white police officers because he does not have his badge. Suspecting that Cardenas is dead and unaware that Julia and Teddy are together, Marino asks her to investigate him, leaving her horrified when she finds out what happened to Cardenas. Melody agrees to leave town and go to college, but is pressured into trying crack at a party.
27	7	"Pocket Full of Rocks"	Alonso Alvarez	Justin Hillian	August 21, 2019	XNF03007	0.982
Melody steals money from her college fund and takes Andre's car to buy more crack. She encounters Wanda, who helps her buy cheap, but the car is stolen. After they run out of crack, Wanda steals the necklace that Melody's mother gave her, so Melody beats her and takes it back. Gustavo kills Ivan. Julia posits her and Teddy taking their son and leaving since the Contras are now well-supplied. After finding his car and realizing Melody's fund is light, Andre asks Franklin for help finding her. He orders Fatback to put out word that anyone who sees Melody should call him. Young Family man C.J. tells him and Leon that he saw Melody with Wanda, which is a dead end. Franklin gets a call and finds Melody in a crack house, having lost the necklace, and takes her home.
28	8	"Hedgehogs"	Carl Seaton	Emmy Grinwis	August 28, 2019	XNF03008	1.035
Franklin catches Melody buying crack and tries to stop her, but gives up when she knees him in the groin. Manboy's lieutenant Bootsy gets in a fight with Leon over territory. When Teddy refuses to leave the operation, Julia gives Andre Franklin's address and he steals his file on Teddy, discovering that the CIA is funding the cocaine trade. Learning from his man in the DEA that Marino named him as a connection to the Villanuevas, Vasco almost kills Teddy until he tells him his real occupation, offering to bring him in as a CIA asset. Realizing that someone is trying to take down his suppliers and Franklin, Teddy calls them and Avi is shot at as he flees his house. Teddy realizes that Julia is responsible and confronts her, and she admits that she wants the operation to end for his safety. Disgusted, he promises to destroy her career. Realizing that Andre broke in, Franklin goes to his house with his stolen gun. Andre agrees to help move Melody out of town but promises to come back. Franklin kills him, stages it as a suicide, and takes the file back.
29	9	"Blackout"	Ben Younger	Story by : Leonard Chang; Teleplay by : Leonard Chang & Walter Mosley	September 4, 2019	XNF03009	0.945
Melody discovers her bedroom window, the way Franklin always entered her house, is unlocked. She tells Nix that Franklin killed Andre, but Franklin hires him when confronted. Manboy demands Franklin lowers the price of cocaine if he continues to protect Leon. Franklin refuses, but later berates Leon for his recklessness. Avi explains to Teddy that he sold weapons on the black market that ended up in the hands of the IRGC and he has been paying Israel since, but Julia's exposure of him made them decide to kill him. Teddy asks Havemeyer to get Mossad off of Avi and finalize Vasco as an asset, then meets with Franklin, sympathizing with his guilt and promising that they will be partnered until the operation ends. He ignores Julia when she begs him to come with her and does cocaine after she leaves. Gustavo introduces him to Hernan and Nuvia, explaining that they are digging a tunnel under the border that will come out in the San Ysidro house. Franklin follows Melody from Andre's reception to her house, where she shoots him.
30	10	"Other Lives"	Sunu Gonera	Dave Andron	September 11, 2019	XNF03010	1.044
Franklin is enrolled in Claremont McKenna College, Alton has been killed by the police, and Louie and Jerome are having a baby. After attending a CIA recruitment seminar hosted by Teddy, Franklin is kicked out when the college's budget is cut under Reaganomics and he attacks his financial aid officer. As he helps Jerome bag marijuana and takes a job at a corner store, Teddy invites him to join the CIA. Karvel robs the corner store and Franklin is saved when Andre kills him. Cissy begs him to leave L.A., knowing he is too "big" for it, and he wakes up in the real world, having survived being shot with Alton tending to him for the past few months. War between the Bloods and Crips has broken out, and Manboy and his men kill several people at the Bottom. Franklin's parents try to stop him from getting back into selling, but he insists that his absence will leave a vacuum and the war will only escalate. Now walking with a cane, he meets with Teddy and finally acknowledges crack's destructive influence, but decides he is too far along to get out. He reveals he knows Teddy works for the CIA, then agrees to take on more cocaine and reminds him of the promise that they would be partners until the end.

=== Season 4 (2021) ===
No. overall	No. in season	Title	Directed by	Written by	Original release date	Prod. code	U.S. viewers (millions)
31	1	"Re-Entry"	Kevin Bray	Dave Andron	February 24, 2021	YSN401	0.707
On New Year's Eve, Franklin still has a birthday card Melody sent him. Herald Examiner reporter Irene Abe visits a now rehabilitated Melody at her aunt's house in Odessa for a piece on increasing L.A. crime. Teddy and Gustavo are arrested while moving cocaine in Tijuana and brought before new chief Oscar Fuentes, forcing them to negotiate a deal. Teddy learns that Avi's newest shipment of guns never arrived, and he partially deafens Avi's man Lior to press Avi into figuring it out. Franklin invites Teddy and Gustavo to a party at Louie's new club, where he reconnects with his ex-girlfriend Tanosse. Leon is enraged to see Gustavo, who he blames for Kevin's death, and storms out when Franklin protects him. With the gang war getting worse, Teddy advises Franklin to play both sides until he can choose a profitable victor. The Bloods crucify Bootsy and Franklin prepares for a fight. Alton tries to get Franklin to stay home, and though moved, Franklin leaves.
32	2	"Weight"	Karena Evans	Leonard Chang	February 24, 2021	YSN402	0.643
Franklin sides with the Crips and they ambush Skully, starting a gunfight. Skully is shot but survives. Franklin asks Nix to arrest the Bloods involved in the shootout, but when he arrives at the Bottom, he observes the amount of firepower and believes Franklin set him up to be killed. Irene visits Alton at the homeless shelter he runs, but he refuses to talk. Short on cocaine, Leon refuses to do business with Gustavo and instead has C.J. set him and Fatback up with a gang. The gang tries to rob them and they narrowly escape, though Leon is still determined to do business without Franklin. Gustavo, Hernan and Teddy offer to double their payment they made to the previous chief for Fuentes, but he demands twenty times it, which Teddy refuses. Gustavo later finds Hernan and Nuvia killed by Fuentes's men.
33	3	"All the Way Down"	Ugla Hauksdóttir	Walter Mosley	March 3, 2021	YSN403	0.706
Teddy contacts the DFS to stop Gustavo from charging Fuentes's police station, and reveals his real name and occupation to him, having worked under an alias. They get Fuentes's killing sanctioned by the DFS, so Gustavo kills one of his men and he flees to his compound. Teddy massacres Fuentes's men and Gustavo strangles him when he tries to flee. Cissy has Franklin buy a local bookstore and sell it to real estate giant Paul Davis to help him with a building project. Nix tries to blackmail Franklin with Andre's murder, but Franklin points out that he is complicit. Nix beats Cissy in front of Andre's grave and tells her that Franklin killed him, so Franklin has Davis get him demoted. Irene meets with one of the detectives that investigated Kevin's death and learns that the files on it have vanished. He warns that Cardenas, the only witness, went missing, and gives Irene Marino's name.
34	4	"Expansion"	Greg Yaitanes	Hiram Martinez	March 10, 2021	YSN404	0.600
Wanda is shot while saving Leon from a Bloods shooting. He hires a man to follow Skully and learns that he regularly visits his grandmother. Avi informs Teddy that the money he gave him for the guns was transferred, but Teddy asks Havemeyer to look into Avi's bank deposits to be sure. Franklin agrees to take double the cocaine from Teddy in hopes of helping the Contras win to end his service. Nuvia's sister Xiamara, now taking care of her orphaned children, refuses Gustavo's money, but he leaves it for her anyway and departs. Alton stops an altercation between shelter regular John Baxter and his son. Marino gives Irene evidence of the CIA's involvement in the drug trade. Leon and his men wait outside Skully's grandmother's house when a car full of Bloods drives by. A gunfight erupts that kills C.J., and Leon unintentionally kills Skully's young daughter Tianna.
35	5	"The Get Back"	Logan Kibbens	Justin Hillian	March 17, 2021	YSN405	0.683
Franklin hides Leon in one of Cissy's apartments. Haunted by guilt and receiving no support from his mother or Franklin, Leon is comforted by Cissy. A drunken Gustavo is arrested when he breaks into Xiamara's house to see their nephews. Teddy frees him and he promises to clean up if he finds out what happened to Lucia. Irene interviews an imprisoned Diego and Danilo, who agree to talk after learning that Teddy sold them out. Impressed, her boss agrees to back the story and advises her to look for a weak link in the Family. Manboy makes peace with a devastated Skully and Khadijah because of their familial connection, promising to help kill Leon. When Leon's identity as the shooter is made public, Louie suggests that Franklin kill him. Believing Franklin intends on this, Leon flees and Skully pursues him, and he is narrowly saved by Jerome and Franklin. Manboy tells Franklin that the Crips no longer work with the Family.
36	6	"Say a Little Prayer"	Logan Kibbens	Dave Andron & Ihuoma Ofordire	March 24, 2021	YSN406	0.775
Robert informs Teddy that Matt died of a heart attack two weeks prior and the funeral was held without him. Havemeyer confirms that Avi did not steal from Teddy. Wanda is forcibly sobered up in the hospital and calls Leon for help, who points her towards Alton's shelter. Leon and Franklin convince Fatback to testify that C.J. killed Tianna. Fatback is arrested for his involvement in the shooting, and before he can be bailed out, Khadijah abducts and kills him when he refuses to give up Leon. Louie and Jerome go to Little Rock, where they teach her childhood friend how to cook crack. Irene again visits Alton and gives him an ultimatum: agree to interview with her, or she will go after his family and the shelter.
37	7	"Through a Glass, Darkly"	Alonso Alvarez	Leonard Chang & Jeanine C. Daniels	March 31, 2021	YSN407	0.608
Teddy and Avi learn that a Panama City bank employee stole Teddy's money. Paranoid from his cocaine use and believing the man is some kind of agent, Teddy waterboards him. Leon, working with Franklin again, fumbles a meeting with Fatback's Crip cousin Deon. Jerome persuades him to work with the Family, and a Crip saves Leon's life when a woman tries to collect a bounty Khadijah put out on him. Alton finds Baxter dead of a crack overdose outside the shelter. After learning that Baxter's children will likely end up in foster care, he agrees to Irene's terms and tells her everything he knows about Teddy. Cissy suspects something is wrong and alerts Franklin, and Alton admits what he did when confronted. Alton states that the black community cannot survive the spread of crack, and Franklin hits him when he accuses him of killing his own people.
38	8	"Betrayal"	Alonso Alvarez	Walter Mosley & Tyger Williams	April 7, 2021	YSN408	0.676
Teddy goes to Nicaragua to meet with Elena, only to find her and several of her comrades killed by the Sandinistas. The sole survivor informs him that he arrived too late to help them, and he gives her money before leaving. He breaks into Irene's house and threatens her after the article releases. Cissy refuses Alton's pleas to flee to Havana with him. She informs Franklin that Davis is cutting ties with them because of the article. Khadijah tasks bounty hunters Beverly "Black Diamond" Young and Dallas Ali with killing Leon at Fatback's funeral. They miss and shoot Louie in the process. Believing Manboy to be responsible, Jerome plots revenge against Franklin's orders. Manboy orders Tanosse, who has been feeding him information for her imprisoned brother's safety, to find out who Franklin gets his cocaine from. Franklin suspects something is off when she suggests that he introduce Manboy to Teddy, and confronts her on her connection to Manboy.
39	9	"Sleeping Dogs"	Carl Seaton	Justin Hillian	April 14, 2021	YSN409	0.802
Tanosse explains that Manboy threatened her into finding Franklin's supplier, which is the reason she approached him at the party. Franklin fights Jerome to stop him from attacking the Crips and has Tanosse explain that Khadijah was responsible for the shooting. She lures Manboy to her apartment and Franklin kills him. He hires Black Diamond and Dallas and they take Khadijah to Leon, who gives her the opportunity to let things go. Jerome kills her when she refuses. Irene threatens to expose Teddy if the CIA does not acknowledge the article. Havemeyer pulls Teddy out of the operation, so he meets Irene at a bar and pretends to turn on the CIA, letting her record his recounting of the past year and a half. She passes out while driving from Teddy drugging her drink, and he suffocates her before taking the recording.
40	10	"Fight or Flight"	Carl Seaton	Dave Andron	April 21, 2021	YSN410	0.881
As a child, Franklin gets in trouble at school for refusing to stand for the Pledge of Allegiance. Alton, who encouraged him not to, pulls him out of school and tells him that he will always support his choices. In the present, Alton implicates Teddy for Irene's death on a radio show and promises to expose him. Franklin finds him at his house planning to kill Teddy, and a vengeful Skully breaks in and is shot before Alton flees. Skully goes to Louie's hospital room, who stalls him until Jerome returns and fights him off. Alton tries to threaten Teddy into cutting Franklin loose, only for Franklin and Cissy to arrive, the latter agreeing to take Alton away and never return. Despite this, Teddy follows Alton to Havana and kills him. Havemeyer gives Gustavo information that confirms Lucia lives safely in Miami. Louie and Jerome inform Franklin that they plan to start their own trade and buy cocaine from him. Franklin visits Melody and promises to kill her if she talks to anyone about him again. She promises to never do so if he admits to killing Andre. He nods, sets his cane down, and walks away without limping.

=== Season 5 (2022) ===
No. overall	No. in season	Title	Directed by	Written by	Original release date	Prod. code	U.S. viewers (millions)
41	1	"Comets"	Ben Younger	Dave Andron & Leonard Chang	February 23, 2022	YSN501	0.793
Fourteen months later, Boston Celtics draft pick Len Bias dies from a cocaine overdose. Teddy learns that Franklin has a new CIA contact in agent Grady Williamson. One of Rob's dealers kills a man at a party over a line of cocaine. Franklin tasks Wanda with helping an addicted Rob sober up, but later catches him trying to sneak out. Franklin forces him to kill his dealer, who brings up Franklin's connection to the CIA while begging for his life, and they take his body out to the desert to bury it. Franklin thinks about an earlier promise he made to his pregnant girlfriend Veronique Turner to keep their family safe from his criminal life, and kills Rob upon realizing he cannot be trusted. He later asks Veronique to swear her loyalty, as others have betrayed his trust in the past, and she does.
42	2	"Commitment"	Ben Younger	Leonard Chang & Dave Andron	February 23, 2022	YSN502	0.556
A couple months prior, Teddy learns from Avi that Williamson is doing a poor job, doing real estate business with Franklin and taking some of the Contras' money for himself. Havemeyer allows Teddy to take back the operation, but Williamson refuses to give it up, so Teddy fatally poisons him. Wanda quits her job at a sex hotline when her boss underpays her and goes to Leon for a Family job, but he turns her down. Teddy informs Franklin that they are starting back up again and that he will be raising the prices back to what Williamson lowered them from. When Franklin refers to him as his alias, he tells him that he will be doing business under his real name from now on.
43	3	"Lions"	Damian Marcano	Jeanine Daniels	March 2, 2022	YSN503	0.539
Teddy's refusal to keep the price low makes it harder for Louie and Jerome to sell to the Bloods. With Skully increasingly unstable, his lieutenant offers to buy cocaine at a higher price if they help kill him. Louie and Jerome ambush him and return to his lieutenant, only to reveal that they struck a deal with Skully, who kills him. Franklin makes Wanda his new secretary at his real estate agency. He meets with Teddy, who denies having anything to do with Alton's disappearance when asked and states that the price cut was only an issue because Williamson was selling to Jerome and Louie as well as Franklin. At his next deal with Gustavo, Franklin suspects that Teddy is listening in on them, confirming it when he finds the vantage point Teddy spied on them from. He meets with Louie and Jerome and asks them to come back to the Family so they can fix Teddy's pricing, and warns them to stay out of his way when they turn him down.
44	4	"Revolutions"	Damian Marcano	Tyger Williams & Gary Phillips	March 9, 2022	YSN504	0.616
Cissy returns from Havana. Over dinner with her family, she states her belief that Teddy killed Alton and asks to help Franklin with the Family. Jerome discovers that a local rapper is writing about the Family's war with the Bloods and Crips, forcefully taking all his tapes to prevent them from being used as evidence but later relistening to the parts that mention him, troubled by his depiction. The area Leon controls is raided by a CRASH team and Louie's police officer Beau Buckley. Avi and Cissy warn him against retaliation, and he asks Franklin why they never use their wealth to help their community. Cissy meets with a man named Rubén and confirms that Franklin is working with Teddy again. She promises to help him and the people he works for kill Teddy in exchange for confirmation that Teddy killed Alton.
45	5	"The Iliad: Part 1"	Kevin Rodney Sullivan	Sal Calleros & Davia Carter	March 16, 2022	YSN505	0.545
Franklin asks Veronique and Cissy to sit down with Jerome and Louie to talk investments. Rubén gives Cissy a listening device hidden in a pen to bug Franklin with. While Franklin does a deal with Teddy and Gustavo, they are attacked by a group of men and Franklin escapes with Gustavo. Teddy is shot and drives to the house of his surgeon associate Parissa, who removes the bullet. While calling Jerome for help, Franklin overhears him and the women get shot at by another group. They are detained when the police arrive, but Louie rescues them by getting Buckley to free them. Leon and his men are shot at while dealing with Avi. Franklin and Gustavo are attacked by a local gang and break into the house of an elderly man named James to use his phone, but he catches and tranquilizes them. They wake up in a cage next to one with Gertie, James's pet tiger, inside.
46	6	"The Iliad: Part 2"	Kevin Rodney Sullivan	Sal Calleros & Davia Carter	March 23, 2022	YSN506	0.688
Gustavo kicks James's leg into the tiger cage when he tries to feed them to the tiger, where Gertie kills him by tearing it off while Franklin grabs the dropped keys and escapes. They are caught by the gang and Franklin takes them back to James's house, where they are killed by Gertie and he steals their car. He rescues Gustavo from the rest of the gang, while he finds that one of his safe houses was robbed and suspects the absent Peaches's involvement. After Cissy warns her of the danger Franklin's business will bring her and their child, Veronique requests that Franklin not be involved with her romantically until he leaves the drug trade. Black Diamond and Dallas inform the Family that Kevin's older brother Kane, recently released from prison, was responsible for the attacks. Franklin meets with Kane, who indirectly confirms Peaches's involvement. Franklin warns him he will let things slide but will not give him another chance.
47	7	"Lying in a Hammock"	Carl Seaton	Leonard Chang	March 30, 2022	YSN507	0.639
To prevent war, Leon convinces Kane that Kevin's death was an accident and that moving cocaine for the Family would be a lucrative opportunity. Franklin is furious to learn what Cissy said to Veronique and orders her to stay out of the Family's business. She considers bugging his office but decides against it. While Teddy and Parissa have sex, Havemeyer sets him up with accountant William Cox. Looking for Peaches in a VA hospital, Jerome meets a friend of his who takes him to a crack house that Peaches frequented, leaving Jerome shocked that he was an addict. The man claims Peaches announced his plan to help Kane and then flee. He later proposes to Louie, who accepts. Still angry at Kane, she organizes a hit on him with Buckley.
48	8	"Celebration"	Katrelle Kindred	Walter Mosley	April 6, 2022	YSN508	0.636
Louie strikes a deal with Teddy to start buying cocaine from him. He breaks into Franklin's house and photographs financial documents. Rubén attends Louie and Jerome's wedding disguised as a waiter. After the ceremony where Franklin is the best man, Skully spikes the chocolate fountain with LSD. Franklin is confronted by Cissy on his greed and hallucinates Rob and Veronique berating him for his failures. He sees a vision of himself that confronts him on the controlling murderer he has become, taunting him with the idea that everyone will turn on him, though Franklin is adamant he can keep the Family together. Cissy accuses Rubén of drugging them and reveals he is with the KGB. After a talk with Avi, Leon decides to vacation in Africa and Wanda rejects his invitation. Louie and Jerome affirm their love for each other and she admits that she killed Claudia. As the drugs wear off, she and Franklin dance and she states she needs to follow her own path.
49	9	"Departures"	Karena Evans	Dave Andron	April 13, 2022	YSN509	0.509
Buckley shoots Kane in the back but is stopped from finishing him off when Kane's men kill his partner. Buckley is suspended and Louie hires him full time. Having taken note of Avi at the wedding, Rubén breaks into one of his warehouses and abducts him. Franklin tells Veronique about hallucinating her while on LSD and admits he is thinking of leaving the drug trade. Wanda and Leon admit that they still love each other. Louie informs Franklin of the deal she made with Teddy. He tells Teddy that their partnership is over due to the deal made behind his back.
50	10	"Fault Lines"	Alonso Alvarez	Dave Andron	April 20, 2022	YSN510	0.592
Franklin decides he is out of the drug trade and suggests to Veronique that they get married. With the Anti-Drug Abuse Act of 1986 being passed through Congress as a result of Bias's death, Leon plans to retire and unsuccessfully tries to get his men to leave as well. He and Wanda leave for Africa. Xiamara finds a listening device in her house and calls Gustavo, who convinces her to take their nephews and leave with him. He goes to retrieve his money but is caught by the DEA. Franklin's entire fortune is stolen by Teddy, who gives Havemeyer some of Franklin's money so he can be brought back into the CIA. He has Parissa drive him to Avi's to retrieve the files on him, only for Rubén to get them first. He notices Parissa as he leaves, and Teddy emerges to find her gone. Rubén kills Avi when he admits that he lied about Teddy's rank in the CIA to stall for time. Franklin pulls a gun on Louie when she refuses to help him catch Teddy. Buckley disarms him and Louie agrees to let him live for Jerome, but tells him that their relationship is over. Franklin takes Black Diamond and Dallas to rob Louie and Jerome's spots, then informs Kane that Louie was responsible for his shooting. He points out to Cissy that he tried to deal with Louie fairly and gives her the chance to leave. She admits that she is dealing with the KGB now and wants to help kill Teddy.

=== Season 6 (2023) ===
No. overall	No. in season	Title	Directed by	Written by	Original release date	Prod. code	U.S. viewers (millions)
51	1	"Fallout"	Ben Younger	Dave Andron	February 22, 2023	YSN601	0.608
The family of a guard killed in the robberies find his body at the crime scene. Franklin offers to sell Deon cocaine for cheaper than Louie and Jerome. Now a DEA informant, Gustavo visits Marino, the one who bugged him. Teddy learns that Lior has taken over Avi's business, who refuses to deal with him. Havemeyer tells him that he needs to tie up loose ends to come back to the CIA, and he later finds Parissa in a police station's cell. Jerome finally manages to contact Franklin, who refuses to return the money. Deon refuses to do business with Jerome, but tells him where Black Diamond and Dallas are dropping his cocaine. Jerome pulls them over and asks them where Franklin hid his money, brutalizing Black Diamond when they cannot answer. He tells Dallas to pass along the warning that he will not stop until he gets his money back.
52	2	"The Sit Down"	Ben Younger	Jeanine Daniels and Dave Andron	February 22, 2023	YSN602	0.438
A flashback reveals that Parissa escaped from Rubén but was arrested. Teddy has a sketch artist draw Rubén from Parissa's memory, and Gustavo realizes he is the waiter from Louie and Jerome's wedding. He later shows Marino the border tunnel. Black Diamond dies from her injuries and Dallas retires. Cissy sets up a meeting between Franklin and Rubén, where they agree to expose the CIA. Rubén's handler informs him that the KGB is getting their Sandinista contacts to intercept Avi's last gun shipment. Gustavo meets with Franklin, who offers him Rubén's name in exchange for Teddy. Veronique sets Franklin up with her con woman mother Cassandra, who agrees to help get his money back for the ability to be part of Veronique's life again. Jerome sits down with Franklin and expresses disappointment in the way Franklin turned out. When Franklin insults Louie, Jerome hits him and Franklin pulls a gun but leaves, unable to kill his uncle.
53	3	"Door of No Return"	Alonso Alvarez	Walter Mosley	March 1, 2023	YSN603	0.464
Now in Accra, Leon learns about the history of Africans selling their own as slaves and makes a connection between it and selling crack to his community. He vows to use his wealth to help his people, and he and Wanda get married. They return to L.A. to find that the Saint feud has become a war, with Kane and Deon also getting involved. Cassandra tracks down Cox. Rubén follows Gustavo and observes a meeting with Marino. Teddy and Gustavo travel to Costa Rica and hire mercenaries to help them kill the Sandinistas. Teddy discovers a note in Russian hidden amongst their belongings and realizes the KGB is attacking the operation. Leon tries to broker peace with Louie and Jerome but is ignored. He meets with Franklin, who warns him to either pick a side or take Wanda back to Accra.
54	4	"Projects Boy"	Alonso Alvarez	Sal Calleros	March 8, 2023	YSN604	0.450
Cassandra lures Cox out of his office and Veronique photographs Teddy's files. They learn that only Teddy knows where the money was transferred, so Franklin sends the Turners to Kansas City. He inspects Kane's cook houses when they underperform, and when Todd, a house manager, talks back, Franklin burns his face on a stove. When Kane will not let him take revenge, Todd goes to Louie and Jerome, who sanction a hit on Kane. He and his men attack Kane's house, but he and Franklin kill them. Gustavo is met by Rubén at a bar, who offers money and an escape from if he helps get Teddy and Havemeyer arrested. Teddy watches Rubén as he leaves. Leon is unnerved by the decay of his old neighborhood, brought on by Deon. When he catches Deon shooting out streetlights he had repaired, they fight and Leon wins after a brutal struggle.
55	5	"Ebony and Ivory"	Jade Holmes Christian	Davia Carter	March 15, 2023	YSN605	0.502
While staking out Robert's nursing home, Cassandra advises Veronique to leave Franklin. Cassandra poses as a home resident and seduces Robert, taking him to his old house, where he admits that he wishes he could have fixed things with Teddy before Matt died. Leon reluctantly takes Deon's place as boss to keep the neighborhood stable. Troubled by the lack of code and honor he sees around him, Jerome visits an old friend. While there, he believes someone is following and pulls his gun in a panic, and the friend asks him to leave. Gustavo admits to Xiamara that he is working with the DEA while warning Teddy of his encounter with Rubén, causing him to hide the cocaine and ruin a DEA raid. Franklin goes to Robert's house with Veronique and calls Teddy from his phone, demanding that he return his money. When he refuses, Franklin kills Robert and burns the house down.
56	6	"Concrete Jungle"	Katrelle Kindred	Dave Andron and Jeanine Daniels & Davon Briggs	March 22, 2023	YSN606	0.590
Teddy calls Julia to warn her about Franklin and visits Rubén, offering him an out but making it clear that he will kill him if he continues. He later posits the idea of fleeing with Parissa. Horrified by Robert's murder, Cassandra leaves, but Veronique refuses to go with her because of Franklin's wealth. Marino ponders sending Gustavo to jail, forcing him to work against Teddy with Franklin. A drunken Jerome tells Louie he plans to quit and accuses her of enjoying their dangerous life. Louie is kidnapped by Kane's men, where he has her tortured for Buckley's location. After she promises Franklin that she will help catch Teddy, he agrees to help save her with Jerome. Jerome pages Buckley for help, but he is occupied with getting high. He and Franklin sneak into Kane's compound and open the gate, where they and the Bloods massacre Kane's men. Jerome and Kane face off. With Jerome refusing to let Kane escape, they shoot and kill each other.
57	7	"Charnel House"	Logan Kibens	Walter Mosley	March 29, 2023	YSN607	0.552
A depressed Louie asks Skully how he dealt with his grief after losing his family, and he admits he is still grieving, but believes their spirits are with him. Julia advises Teddy to return the money for their safety. He refuses, and she accuses him of destroying his family in an attempt to impress Robert with his escapades. He demands that Louie help him capture Franklin, which she agrees to do after Jerome's funeral. Rubén visits Gustavo at his home and orders him to plant cocaine in Teddy's warehouse to get him arrested. When Xiamara enters, Rubén quietly threatens her and leaves. Gustavo admits to Franklin that he is working with the DEA, but promises to help him with Teddy if he can get his family out. Cissy gives Wanda control of Alton's shelter. At Jerome's funeral, Buckley claims that Jerome did not call him for help when Louie was kidnapped. Franklin meets Louie at the coffin and reminds her of her promise. She tells him that "you are the Devil," and he sighs "yeah, I know."
58	8	"Ballad of the Bear"	Amin Joseph	Sal Calleros	April 5, 2023	YSN608	0.592
Unable to transfer Franklin's money because of his attempts to get it back, Teddy accepts that he cannot return to the CIA and proposes to Parissa. Xiamara and her nephews leave without telling Gustavo their location. He goes with one of Marino's agents to pick up the cocaine but is arrested when Marino discovers that Xiamara is gone. Rubén runs Marino's car off the road and kills his agent, freeing Gustavo and ordering him to take him to Teddy. Franklin has Louie hand him over to Teddy, who takes him to his warehouse and suspends him in a noose to keep him in place. Gustavo and Rubén arrive, the latter restraining Teddy. Knowing that siding with Franklin will benefit him the most, Gustavo attacks Rubén, knocking the bucket keeping Franklin from strangling over in the process. He narrowly saves Franklin's life, leaving Teddy at Franklin's mercy.
59	9	"Sacrifice"	Ben Younger	Dave Andron	April 12, 2023	YSN609	0.601
Louie's house is raided by the DEA and she is rescued by Buckley. Suspecting that he lied to her, she forces him at gunpoint to confirm he missed Jerome's call and takes his car. Franklin takes Rubén and Teddy to a stash house and sees Gustavo off as he leaves for Mexico. Teddy claims to Cissy that he had Alton arrested and can take her to him. When Veronique warns Franklin that they are soon going to lose one of their properties, she helps him torture Teddy. Franklin asks why he stole from him, and Teddy reveals that he only did it because he was hurt Franklin stopped doing business with him, and they agree to split the money evenly. Franklin agrees to give Havemeyer Rubén and Teddy. Enraged that he is letting Teddy go, Cissy insists on accompanying him to the drop but promises Franklin that they will never speak again afterwards. They meet at a payphone and Teddy calls his bank, snapping at Cissy that he killed Alton when she bugs him for details. She shoots and kills him before he can give the bank his password, surrendering to the police as Franklin flees the scene.
60	10	"The Struggle"	Alonso Alvarez	Dave Andron	April 19, 2023	YSN610	0.694
Franklin gives Rubén to Havemeyer to keep him from going to federal prison. He tries to threaten Leon for a loan, but he refuses, believing that Cissy killed Teddy to save Franklin from the destructive influence of the money. Cissy pleads guilty to Teddy's murder and is given a life sentence without parole. She refuses to speak to Franklin and advises Leon to go back to Accra with Wanda. Franklin threatens Veronique when she tries to sell the downtown property behind his back, so she runs away with his remaining money. He begs Cissy to sell her house so he could get some income and tells her he wishes Teddy killed her when she refuses to speak. Three months later, Franklin tracks down Peaches and kills him. He hides the body and calls a locksmith to get his safe open, but is interrupted by Peaches' friend arriving, who he kills in front of the man. After finding that almost all of the stolen Family money is gone, he lets the locksmith have the rest and lets him go, but changes his mind and kills him. Two years later, Marino is hunting Louie, who was taken in by ranchers as a hired hand, while Gustavo works as a wrestling teacher in Mexico and is contacted by Xiamara, who invites him to see their family in North Carolina. Another year later, Leon returns to South Central to start a legal clinic and finds that Franklin is now a rambling alcoholic living in Cissy's dilapidated house. Franklin mentions that Veronique called him once to say she gave birth to their child, but refused to tell him where they were. Leon offers to give Franklin a job at the clinic, but Franklin turns him down. As the police prepare to seize his home for unpaid property tax, Franklin rejects Leon's offer to help, declaring that he is now "free from all of it." He tells Leon he is proud of him and walks away, ignoring a weeping Leon calling his name. The episode is dedicated to series creator John Singleton, who died in 2019.

== Broadcast ==
Outside of the United States, Snowfall premiered on BBC Two in the United Kingdom on October 8, 2017. It is also available for view on BBC iPlayer.

== Reception ==
=== Critical response ===
On Rotten Tomatoes, the first season has an approval rating of 62% based on 63 reviews, with an average rating of 6.2/10. The site's critical consensus for the first season reads, "Snowfall struggles to create a compelling drama from its separate storylines, despite Singleton's accurate recreation of 1983 Los Angeles and a strong lead performance from Damson Idris." On Metacritic, the series has a score of 63 out of 100, based on 47 critics, indicating "generally favorable reviews". A 100% approval rating for the second season was reported by Rotten Tomatoes, with an average rating of 7/10 based on 7 reviews. A 100% approval rating for the third season was reported by Rotten Tomatoes with an average rating of 9/10 based on 5 reviews.

Matt Zoller Seitz of Vulture called Snowfall a clever constructed thriller that reaches the "standard Scorsese/Tarantino", praising "the attention it pays to the sights, sounds and textures of people's lives in 1983 Los Angeles, and to fine details of characterization — in other words, the sort of stuff that would never get a dramatic series a green light unless drugs and violence were attached to it." He further stated, "Rather than go for a vibe like The Wire or Steven Soderbergh's Traffic, which explored the drug trade with a newspaperman's anthropological detachment, Snowfall aims for a bouncier, more seductive vibe." Seitz also praised the "phenomenal" acting of Idris, Peris-Mencheta, Hudson, and Rios. James Poniewozik of The New York Times praised the performances of the actors, found the series emotional, and complimented its story. Brian Tallerico of RogerEbert.com found the series narratively ambitious and applauded the performances of the cast members, stating the actors represent the show's greatest asset, writing, "Idris is a fantastic find, conveying a combination of intelligence and innocence that makes Franklin's arc feel genuine. [...] Rios is even better as a more-experienced player in the drug game who has yet to lose her hope for something bigger. Finally, McDonald vacillates in fascinating ways from a pencil pusher to someone willing to do whatever it takes to redeem his legacy as an agent."

Ed Power of The Telegraph rated the series 4 out of 5 stars, saying, "It's slick and breezy – far too enamoured with its roguish characters to do justice to a cathartic chapter in the history of modern Los Angeles. But the show has a giddy energy and, amid the blizzard of gangster clichés, Idris shines brightly as star in the making." Melissa Camacho of Common Sense Media rated the series 3 out of 5 stars, writing, "Snowfall is a dark and gritty series about the crack cocaine trade and that it is intended for adults. [...] The characters are complex and live by ambiguous codes, but most seek personal gains by buying/selling drugs. Those old enough to handle it will find a series that's complex and intelligent, but sometimes hard to watch.

Alan Sepinwall of Uproxx gave a mixed review of the series, criticizing the show's clichéd storytelling and pacing; the latter he observed, "oddly feels sluggish and rushed at the same time, lingering over certain tasks and story beats... but then oddly jumping over story points in a way that had me frequently checking to be sure I hadn't skipped an episode by mistake." He further emphasized: "Snowfall's not a bad drama at this stage, just more generic than it should be, especially on a channel known for making old TV ideas feel brand-new."

=== Historical accuracy ===
Snowfall is set during the crack epidemic of the 1980s, when the use of crack cocaine rapidly picked up in the United States and affected impoverished neighborhoods, with it having the most harmful ramifications in African American communities. A key plotline in the series involves the CIA fostering the crack epidemic through cocaine trafficking to raise money for the Contras in Nicaragua. This is based on Gary Webb's controversial 1996 investigative series in the San Jose Mercury News and its follow-up book Dark Alliance: The CIA, the Contras, and the Crack Cocaine Explosion. According to executive producer Dave Andron, the show's writers worked with the premise that Webb's reporting was factual; however, he acknowledged that he did not "think there was any conspiracy to bring crack to the inner city or destroy a people." Patricia A. Turner, a dean of the UCLA College who studies folklore and conspiracies theories related to Black culture, said the idea that the CIA introduced crack cocaine to Black communities is a conspiracy theory that has persisted since the 1980s. Webb wrote that the crack epidemic was more of an unintended effect and that he "never believed, and never wrote, that there was a grand CIA conspiracy behind the crack plague [...] The CIA couldn't even mine a harbor without getting its trench coat stuck in its fly."

=== Ratings ===
Snowfall : U.S. viewers per episode (thousands)

Season	Episode number										Average
Season	1	2	3	4	5	6	7	8	9	10	Average
1	1361	965	1045	1003	1010	845	814	847	914	854	966
2	1163	888	930	975	923	822	815	752	855	783	891
3	997	698	696	758	827	819	982	1035	945	1044	880
4	707	643	706	600	683	775	608	676	802	881	708
5	793	556	539	616	545	688	639	636	509	592	611
6	608	438	464	450	502	590	552	592	601	694	549

Audience measurement performed by Nielsen Media Research

==== Season 1 ====
Viewership and ratings per episode of Snowfall
No.	Title	Air date	Rating (18–49)	Viewers (millions)	DVR (18–49)	DVR viewers (millions)	Total (18–49)	Total viewers (millions)
1	"Pilot"	July 5, 2017	0.6	1.36	—N/a	—N/a	—N/a	—N/a
2	"Make Them Birds Fly"	July 12, 2017	0.4	0.965	0.5	1.01	0.9	1.98
3	"Slow Hand"	July 19, 2017	0.5	1.05	0.5	1.10	1.0	2.15
4	"Trauma"	July 26, 2017	0.4	1.00	—N/a	—N/a	—N/a	—N/a
5	"seven-four"	August 2, 2017	0.4	1.01	0.5	0.97	0.9	1.98
6	"A Long Time Coming"	August 9, 2017	0.4	0.845	0.5	1.04	0.9	1.88
7	"Cracking"	August 16, 2017	0.4	0.814	0.5	1.14	0.9	1.96
8	"Baby Teeth"	August 23, 2017	0.4	0.847	0.5	1.03	0.9	1.88
9	"Story of a Scar"	August 30, 2017	0.4	0.914	0.6	1.10	1.0	2.02
10	"The Rubicon"	September 6, 2017	0.4	0.854	—N/a	—N/a	—N/a	—N/a

==== Season 2 ====
Viewership and ratings per episode of Snowfall
No.	Title	Air date	Rating (18–49)	Viewers (millions)	DVR (18–49)	DVR viewers (millions)	Total (18–49)	Total viewers (millions)
1	"Sightlines"	July 19, 2018	0.5	1.16	0.5	1.26	1.0	2.43
2	"The Day"	July 26, 2018	0.4	0.888	0.5	1.09	0.9	1.98
3	"Prometheus Rising"	August 2, 2018	0.4	0.930	0.4	0.84	0.8	1.77 (Note: Live +7 ratings were not available, so Live +3 ratings have been used instead.)
4	"Jingle Bell Rock"	August 9, 2018	0.4	0.975	0.4	0.83	0.8	1.81
5	"Serpiente"	August 16, 2018	0.4	0.923	0.5	1.10	0.9	2.03
6	"The Offer"	August 23, 2018	0.4	0.822	0.3	0.82	0.7	1.64
7	"The World Is Yours"	August 30, 2018	0.4	0.815	0.4	1.04	0.8	1.86
8	"Surrender"	September 6, 2018	0.3	0.752	0.5	1.10	0.8	1.86
9	"Aftermath"	September 13, 2018	0.4	0.855	0.4	1.01	0.8	1.87
10	"Education"	September 20, 2018	0.3	0.783	0.4	0.84	0.7	1.63

==== Season 3 ====
Viewership and ratings per episode of Snowfall
No.	Title	Air date	Rating (18–49)	Viewers (millions)	DVR (18–49)	DVR viewers (millions)	Total (18–49)	Total viewers (millions)
1	"Protect and Swerve"	July 10, 2019	0.4	0.997	0.4	1.03	0.8	2.03
2	"The More You Make"	July 17, 2019	0.3	0.698	0.4	1.08	0.7	1.78
3	"Cash and Carry"	July 24, 2019	0.3	0.696	0.4	1.06	0.7	1.76
4	"The Game That Moves As You Play"	July 31, 2019	0.3	0.758	0.4	0.93	0.7	1.69
5	"The Bottoms"	August 7, 2019	0.3	0.827	0.4	1.00	0.7	1.83
6	"Confessions"	August 14, 2019	0.4	0.819	0.4	1.17	0.8	2.00
7	"Pocket Full of Rocks"	August 21, 2019	0.4	0.982	0.3	0.87	0.7	1.85
8	"Hedgehogs"	August 28, 2019	0.4	1.035	0.4	1.01	0.8	2.04
9	"Blackout"	September 4, 2019	0.4	0.945	0.5	1.01	0.9	1.95
10	"Other Lives"	September 11, 2019	0.4	1.044	0.4	0.91	0.8	1.95

==== Season 4 ====
Viewership and ratings per episode of Snowfall
No.	Title	Air date	Rating (18–49)	Viewers (millions)	DVR (18–49)	DVR viewers (millions)	Total (18–49)	Total viewers (millions)
1	"Re-Entry"	February 24, 2021	0.3	0.707	0.4	0.82	0.7	1.53
2	"Weight"	February 24, 2021	0.3	0.643	0.4	—N/a	0.7	—N/a
3	"All the Way Down"	March 3, 2021	0.3	0.706	0.3	—N/a	0.6	—N/a
4	"Expansion"	March 10, 2021	0.3	0.600	—N/a	—N/a	—N/a	—N/a
5	"The Get Back"	March 17, 2021	0.3	0.683	—N/a	—N/a	—N/a	—N/a
6	"Say a Little Prayer"	March 24, 2021	0.3	0.775	—N/a	—N/a	—N/a	—N/a
7	"Through a Glass, Darkly"	March 31, 2021	0.3	0.608	—N/a	—N/a	—N/a	—N/a
8	"Betrayal"	April 7, 2021	0.3	0.676	—N/a	—N/a	—N/a	—N/a
9	"Sleeping Dogs"	April 14, 2021	0.4	0.802	—N/a	—N/a	—N/a	—N/a
10	"Fight or Flight"	April 21, 2021	0.4	0.881	—N/a	—N/a	—N/a	—N/a

=== Accolades ===
Award	Year	Category	Nominee(s)	Result	Ref.
African-American Film Critics Association	2017	Top 10 TV Shows	Snowfall	Won	
American Society of Cinematographers	2022	Outstanding Achievement in Cinematography in Episode of a One-Hour Series for Commercial Television	Tommy Maddox-Upshaw	Won	
American Society of Cinematographers	2023	Outstanding Achievement in Cinematography in Episode of a One-Hour Series for Commercial Television	Christian Tico Herrera	Nominated	
BET Awards	2021	Best Actor	Damson Idris	Nominated	
Black Reel Awards for Television	2021	Outstanding Drama Series	Dave Andron	Nominated	
Black Reel Awards for Television	2021	Outstanding Actor, Drama Series	Damson Idris	Nominated	
Black Reel Awards for Television	2021	Outstanding Supporting Actor, Drama Series	Amin Joseph	Nominated	
Black Reel Awards for Television	2021	Outstanding Supporting Actress, Drama Series	Michael Hyatt	Nominated	
Black Reel Awards for Television	2021	Outstanding Directing, Drama Series	Carl Seaton	Nominated	
Black Reel Awards for Television	2021	Outstanding Writing, Drama Series	Justin Hillian	Nominated	
Black Reel Awards for Television	2021	Outstanding Guest Actress, Drama Series	Gail Bean	Nominated	
Black Reel Awards for Television	2022	Outstanding Actor, Drama Series	Damson Idris	Nominated	
Black Reel Awards for Television	2022	Outstanding Writing, Drama Series	Walter Mosley	Nominated	
Black Reel Awards for Television	2023	Outstanding Drama Series	Dave Andron	Won	
Black Reel Awards for Television	2023	Outstanding Lead Performance in a Drama Series	Damson Idris	Won	
Black Reel Awards for Television	2023	Outstanding Supporting Performance in a Drama Series	Amin Joseph	Nominated	
Black Reel Awards for Television	2023	Outstanding Supporting Performance in a Drama Series	Angela Lewis	Nominated	
Black Reel Awards for Television	2023	Outstanding Guest Performance in a Drama Series	DeVaughn Nixon	Nominated	
Black Reel Awards for Television	2023	Outstanding Writing, Drama Series	Walter Mosley (for "Charnel House")	Nominated	
Black Reel Awards for Television	2023	Outstanding Writing, Drama Series	Jeanine Daniels and Dave Andron (for "The Sit Down")	Nominated	
Black Reel Awards for Television	2023	Outstanding Directing in a Drama Series	Amin Joseph (for "Ballad of the Bear")	Nominated	
California On Location Awards	2017	Location Manager of the Year - One Hour Television	Brian M. O'Neill	Won	
California On Location Awards	2017	Location Team of the Year - One Hour Television	Tisha Jefferson, Alex R. Moreno, William O'Brien, Caitlin McCarty, Justin W. Hill	Won	
Imagen Foundation Awards	2018	Best Actor - Television	Sergio Peris-Mencheta	Nominated	
Imagen Foundation Awards	2023	Best Director - Television	Alonso Alvarez	Nominated	
NAACP Image Awards	2020	Outstanding Directing in a Drama Series	Carl H. Seaton	Nominated	
NAACP Image Awards	2023	Outstanding Supporting Actor in a Drama Series	Amin Joseph	Nominated	
NAACP Image Awards	2024	Outstanding Drama Series	Snowfall	Nominated	
NAACP Image Awards	2024	Outstanding Actor in a Drama Series	Damson Idris	Won	
NAACP Image Awards	2024	Outstanding Supporting Actor in a Drama Series	Amin Joseph	Nominated	
NAACP Image Awards	2024	Outstanding Supporting Actress in a Drama Series	Gail Bean	Won	
NAACP Image Awards	2024	Outstanding Directing in a Drama Series	Alonso Alvarez–Barreda	Nominated	
NAACP Image Awards	2024	Outstanding Directing in a Drama Series	Amin Joseph	Nominated	
Society of Camera Operators	2022	Camera Operator of the Year in Television	Manolo Rojas, Pauline Edwards	Won	

== Spin-off ==
In March 2023, a spin-off series, starring Gail Bean, reprising her role as Wanda Bell-Simmons, was reported to be in early development. After having been in development in two years, the series was given a pilot order by FX in March 2025, with Isaiah John set to co-star with Bean and reprise his role as Leon Simmons. In November 2025, Malcolm Spellman was set as lead writer and executive producer on the spinoff, after it was ordered to series. Asante Blackk, Peyton Alex Smith, and Simmie Sims III were also confirmed to have joined the main cast alongside Bean and John. In March 2026, Isidora Goreshter, Mykelti Williamson, Brandon Mychal Smith, Nicki Micheaux, Eric Balfour, Richard Portnow, Zaire Adams, and Demetrius Grosse were announced to have joined the cast, with Quincy Chad also confirmed to reprise his role as Deon "Big D" Barber. In June 2026, the title was revealed as The Drop: A Snowfall Saga. The series premiered on September 8, 2026, on FX and FX on Hulu.
