= The Drop: A Snowfall Saga =

American crime drama television series

- Genre: Crime drama; Musical drama
- Created by: Malcolm Spellman
- Based on: Snowfall by John Singleton; Eric Amadio; Dave Andron
- Starring: Gail Bean; Isaiah John; Asante Blackk; Peyton Alex Smith; Simmie "Buddy" Sims III
- Opening theme: "LA Theme Song" by Nipsey Hussle
- Country of origin: United States
- Original language: English
- No. of seasons: 1
- No. of episodes: 8

Production
- Executive producers: Malcolm Spellman; Dave Andron; Thomas Schlamme; Julie DeJoie; Michael London; Trevor Engelson; Paul Garnes; Ben Younger
- Producers: Evan Silverberg; Eric Amadio; Amy Myrold
- Production companies: The 51; Shoe Money Productions; Dave & Ron Productions; Groundswell Productions; Underground Films; FX Productions

Original release
- Network: FX
- Release: September 8, 2026 – present

Related
- Snowfall

The Drop: A Snowfall Saga is an American musical crime drama television series created by Malcolm Spellman for FX. A spin-off and sequel to Snowfall, it premiered on September 8, 2026, and follows Wanda Bell (Gail Bean) and Leon Simmons (Isaiah John), attempting to reinvent themselves in the West Coast hip hop scene of early 1990s Los Angeles.

The series was put into development in 2023 as Snowfall concluded its six-season run, received a pilot order in March 2025, and was ordered to series by FX in November 2025. Its title was announced in June 2026. The first season consists of eight episodes, released weekly on FX and Hulu, with international distribution on Disney+.

== Premise ==
Set in Los Angeles 1990, roughly four years after the events of Snowfall, the series follows Wanda Bell, a recovering crack cocaine addict who is determined to help take West Coast rap mainstream, and her husband Leon Simmons. Wanda stakes her ambitions on her younger cousin Lamar Kinsey and on Artillery, a volatile local rapper, while gang warfare escalates in South Los Angeles and record labels move to profit from hip hop culture.

== Cast and characters ==
=== Main ===
- Gail Bean as Wanda Bell, a recovering addict pursuing a career in the music industry
  - Alaiya Sales as Young Wanda
- Isaiah John as Leon Simmons, Wanda's husband
- Asante Blackk as Lamar Kinsey, Wanda's 19-year-old cousin and an aspiring artist
  - Avery Anozie as Young Lamar
- Peyton Alex Smith as James Kinsey, Lamar's older brother, who is gang affiliated
  - Arlo Felix as Young James
- Simmie "Buddy" Sims III as Arthur "Artillery" Coleman, a local rapper affiliated with the Bloods

=== Supporting ===
- Mykelti Williamson as James "Big Daddy" Kinsey, a laundromat owner and the brothers' grandfather
  - Kalyl Silva as Young "Big Daddy"
- Nicki Micheaux as Gerty Kinsey, the brothers' grandmother
  - Ivi Gasaway as Young Gerty
- Brandon Mychal Smith as Darryl "DG" Grant, a record label owner
- Eric Balfour as Leonard Vance, DG's lawyer
- Zaire Adams as Andy, Lamar’s best friend and engineer
- Isidora Goreshter as Jenny Favarella, a major record label called Macroscope collaborating with DG
- Aleyse Shannon as Dara Johnson, Artillery's aunt and de-facto leader of the Bloods
- Hanad Abdi as Keith "K-Rock" Benoist, Artillery's over-protective friend
- Demetrius Grosse as Herbert Dean, a police officer friendly to Leon
- James Landry Hébert as Dean's volatile partner who beat Artillery up
- DeMario "Symba" Driver as Tip-Toe, Artillery's friend and fellow rapper
- Quincy Chad as Deon "Big D" Barber, reprising his role from Snowfall
- Paul Ben-Victor as Enzo, Jenny's supervisor on the board of the record label
- Rico E. Anderson as Cornelius Rayburn, DG's head of security
- Aaron "DJ Hed" Drake as DJ Block, a gangsta rap DJ and owner of another record label
- Denée Benton as Rochelle, Lamar and James' mother who is an aspiring musician
- Zach Sowers as Maurice, Rochelle's abusive manager, later husband and father to Lamar and James

== Episodes ==
No.	Title	Directed by	Written by	Original release date	U.S. viewers (millions)
1	"Click Pop"	Ben Younger	Malcolm Spellman	September 8, 2026	0.22
In Los Angeles in 1990, a sober Wanda Bell sells used cars in Compton while interning for Darryl "DG" Grant, a former gangster turned record executive. She persuades DG and executive Jenny Favarella to pursue Artillery, a volatile local rapper whose music helped her through recovery, and the wary Artillery gives her one week to bring him a song. Wanda's 19-year-old cousin Lamar Kinsey has been skipping school to make beats, frustrating his older brother James and their grandparents Big Daddy and Gerty, who want him to take a steady job. Wanda visits Leon Simmons, from whom she has separated, who now runs a free legal clinic and warns her against pulling Lamar into a dangerous industry. After Lamar tells his family he wants to pursue music, Wanda has him build a track around a sample. Meanwhile, police brutally beat Artillery, and Wanda's demand to become DG's partner ends in a physical fight. Wanda hears that Artillery has died, but learns the report was false. James drives Wanda and Lamar into Blood territory, where Lamar plays his beat at a house party and Artillery begins rapping over it.
2	"Street Matrix"	Alonso Alvarez	Nichelle Tramble Spellman	September 15, 2026	N/A
Jenny offers to partner with DG's label, Black Banner, and suggests making Wanda head of A&R, which DG accepts on the condition that she signs Artillery. Gerty, who has not forgotten Wanda's addiction, objects to Lamar's involvement, and James throws Artillery out of the house after finding him recording with Lamar, reminding his brother that they live in a Crip neighborhood and Artillery is a Blood. Leon, struggling to fund appeals at his clinic, declines to review Wanda's contract but is glad to see her find a direction. When DG meets Artillery to close the deal, he insults Dara, who represents the rapper, and her crew beat and strip him. The furious DG threatens retaliation until Leon talks him down. Leon and Wanda then meet Dara and the Bloods in Compton, where Leon convinces Dara that the music business can earn her more than intimidation, and Wanda offers her the role of Artillery's manager. The truce holds with Leon's backing, but he warns Wanda never to put him in that position again. James is angered to learn Lamar has signed his contract, and DG secretly calls in a dangerous enforcer known as the Wolf.
3	"Family Matters"	Millicent Shelton	Sal Calleros	September 22, 2026	0.25
Artillery becomes a wanted man after releasing a song about a slain officer, and escapes another police stop while selling drugs on a Compton corner. Needing a verse for his new track, Lamar goes looking for him in Crip territory with Wanda and Dara, but finds the rapper more concerned with staying alive than meeting a deadline. One of Artillery's associates strikes Lamar, James knocks the man out, and a police raid ends with both brothers arrested. Leonard Vance posts bail and Leon drives them home, where James reveals that Wanda arranged a record deal and that Lamar signed it. Big Daddy is furious, and Gerty, still carrying the memory of what the music business did to the brothers' mother, accuses Wanda of steering Lamar toward the same fate. At Macroscope, Jenny struggles to convince her colleagues that rap is worth investing in, and when Wanda pushes Lamar's record forward without his full agreement, Jenny tells her she has ruined the opportunity. DG, meanwhile, goes behind Leon's back and contacts the Wolf, threatening the peace Leon brokered.
4	"The Big Push"	Seith Mann	Eli Dansky & Rance Ward	September 29, 2026	0.18
Jenny is reprimanded by her father for overspending and for sending Artillery's single "Rydah" to radio, and the record is pulled from the air. With Macroscope's owner looking to sell the company, Wanda's group is boxed in, so she falls back on the street distribution model Franklin and Leon once used for crack, moving the music hand to hand instead. Gerty struggles with Lamar's move into music, and James urges her to listen to his brother's record, but she refuses and Big Daddy tells him to stay out of it. Wanda visits Leon while he is drinking alone, and the hour reveals that the couple lost a baby girl, explaining the distance between them; Leon believes Wanda placed her ambition above their marriage. The episode ends with Lamar's first night in the club scene at the Last King, where Wanda again works around a gatekeeper. The win gives her proof that her instincts about Artillery and the streets were right, even as the people closest to her keep paying for how she wins.
5	"Homecoming"	Darren Grant	Safura Fadavi	October 6, 2026	N/A
Hoping to end Lamar's music career, Gerty and Big Daddy call a family meeting and tell him the truth about his parents. Flashbacks to a Pentecostal church in Los Angeles in 1950 show a 15-year-old Gerty pregnant, establishing the history she has spent decades burying. Lamar and James had been told only that their mother, Rochelle, was a musician and that both parents died in a hit and run. Lamar instead learns that Rochelle married his father, Maurice, when she was 16 and he was 26, and that she died following a violent confrontation with him. He also discovers that the family photographs he has treasured for years were staged over a single weekend because he had missed his mother so badly as a child. Gerty and Big Daddy had kept the story secret in the belief that it would keep Lamar away from the industry that destroyed Rochelle, but the revelation has the opposite effect. Lamar tells them he is not his mother and leaves to pursue music on his own terms.
6	"Exit Wounds"	Rashidi Natara Harper	Michael Kastelein	October 13, 2026	0.20
Nearly a month after the album Back 2 Da Hood reaches the scene, Artillery tells DJ Block in an interview that they are still waiting on new music from Lamar, who has not finished a song in three weeks. At a label meeting, Jenny proposes bringing in a roster of producers to ease the pressure, which only discourages him further. Artillery and his crew survive a daylight drive-by, and Dara confronts DG, who placates her with an advance against future earnings. DG presses Leon about how he moved so many copies of the album; Leon offers to review his contracts and warns James that DG has his artists tied up in them. Artillery dismisses Lamar's new work and the two clash before Lamar walks out, after which James admits why he hid the truth about their mother. A night out tagging with Andy revives Lamar's creativity, and he returns with an album concept built around rebirth, rebranding himself as Nex. Wanda backs his vision over Jenny's producer list. In the closing scene, Deon kills Keith for robbing DG and openly wearing his stolen watch.
7	"Blood In, Blood Out"	Tiffany Johnson	Lex Edness & Emil Pinnock	October 20, 2026	0.30
Leon is reviewing recording contracts with Dara when a page from Artillery brings word that Keith has been killed. The murder pushes South Central toward retaliation, and Dara urges Artillery to make records repping the neighborhood, but he refuses to write anything that will fuel more killing, having already traded his Blood red for brown in an effort to step away from gang life. Dara's father orders a fellow Blood to stand down after he threatens Artillery. Detectives visit Leon's legal clinic as part of the investigation, and Leon, who knows DG ordered the killing, asks Dara to use her family's influence to stop the revenge without telling her why. At the label, DG blames Wanda for bringing Leon, Dara, Lamar and their street ties into his operation, and moves to split Lamar from Artillery, hand production to Tip-Toe and force out both Lamar and Wanda. Having lost her position, Wanda tells Dara that DG killed Keith and that Leon knew, exposing his secret and destroying Dara's trust in him.
8	"Hercules"	Alonso Alvarez	Lex Edness & Christine Macedo	October 27, 2026	TBD
DG celebrates the album's completion and then fires Wanda, refusing to let her take Lamar and Artillery with her. Lamar, recovering from a beating and wearing a sling, apologizes to James and makes peace with Big Daddy and the rest of the family. Wanda approaches a rival distributor and allies with Dara, then has Lamar talk his way into DG's office and let James in through a rear entrance so the brothers can steal the album's master recordings. Holding the masters, she confronts DG, who smashes a glass into her head in front of Jenny; Jenny ends Macroscope's partnership with Black Banner and fires him. DG and Deon corner Dara in an alley, but Leon shoots Deon and hands DG over to the Bloods. Leon's deception about Keith has cost him Dara, and after Wanda refuses to acknowledge the damage she has caused, he shuts her out, then takes a gun and leaves his clinic the next morning. Blackballed by Macroscope, Wanda walks away alone as Lamar sits down to a family dinner.

== Production ==
=== Development ===
A Snowfall spin-off entered early development at FX in March 2023, as the parent series approached the end of its sixth and final season. Malcolm Spellman was attached to write and executive produce, with Snowfall producers Dave Andron, Thomas Schlamme, Julie DeJoie, Michael London and Trevor Engelson also executive producing, and original series co-creators John Singleton (posthumously) and Eric Amadio expected to receive credit.

FX ordered a pilot in March 2025, with Gail Bean and Isaiah John set to reprise their roles. The network picked up the project to series in November 2025 for a premiere in 2026 on FX and Hulu. Nick Grad, president of FX Entertainment, said the series returns to a formative era in music and cited Spellman's previous work with the network on the documentary series Hip Hop Uncovered. The title The Drop: A Snowfall Saga was announced on June 2, 2026.

The series' opening theme, "LA Theme Song", is a posthumous Nipsey Hussle release. It was originally recorded as part of his 2018 single "Dedication".

=== Casting ===
Bean and John were attached from the project's earliest stages, reprising the roles of Wanda Bell and Leon Simmons. Asante Blackk, Peyton Alex Smith and rapper Simmie "Buddy" Sims III were announced as series regulars alongside them at the time of the series order. When the title was revealed in June 2026, FX confirmed that Mykelti Williamson, Nicki Micheaux, Brandon Mychal Smith, Isidora Goreshter, Eric Balfour, Richard Portnow, Zaire Adams and Demetrius Grosse had joined the cast, with Snowfall alum Quincy Chad returning as Deon "Big D" Barber.

== Release ==
The Drop: A Snowfall Saga premiered on FX and Hulu on September 8, 2026, with the remaining episodes of the eight-episode first season released weekly. The series is available internationally on Disney+, beginning September 9, 2026.

== Reception ==
On the review aggregator Rotten Tomatoes, the first season holds an approval rating of 100% based on 8 critic reviews, with an average of rated reviews of 8.4/10. On Metacritic, the season has a weighted average score of 74 out of 100 based on 6 critic reviews, indicating "generally favorable" reviews.

Kaiya Shunyata of RogerEbert.com gave the series a strongly positive review, writing that it stands apart from other spin-offs and describing Blackk's performance as Lamar as its center. Reviewing the series for Variety, Alison Herman found the world of the series vividly realized but judged its protagonists less compelling than the real-life figures of the era, and considered its emphasis on family conflict a distraction from the music-industry story. TheWrap noted that the series is necessarily different without Damson Idris at its center but concluded that it finds its own footing, singling out Blackk as a standout. Guy Howie of Screen Rant rated the series 7 out of 10 and praised its use of sound and music.
