= Isaiah John =

American actor (born 1995)

- John at the premiere of The Drop: A Snowfall Saga in 2026
- Born: 1995 (age 30–31); Atlanta, Georgia, U.S.
- Occupation: Actor
- Years active: 2013–present
- Known for: Snowfall; The Drop: A Snowfall Saga

Isaiah John (born 1995) is an American actor. He is best known for portraying Leon Simmons in the FX crime drama Snowfall (2017–2023), a role he reprised as a lead in its spin-off The Drop: A Snowfall Saga (2026–present). He also appeared in the Netflix film All Day and a Night (2020).

== Early life ==
John was born in 1995 and raised in Atlanta, Georgia. He has said that as children, he and his sister performed for their parents every weekend, but were too shy to perform in front of anyone else. Before his breakthrough, he worked as a janitor, a job he said he kept because its flexible hours allowed him to attend auditions.

== Career ==
=== Early roles ===
John made his screen debut in the 2013 film Standing Up. He went on to appear in small roles in the MTV series Finding Carter, the film Insurgent (2015), the Bounce TV series Saints & Sinners, and Barbershop: The Next Cut (2016). He and his sister Racquel played fraternal twins in the television film Downsized (2017).

=== Snowfall ===
John was cast as Leon Simmons, the best friend of Damson Idris's character Franklin Saint, in Snowfall, a drama about the crack epidemic in 1980s Los Angeles co-created by John Singleton. He was 20 years old and still working as a janitor when he booked the role, and later said he quit that job over the phone while he was in California. According to John, the scene he filmed on his first day on set was written into the pilot after his chemistry read with Idris, and he has described Singleton as a mentor who helped shape the character. Snowfall aired for six seasons on FX from 2017 to 2023, with John as a series regular throughout its run.

=== Film ===
In 2020, John co-starred with Ashton Sanders and Jeffrey Wright in the Netflix drama All Day and a Night, written and directed by Joe Robert Cole. He played TQ, the close friend of Sanders' character, who records the aspiring rapper's music.

=== The Drop: A Snowfall Saga ===
A Snowfall spin-off was first reported to be in development in 2023. In March 2025, FX ordered a pilot, with John and Gail Bean reprising their roles as Leon Simmons and Wanda Bell. The network ordered the project to series in November 2025, and FX Entertainment president Nick Grad singled out John's performance in the announcement. Titled The Drop: A Snowfall Saga, the series premiered on FX and Hulu on September 8, 2026.

== Filmography ==
=== Film ===
Year	Title	Role	Notes
2013	Standing Up	Summer camp kid	
2015	Insurgent	Amity citizen	
2016	Barbershop: The Next Cut	Gang member	
2020	All Day and a Night	TQ	

=== Television ===
Year	Title	Role	Notes
2014	Finding Carter	Partygoer	
2016	Saints & Sinners	Teen	
2017	Downsized	–	Television film
2017–2023	Snowfall	Leon Simmons	Main role
2026–present	The Drop: A Snowfall Saga	Leon Simmons	Main role
