= Angela Lewis =

American actress and philanthropist

- Born: July 14, 1988 (age 38); Detroit, Michigan
- Education: University of Michigan
- Occupation: Actress
- Known for: Snowfall
- Height: 168 cm (5 ft 6 in)
- Website: instagram.com/luvangelalewis

Angela Lewis (born July 14, 1988) is an American actress and philanthropist.

== Early life and education ==
Angela Lewis was born on July 14, 1988, in Detroit, Michigan, US She graduated with a Bachelor of Fine Arts degree from the University of Michigan.

== Career ==
Lewis has worked in theater and on television. She has appeared in The Big C, Law & Order: SVU, TNT's The Last Ship, CBS's Code Black, and FX's Snowfall, where she played "Aunt Louie".

== Other ventures ==
In addition to her acting career, Lewis co-founded BlüRemedi Media, a production company that aims to highlight diversity within diversity, alongside her husband. She also founded the non-profit organization Moon Child Collaborative, which focuses on social justice and community empowerment.

=== Philanthropy ===
In 2019 Lewis became a mother and was inspired to create Birth Village, a program under the Moon Child Collaborative umbrella. Birth Village aims to address the Black maternal health crisis by raising awareness, educating, and advocating for Black and Brown birthing people and their families.

== Personal life ==
Angela Lewis is married to J. Mallory Cree, and they have two children together. She resides with her family and continues to balance her acting career with her philanthropic endeavors.

== Filmography ==
=== Television ===
- Snowfall (FX) – Aunt Louie (series regular)
- Code Black (CBS) – Shanni Platt (guest star)
- The Last Ship (TNT) – Sarah (guest star)
- Law & Order: Special Victims Unit (NBC) – Rhonda Davis (guest star)
- The Big C (Showtime) – Chenise Jayes (guest star)
- The Good Wife (CBS) – Alexa (guest star)
- Let Them Die Like Lovers (TV movie) – Niecey (lead)
- Soft Focus (TV movie) – Café Barista (featured)
- Fair Game (TV movie) – (featured)
- Today's Special (TV movie) – (featured)
- The Ordained (Pilot) – Ophelia St. Ambrose (guest star)

=== Film ===
- Top Five (2014) – Flight Attendant

=== Theatre ===
- Don't Go Gentle (Yale Repertory Theatre)
- Good Goods (La Jolla Playhouse)
- Milk Like Sugar (World Premiere, La Jolla Playhouse) – Annie*
- The Brother/Sister Plays (Ensemble Studio Theatre) – Oya, Shaunta/Shun/Osha
- Hoodoo Love (World Premiere, Cherry Lane Theatre) – Toulou*
- Inked Baby (NY Public Theater) – Lena

== Awards and nominations ==
- AUDELCO Award Nominee – Best Lead Actress for Milk Like Sugar and Hoodoo Love
