= Unexpected (2015 film) =

- Theatrical release poster
- Directed by: Kris Swanberg
- Written by: Megan Mercier; Kris Swanberg
- Produced by: Andrea Roa; Chris Webber
- Starring: Cobie Smulders; Gail Bean; Anders Holm; Elizabeth McGovern
- Cinematography: Dagmar Weaver-Madsen
- Edited by: Zach Clark
- Music by: Keegan DeWitt
- Distributed by: The Film Arcade
- Release dates: January 25, 2015 (Sundance Film Festival); July 24, 2015 (United States)
- Running time: 90 minutes
- Country: United States
- Language: English

Unexpected is a 2015 American drama film directed by Kris Swanberg, and co-written by Swanberg and Megan Mercier. It stars Cobie Smulders as a teacher at an inner city Chicago high school who unintentionally becomes pregnant. One of her students, Jasmine (Gail Bean), is also unexpectedly pregnant, and the two bond through planning their futures. The film had its world premiere at the 2015 Sundance Film Festival on January 25, 2015. The film was released in a limited release and released video on demand on July 24, 2015, by The Film Arcade.

== Premise ==
An inner-city high school teacher develops an unlikely friendship with one of her most promising students while both struggle to navigate their unexpected pregnancies.

== Cast ==
- Cobie Smulders as Samantha Abbott
- Gail Bean as Jasmine
- Anders Holm as John
- Elizabeth McGovern as Mrs. Abbott, Samantha's mother

== Production ==
Swanberg took about two years to write the film's script. The film was shot in West Humboldt Park and East Garfield Park, Chicago, but takes place in Englewood. Cobie Smulders was pregnant during filming. The coinciding of Smulders' pregnancy with that of her character was not intentional. The film was completed in October 2014.

== Release ==
The film had its world premiere at the 2015 Sundance Film Festival on January 25, 2015. Shortly after it was announced, The Film Arcade had acquired distribution rights to the film. The film was released on July 24, 2015, in a limited release, and through video on demand.

== Reception ==
Unexpected was met with positive reviews. Film review aggregator website Rotten Tomatoes gives the film a 67% score, with an average rating of 6.4/10, based on reviews from 54 critics. The website's critical consensus reads, "Unexpected proves a thoughtful and well-acted — if somewhat mild — look at worthy, thought-provoking themes. On Metacritic, the film holds a weighted average rating of 65 out of 100, sampled from 20 film critics, indicating "generally favorable reviews".

== Accolades ==
List of awards and nominations
Award / Film festival	Category	Recipient(s) and nominee(s)	Result	Ref(s)
Sundance Film Festival	Grand Jury Prize - Dramatic	Kris Swanberg	Nominated	
