= Carter Hudson =

American actor

- Born: January 21; Shreveport, Louisiana, U.S.
- Education: Collin College
- Occupation: Actor
- Years active: 2009–present
- Known for: Snowfall
- Height: 6 ft 1 in (1.85 m)
- Spouse: Hollye Hudson

Carter Hudson is an American actor, born on January 21 in Shreveport, Louisiana. He is best known for starring on John Singleton's crime drama Snowfall, which debuted 5 July 2017 on FX and ended in 2023 after six seasons.

== Early life and education ==
Carter Hudson attended Collin College in Texas before transferring to the SUNY Purchase Conservatory of Theater Arts in New York, graduating in 2009. After graduating, Hudson began his career in theater, landing roles in several productions. Some of his notable early works include Honus and Me (2009) at Mountain Playhouse in Pennsylvania, The Chosen (2010) at Portland Center Stage in Oregon, The Effect (2012) by Lucy Prebble, and A Crime to Remember (2013).

== Career ==
Hudson gained recognition for his portrayal of Teddy McDonald, a CIA operative, in the FX series Snowfall, which premiered in 2017.

== Filmography ==
=== Television ===
- A Crime to Remember (2013)
- The Night Of (2016)
- Snowfall (2017) as Teddy McDonald
- The L Word: Generation Q (Showtime)
- The Wilds (2020)
- Dear Edward (2023)
- American Horror Story: Delicate (2023)

=== Film ===
- The Cherry Orchard (2016)
- Call Jane (2022)

=== Theatre ===
- Honus and Me (2009) at Mountain Playhouse in Pennsylvania
- The Chosen (2010) at Portland Center Stage in Oregon
- The Effect (2012) by Lucy Prebble
- Good Night, and Good Luck (2025), George Clooney's Broadway adaptation of his 2005 film of the same name.

=== Video games ===
Red Dead Redemption (voice role)

== Personal life ==
Carter Hudson has been married to actress Hollye Hudson (née Gilbert) since June 21, 2014.
