= Paradise Lost (2020 TV series) =

American TV series

- Genre: Drama; Mystery; Southern Gothic
- Created by: Rodes Fishburne
- Starring: Josh Hartnett; Bridget Regan; Barbara Hershey; Nick Nolte
- Composer: Paul Haslinger
- Country of origin: United States
- Original language: English
- No. of seasons: 1
- No. of episodes: 10

Production
- Executive producers: Arika Lisanne Mittman; Romeo Tirone; Rodes Fishburne
- Producers: Mac Marshall; David Kanter
- Cinematography: Alan Caso; Nicola Daley
- Editors: Robert Ivison; Josh Rifkin
- Production companies: Fishburne & Sons; Simon–Binx Productions; Anonymous Content; Spike Cable Networks, Inc.; Paramount Television Studios

Original release
- Network: Spectrum
- Release: April 13, 2020

Paradise Lost is an American television series created by Rodes Fishburne. It premiered on April 13, 2020, on Spectrum Originals. On July 30, 2020, lead cast member Josh Hartnett confirmed that the show will not be renewed for a second season.

== Premise ==
Yates Forsythe returns to his hometown in Mississippi with his psychiatrist wife Frances and their two children, only to uncover secrets that change the lives of everyone involved.

== Cast ==
- Josh Hartnett as Yates Forsythe
- Bridget Regan as Frances Forsythe, a psychiatrist and Yates's wife
- Nick Nolte as Judge Forsythe, Yates's father
- Barbara Hershey as Byrd Forsythe, Yates's mother
- Gail Bean as Gynnifer Green
- Danielle Deadwyler as Nicque Green
- Autry Haydon-Wilson as Janus Forsythe
- Elaine Hendrix as Devoe Shifflet
- John Marshall Jones as Uncle Ronny
- Shane McRae as Dickie Barrett
- Silas Weir Mitchell as Boyd Suttree
- Brett Rice as Uncle BB
- Lori Campbell as Nurse

== Episodes ==
No.	Title	Directed by	Written by	Original release date
1	Down the Rabbit Hole	John Lee Hancock	Rodes Fishburne	April 13, 2020
2	Them Damn Beetles from Japan	Romeo Tirone	Rodes Fishburne	April 13, 2020
3	Mississippi Ophelia	Neema Barnette	Mac Marshall	April 13, 2020
4	Ghost on the Tracks	Neema Barnette	John Romano	April 13, 2020
5	Danger to Yourself	Karen Moncrieff	Jada Nation	April 13, 2020
6	When There is No Wind, Row	Karen Moncrieff	Arika Lisanne Mittman	April 13, 2020
7	Polishing the Mirror	Elodie Keene	Cortney Norris	April 13, 2020
8	Getting to the Other Side	Elodie Keene	Mac Marshall and Jada Nation	April 13, 2020
9	The Black Dog Barked	Romeo Tirone	Arika Lisanne Mittman and Jada Nation	April 13, 2020
10	The Magnolia Curtain	Romeo Tirone	Rodes Fishburne	April 13, 2020

== Production ==
=== Casting ===
On June 11, 2019, it was announced that Josh Hartnett and Bridget Regan were to portray the lead characters of the show. In addition to Hartnett and Regan, actors Barbara Hershey, Nick Nolte, Gail Bean, Danielle Deadwyler and Shane McRae were cast in supporting roles. On December 16, 2019, it was announced that Matt Battaglia will appear in the series.

=== Filming ===
Principal photography occurred in Baton Rouge.

== Reception ==
Josh Bell of CBR gave the series a negative review and wrote, "The details of the mysteries in Spectrum's Paradise Lost are mostly unclear and the dialogue is full of portentous-sounding nonsense."
