= Love in the Time of Corona =

2020 American romantic comedy television miniseries

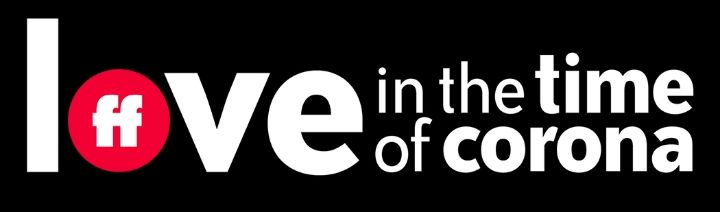
- Genre: Romantic comedy
- Created by: Joanna Johnson
- Starring: Ava Bellows; Gil Bellows; L. Scott Caldwell; Tommy Dorfman; Rya Kihlstedt; Leslie Odom Jr.; Rainey Qualley; Nicolette Robinson
- Music by: Amanda Jones
- Country of origin: United States
- Original language: English
- No. of episodes: 4

Production
- Executive producers: Joanna Johnson; Leslie Odom Jr.; Nicolette Robinson; Christine Sacani; Robyn Meisinger
- Producers: Resheida Brady; Gillian Sonnier
- Cinematography: Marco Fargnoli
- Editors: Geoff Saville; Adam Tiller
- Running time: 27–35 minutes
- Production companies: J.J. Prods; Anonymous Content

Original release
- Network: Freeform
- Release: August 22 – August 23, 2020

Love in the Time of Corona is an American romantic comedy television miniseries created by Joanna Johnson that premiered on Freeform on August 22, 2020. The title is a play on the title of the novel Love in the Time of Cholera. The series was removed from Hulu on May 26, 2023.

== Premise ==
Love in the Time of Corona follows lives of people who are looking for "love, sex and connection" during the COVID-19 pandemic while social distancing.

== Cast and characters ==
=== Main ===
- Ava Bellows as Sophie
- Gil Bellows as Paul
- L. Scott Caldwell as Nanda
- Tommy Dorfman as Oscar
- Rya Kihlstedt as Sarah
- Leslie Odom Jr. as James
- Rainey Qualley as Elle
- Nicolette Robinson as Sade

=== Recurring ===
- Emilio Garcia-Sanchez as Adam
- Jordan Gavaris as Sean
- Charlie Robinson as Charles
- Tyler Alvarez as Jordan
- Gail Bean as Adeah
- Catero Alan Colbert as Dedrick
- Chelsea Zhang as Kaia

== Episodes ==
No.	Title	Directed by	Written by	Original release date	U.S. viewers (millions)
1	"The Course of Love"	Joanna Johnson	Joanna Johnson	August 22, 2020	0.201
2	"#RelationshipGoals"	Joanna Johnson	Heather Flanders	August 22, 2020	0.137
3	"Seriously Now"	Joanna Johnson	Lauren Bans	August 23, 2020	0.217
4	"Love and Protest"	Joanna Johnson	Resheida Brady	August 23, 2020	0.134

== Production ==
=== Development ===
On May 7, 2020, it was reported that Freeform had given the production a straight-to-series order consisting of four parts. Love in the Time of Corona is executive produced by Joanna Johnson, Christine Sacani, and Robyn Meisinger. Anonymous Content is involved with producing the series.

=== Casting ===
On June 29, 2020, it was announced that Leslie Odom Jr., Nicolette Robinson, Tommy Dorfman, Rainey Qualley, Gil Bellows, Rya Kihlstedt, Ava Bellows, and L. Scott Caldwell were cast in starring roles.

=== Filming ===
Production began virtually on June 29, 2020, in Los Angeles using remote technologies. on Freeform on August 22, 2020.

== Release ==
The miniseries premiered on August 22, 2020, on Freeform in the United States. In selected international territories, the series is available on Disney+ under the dedicated streaming hub Star as an original series, since March 12, 2021. The series was removed from Disney+ on May 26, 2023.

== Reception ==
=== Critical response ===
On the review aggregator website Rotten Tomatoes, the series holds an approval rating of 58% based on 12 reviews. On Metacritic, the series holds a rating of 55 out of 100, based on 12 critics, indicating "mixed or average reviews".

=== Accolades ===
Love in the Time of Corona was one of the IMDbPro Top 200 Scripted TV Recipients for the ReFrame Stamp in 2021.
