= Gail Bean =

American actress

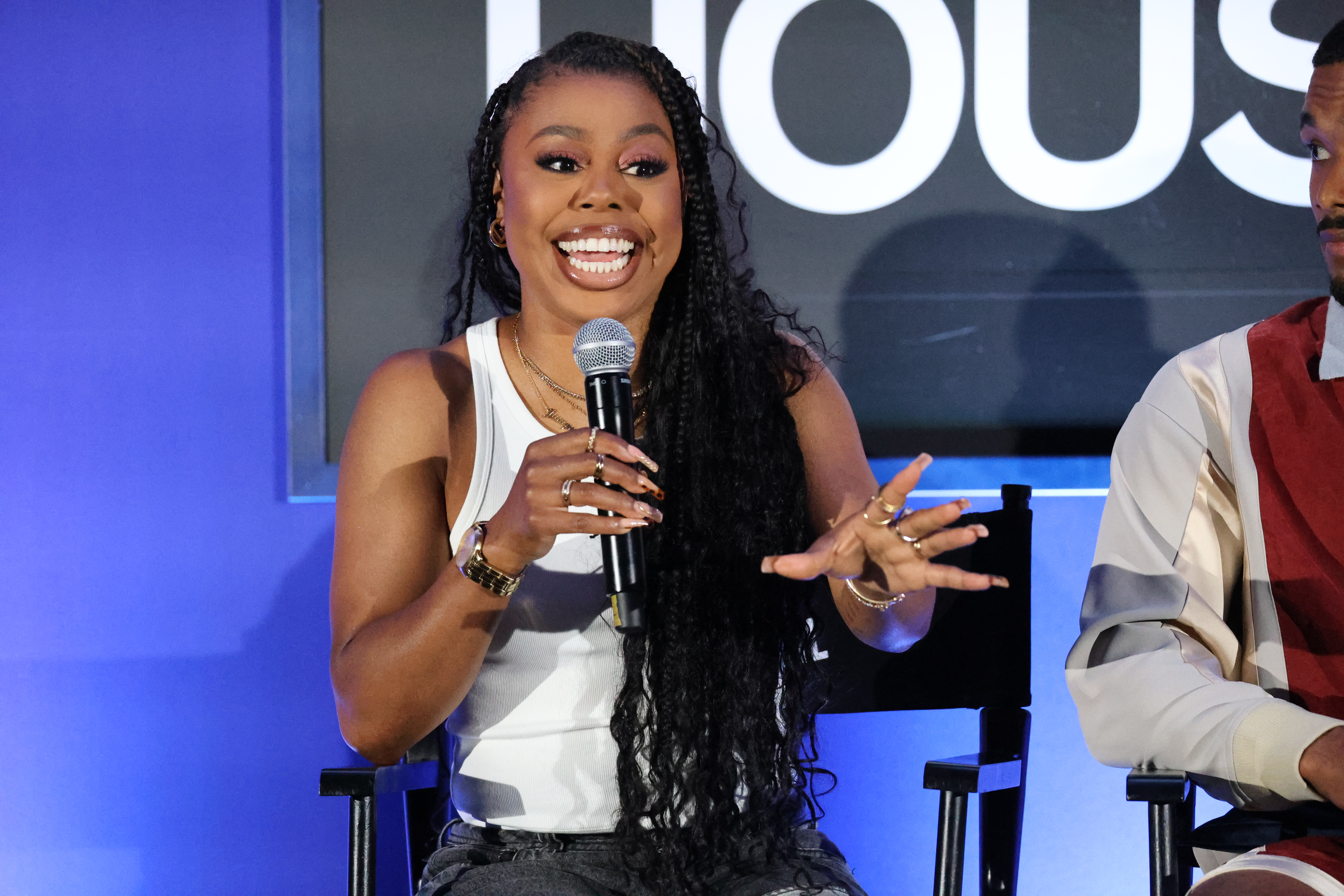
- Bean at Essence Fest 2025
- Born: Gail Mitchell; Stone Mountain, Georgia, U.S.
- Education: Valdosta State University
- Occupation: Actress
- Years active: 2011–present
- Known for: Snowfall

Gail Mitchell, known professionally as Gail Bean, is an American actress. Bean co-starred in the series Paradise Lost and the film Unexpected. She has also acted in Insecure, Love in the Time of Corona, Atlanta, and Detroiters. She is best known for her portrayal of Wanda Bell on Snowfall (2018–2023) and also the Spin-off The Drop: A Snowfall Saga (2026) . She is currently a main cast member on the Starz drama P-Valley.

== Life and career ==
Born Gail Mitchell, she was raised in Stone Mountain, Georgia. She is the youngest of six and the only daughter amongst her parents' children. Her father is NFL coach Stump Mitchell. She first became interested in acting in a drama class she took while she was a student at Stephenson High School. Bean received her bachelor's degree from Valdosta State University, where she joined the sorority Delta Sigma Theta. She enrolled to study accounting but at the urging of one of her professors, she instead pursued acting. Mitchell adopted the stage name Gail Bean due to the nickname "Bean" that she went by as a high school student.

Bean received positive critical reception for her starring role in the 2015 film Unexpected, which debuted at Sundance Film Festival. In the film she plays a pregnant teen opposite Cobie Smulders. She was named one of 10 Sundance Breakout Stars by TheWrap for her performance. Bean went on to appear in television series including Insecure, Love in the Time of Corona, Detroiters, Chicago P.D., Grey's Anatomy, and Paradise Lost. She gained wider notoriety in 2018 as a main cast member on Snowfall, where she portrays Wanda Bell, a young woman who dates a drug dealer and later struggles with addiction. As of 2022, she is also a cast member on P-Valley. Bean portrays Roulette, a rebellious new dancer at The Pynk. Bean returned to play Wanda Bell in the Snowfall spin-off The Drop: A Snowfall Saga.

== Filmography ==
=== Film ===
Year	Title	Role	Notes
2011	Diamonds Aren't Forever	Jessica Roberts	
2012	Herstory	Susie Screw	Short
2013	I Stand Alone	-	Short
2013	The Special Project	Brittany	Short
2013	Love and War	Felicia	Short
2013	The Final Hour	Rebecca Lee	Short
2013	At Mamu's Feet	Amanda	
2014	Good Wood	Juror 1	
2014	Duffle	Nikki Lamont	Short
2015	Unexpected	Jasmine	
2016	The Belko Experiment	Leota Hynek	
2018	The Culprit	Shannon	Short
2018	Jacks	Bertha	Short
2019	Skin in the Game	Jasmine	
2019	Test Pattern	Amber	
2020	Outcast	Imara	Short
2020	The Social Distance Activity	Rachel	
2024	The Piano Lesson	Dolly	
2025	Both Eyes Open	Ally	Also executive producer

=== Television ===
Year	Title	Role	Notes
2013	Estrogen	Monica	Main cast
2014	Sex Sent Me to the ER	Megan	Episode: "Clean Up on Aisle 4"
2014	Sugar	Aja	Episode: "Pilot"
2016	Insecure	Rasheeda	Episode: "Racist as Fuck" & "Thirsty as Fuck"
2017	Meta-Dimensional	Gaia	Episode: "Pilot"
2017	Snap!	-	Episode: "Pilot"
2017	The Trustee	Delana	TV movie
2018	Chicago P.D.	Sienna	Episode: "Confidential"
2018	Atlanta	Nadine	Episode: "Champagne Papi"
2018	Detroiters	Megan	Episode: "Lois" & "Royals"
2018	Velvet	Demetra	Main cast
2018–23	Snowfall	Wanda Bell	Recurring cast: season 2-5; main cast: season 6
2019	Games People Play	Quanisha	Recurring cast: season 1
2020	Grey's Anatomy	Caitlin Freeman	Episode: "Give a Little Bit"
2020	Paradise Lost	Gynnifer Green	Recurring cast
2020	Love in the Time of Corona	Adeah	Recurring cast
2020	Cast Black Talent Virtual Reading Series	Toyia	Episode: "Hurt Village"
2022–present	P-Valley	Roulette	Recurring cast: season 2; main cast: season 3
2025	Harlem	Eva Lewis	Season 3
2026	The Drop: A Snowfall Saga	Wanda Bell	Lead Role

=== Stage ===
Year	Title	Role	Venue	Ref.
2025	Table 17	Jada	Los Angeles, Geffen Playhouse	

=== Video games ===
Year	Title	Role	Notes
2018	Red Dead Redemption II	The Local Pedestrian Population (voice)	

== Awards and nominations ==
Year	Award	Category	Work	Result	Ref.
2021	Black Reel Awards	Outstanding Guest Actress, Drama Series	Snowfall	Nominated	
