= Trevor Engelson =

American actor and producer (born 1976)

- Born: October 23, 1976 (age 49); Great Neck, New York, U.S.
- Education: University of Southern California
- Occupations: Film producer; talent manager
- Spouses: Meghan Markle (m. 2011; div. 2014); Tracey Kurland (m. 2019)
- Children: 3

Trevor Engelson (born October 23, 1976) is an American film producer and literary manager, whose work has included producing the TV series Snowfall, as well as the 2010 film Remember Me. Prior to his marriage to Tracey Kurland, he was married to Meghan Markle.

== Early life and education ==
Engelson was born on October 23, 1976, in Great Neck, New York, on Long Island. He is Jewish, attended John L. Miller Great Neck North High School, and studied journalism at the University of Southern California in Los Angeles.

== Career ==
After college, Engelson began a career as a production assistant and later moved into talent management before founding his own production company, Underground, in 2001. As a producer, he has worked on several films and television shows. These include Remember Me, Outpost 37, License to Wed and All About Steve. He also produced the series Snowfall. In 2018, Engelson was set to start work on a fictional drama for Fox Broadcasting about a British prince.

== Personal life ==
Engelson began dating Meghan Markle in 2004. The couple married at the Jamaica Inn in Ocho Rios, Jamaica on August 16, 2011. They separated after approximately two years and in February 2014 were granted a no-fault divorce citing irreconcilable differences. Because of his previous marriage to Markle, Engelson attracted significant media attention when Markle became engaged to Prince Harry in November 2017.

Following his divorce from Markle, Engelson dated Bethenny Frankel of The Real Housewives of New York City. According to Frankel, their romantic relationship subsequently devolved into a business one. On June 1, 2018, Engelson became engaged to dietitian Tracey Kurland, daughter of investment trust founder Stanford Kurland (died January 2021), and heiress to a multi-million dollar fortune. The couple married on May 11, 2019, in California. In August 2020, it was reported that Kurland had given birth to a daughter. The couple had a second daughter in 2021, and a son in February 2025.

== Filmography ==
Year	Title	Role	Notes
2006	Zoom	Executive producer	
2006	Santa Baby	Co-executive producer	
2007	License to Wed	Co-producer	
2009	All About Steve	Executive producer	
2010	Remember Me	Producer	
2012	Amber Alert	Producer	
2013	Supanatural	Executive producer	
2013–present	Bastards	Producer	
2013–present	Bad Advice from My Brother	Producer	
2014	Outpost 37	Producer	
2016	Rise	Producer	
2016	Incarnate	Producer	
2017	Give Me Future	Executive producer	Documentary
2017	L.A. Burning: The Riots 25 Years Later	Executive producer	
2017–2023	Snowfall	Executive producer	Executive producer for 11 episodes
2018	The After Party	Producer	
2018	Heathers	Executive producer	Executive producer for 6 episodes
2019	Desi Lydic: Abroad	Executive producer	
2020	Chasing the Sound	Executive producer	
2020	Dream Team	Executive producer	
2021	Small Engine Repair	Executive producer	
TBA	Dragon's Lair: The Movie	Producer	Announced for production
