= Peyton Alex Smith =

American actor and rapper (born 1994)

- Born: June 18, 1994 (age 32); Dallas, Texas, U.S.
- Occupations: Actor, rapper
- Years active: 2006–present

Peyton Alex Smith (born June 18, 1994) is an American actor and rapper, best known for his role as Damon Sims in the TV series All American: Homecoming as well as Rafael Waithe in The CW series Legacies and Cedric Hobbs in the TV series The Quad. Smith attended Florida A&M University.

== Filmography ==
=== Film ===
Year	Title	Role
2015	Carter High	Vincent
2017	Detroit	Lee Forsythe

=== Television ===
Year	Title	Role	Notes
2006	Barney & Friends	Jamal	Single Appearance
2016	Luke Cage	Chauncey	
2017	The Quad	Cedric Hobbs	Main role
2017	Tales	Miles	
2018–2021	Legacies	Rafael Waithe	Main role (seasons 1–3), special guest star (season 4)
2021–2023	BMF	Boom	Recurring, Seasons 1-2
2021	All American	Damon Sims	Backdoor Pilot. Season 3, Episode 17
2022–2024	All American: Homecoming	Damon Sims	Main role (seasons 1–2), recurring role (season 3)
2026	The Drop: A Snowfall Saga	James Kinsey “J-Loco”	Regular role (season 1)
