= List of 20th Television programs =

This is a list of programs produced, distributed or owned by 20th Television, a subsidiary of Disney Television Studios.

== Television series ==
=== 20th Television ===
Title	Genre	First air date	Last air date	No. of seasons	Network	Co-production company(s)	Notes
TCF Television Productions, Inc. (1949–1958)
Crusade in Europe	Documentary	May 5, 1949	October 27, 1949	1	ABC		
The 20th Century Fox Hour	Anthology	October 5, 1955	June 12, 1957	2	CBS		
My Friend Flicka	Adventure	February 10, 1956	November 2, 1956	1	CBS		Based on the 1943 film of the same name by 20th Century Fox
Broken Arrow	Western	September 25, 1956	June 24, 1958	2	ABC		Based on the 1950 film of the same name
20th Century-Fox Television (1958–1985)
How to Marry a Millionaire	Sitcom	October 7, 1957	August 20, 1959	2	Syndicated	National Telefilm Associates (Note: No longer distributed by 20th Television.)	Based on the 1953 film of the same name by 20th Century Fox; credited as TCF Television Productions, Inc. for first season
Man Without a Gun	Western	November 6, 1957	September 10, 1959	2	Syndicated		Credited as TCF Television Productions, Inc. for first season
The Many Loves of Dobie Gillis	Sitcom	September 29, 1959	June 5, 1963	4	CBS	Martin Manulis Productions (seasons 1–2) and Marman Productions (seasons 3–4)	Based on the 1953 film The Affairs of Dobie Gillis by Metro Goldwyn Mayer
Five Fingers	Espionage	October 3, 1959	January 8, 1960	1	NBC	Martin Manulis Productions	
Adventures in Paradise	Adventure	October 5, 1959	April 1, 1962	3	ABC	Martin Manulis Productions and Marjay Productions Inc.	
Hong Kong	Adventure	September 28, 1960	March 29, 1961	1	ABC		
Follow the Sun	Adventure	September 17, 1961	April 8, 1962	1	ABC		
Bus Stop	Drama	October 1, 1961	March 25, 1962	1	ABC	The Belmont Television Company, Inc.	Based on the 1956 film of the same name by 20th Century Fox
Margie	Sitcom	October 12, 1961	April 12, 1962	1	ABC		Based on the 1946 film of the same name by 20th Century Fox
Voyage to the Bottom of the Sea	Science fiction	September 14, 1964	March 31, 1968	4	ABC	Irwin Allen Productions and Cambridge Productions, Inc.	Based on the 1961 film of the same name
Peyton Place	Soap opera	September 15, 1964	June 2, 1969	5	ABC		based on the 1957 film of the same name
12 O'Clock High	Military drama	September 18, 1964	January 13, 1967	3	ABC	Quinn Martin Productions	based on the 1949 film of the same name
Valentine's Day	Sitcom	September 18, 1964	April 30, 1965	1	ABC	Savannah Productions, Inc. and Yorktan Productions, Inc.	
Daniel Boone	Western	September 24, 1964	May 7, 1970	6	NBC	Arcola Pictures Corp., Fespar Enterprises, Inc. and NBC-TV	
The Legend of Jesse James	Western	September 13, 1965	May 9, 1966	1	ABC		
Lost in Space	Science fiction	September 15, 1965	March 6, 1968	3	CBS	Irwin Allen Productions, Jodi Productions, Inc., Van Bernard Productions, Inc. and The CBS Television Network	
The Long, Hot Summer	Drama	September 16, 1965	April 13, 1966	1	ABC		based on the 1958 film of the same name
The Loner	Western	September 18, 1965	March 12, 1966	1	CBS	Greenway Productions and Interlaken Productions	
Batman	Superhero	January 12, 1966	March 14, 1968	3	ABC	Greenway Productions	based on the DC Comics character
Blue Light	Military drama	January 12, 1966	May 18, 1966	1	ABC	Rogo Productions	
The Man Who Never Was	Adventure	September 7, 1966	January 4, 1967	1	ABC	Palomino Productions	
The Monroes	Western	September 7, 1966	March 15, 1967	1	ABC	Qualis Productions	
The Tammy Grimes Show	Sitcom	September 8, 1966	September 29, 1966	1	ABC	Greenway Productions and Tamworth Productions	
The Green Hornet	Superhero	September 9, 1966	March 17, 1967	1	ABC	Greenway Productions	
The Time Tunnel	Science fiction	September 9, 1966	April 7, 1967	1	ABC	Irwin Allen Productions and Kent Productions, Inc.	
Felony Squad	Police drama	September 12, 1966	January 31, 1969	3	ABC		
Custer	Western	September 6, 1967	December 27, 1967	1	ABC		
Judd, for the Defense	Legal drama	September 8, 1967	March 21, 1969	2	ABC		
Journey to the Center of the Earth	Animated adventure	September 9, 1967	December 30, 1967	1	ABC	Filmation	Based on the 1959 movie of the same name by 20th Century Fox
Fantastic Voyage	Animated science fiction	September 14, 1968	January 4, 1969	1	ABC	Filmation	based on the 1966 movie of the same name by 20th Century Fox
Julia	Sitcom	September 17, 1968	March 23, 1971	3	NBC	Savannah Productions and Hanncar Productions	
The Ghost & Mrs. Muir	Sitcom	September 21, 1968	March 13, 1970	2	NBC (Season 1); ABC (Season 2)		based on the 1947 film of the same name
Land of the Giants	Science fiction	September 22, 1968	March 22, 1970	2	ABC	Irwin Allen Productions and Kent Productions, Inc.	
Lancer	Western	September 24, 1968	June 23, 1970	2	CBS		
Journey to the Unknown	Anthology	September 26, 1968	January 30, 1969	1	ABC	Hammer Film Productions	Aired on ITV in the UK
The Hardy Boys	Animated mystery	September 6, 1969	December 27, 1969	1	ABC	Filmation	distribution only
Room 222	School dramedy	September 11, 1969	January 11, 1974	5	ABC	Gene Reynolds Productions	
Bracken's World	Drama	September 19, 1969	December 25, 1970	2	NBC		
Nanny and the Professor	Sitcom	January 21, 1970	December 27, 1971	3	ABC		
The Best of Everything	Drama	March 30, 1970	September 25, 1970	1	ABC		Based on the 1959 film of the same name
Doctor Dolittle	Animated adventure	September 12, 1970	January 9, 1971	1	NBC	DePatie–Freleng Enterprises	Based on the 1967 movie of the same name by APJAC Productions and 20th Century Fox
Here Come the Double Deckers	Sitcom	September 12, 1970	January 2, 1971	1	ABC	Harry Booth-Roy Simpson-Century Film Productions	Aired on BBC One in the UK
Arnie	Sitcom	September 19, 1970	March 11, 1972	2	CBS		
Cade's County	Western	September 19, 1971	April 9, 1972	1	CBS		
Circus	Variety	September 20, 1971	September 14, 1973	2	Syndicated		
Return to Peyton Place	Soap opera	April 3, 1972	January 4, 1974	3	NBC		Based on the 1961 film of the same name
Anna and the King	Sitcom	September 17, 1972	December 31, 1972	1	CBS		Based on Anna and the King of Siam and The King and I by 20th Century Fox
M*A*S*H	Sitcom	September 17, 1972	February 28, 1983	11	CBS		From the 20th Century Fox 1970 film of the same name
ABC's Wide World of Entertainment	Various	January 8, 1973	January 10, 1976	4	ABC		select programming
A Little Princess	Fantasy	February 18, 1973	March 25, 1973	1	BBC One	ABC and the BBC	miniseries; aired on ABC in the U.S.
Jack the Ripper	Police procedural	July 13, 1973	August 17, 1973	1	BBC One	BBC	miniseries; syndicated in the U.S.
Moonbase 3	Science fiction	September 9, 1973	October 14, 1973	1	BBC One	ABC and the BBC	aired on ABC in the U.S.
Orson Welles Great Mysteries	Anthology	September 12, 1973	April 17, 1974	1	Syndicated	Anglia Television	Distribution only; aired on ITV in the UK
The New Perry Mason	Legal drama	September 16, 1973	January 27, 1974	1	CBS	Paisano Productions	Revival of Perry Mason
The Starlost	Science fiction	September 22, 1973	January 5, 1974	1	CTV	CTV Television Network & Glen Warren Productions	syndicated in the U.S.
Roll Out	Sitcom	October 5, 1973	January 4, 1974	1	CBS		Loosely based on the 1952 film Red Ball Express by Universal Pictures
Hawkeye, the Pathfinder	Drama	November 18, 1973	December 13, 1973	1	BBC One	ABC and the BBC	Miniseries; aired on ABC in the U.S.
The Fortunes of Nigel	Drama	February 24, 1974	March 24, 1974	1	BBC One	ABC and the BBC	Miniseries; aired on ABC in the U.S.
Run, Joe, Run	Action	September 7, 1974	November 30, 1975	2	NBC	William P. D'Angelo Productions	
Masquerade Party	Game show	September 9, 1974	September 5, 1975	1	Syndicated	Stefan Hatos-Monty Hall Productions	revival of 1952–1960 game show; distribution only
Planet of the Apes	Science fiction	September 13, 1974	December 20, 1974	1	CBS		Based on the 1968 film of the same name by 20th Century Fox
Dinah!	Talk show	October 21, 1974	September 18, 1980	6	Syndicated		
Karen	Sitcom	January 30, 1975	May 8, 1975	1	ABC		
Oil Strike North	Drama	August 26, 1975	November 18, 1975	1	BBC One		syndicated in the U.S.
Return to the Planet of the Apes	Animated science fiction	September 6, 1975	November 29, 1975	1	NBC	DePatie–Freleng Enterprises	Based on the Planet of the Apes franchise by APJAC Productions and 20th Century Fox
The Swiss Family Robinson	Adventure	September 14, 1975	April 11, 1976	1	ABC	Irwin Allen Productions	based on the novel of the same name
That's Hollywood!	Documentary	September 13, 1976	May 23, 1982	6	Syndicated	Castle Combe Productions	
Loves Me, Loves Me Not	Sitcom	March 20, 1977	April 27, 1977	1	CBS	Witt/Thomas/Harris Productions	
Young Dan'l Boone	Western	September 12, 1977	October 4, 1977	1	CBS	Frankel Productions	
James at 15	Drama	October 27, 1977	June 29, 1978	1	NBC		later titled James at 16
Husbands, Wives & Lovers	Sitcom	March 10, 1978	June 30, 1978	1	CBS		
The Paper Chase	Drama	September 9, 1978	August 9, 1986	4	CBS (Season 1); Showtime (Seasons 2–4)		Based on the 1973 film of the same name by 20th Century Fox
W.E.B.	Drama	September 13, 1978	October 5, 1978	1	NBC		
Dance Fever	Music	January 13, 1979	May 30, 1987	9	Syndicated	Anthony Productions (1979–1986), Merv Griffin Productions (1979–84), Merv Griffin Enterprises (1984–1987) and January Enterprises (1986–1987)	
Billy	Sitcom	February 26, 1979	April 28, 1979	1	CBS	John Rich Productions	
Trapper John, M.D.	Medical drama	September 23, 1979	September 4, 1986	7	CBS	Frank Glicksman Productions and Don Brinkley Productions	Based on the 1970 movie M*A*S*H by 20th Century Fox
Hagen	Legal drama	March 15, 1980	April 24, 1980	1	CBS	Frank Glicksman Productions and Chad Everett Productions	
The Monte Carlo Show	Variety	October 5, 1980	September 20, 1981	1	Syndicated	Marty Paseta Overseas	Aired on ITV in the UK
Ladies' Man	Sitcom	October 27, 1980	February 21, 1981	1	CBS	Herbert B. Leonard Productions	
Breaking Away	Dramedy	November 29, 1980	January 10, 1981	1	ABC		Based on the 1979 film of the same name by 20th Century Fox
Dynasty	Drama	January 12, 1981	May 11, 1989	9	ABC	Aaron Spelling Productions	
The Fall Guy	Action	November 4, 1981	May 2, 1986	5	ABC	Glen A. Larson Productions	
Jessica Novak	Drama	November 5, 1981	December 3, 1982	1	CBS	Brownstone Productions	
All-American Ultra Quiz	Game show	November 10, 1981	November 17, 1981	1	NBC		
9 to 5	Sitcom	March 25, 1982	March 26, 1988	5	ABC (Seasons 1–3); Syndicated (Seasons 4–5)	IPC Films	Based on the 1980 film of the same name by IPC Films and 20th Century Fox
Trauma Center	Medical drama	September 22, 1983	December 8, 1983	1	ABC	Glen A. Larson Productions and Jeremac Productions	
AfterMASH	Sitcom	September 26, 1983	May 31, 1985	2	CBS		
Emerald Point N.A.S.	Drama	September 26, 1983	March 12, 1984	1	CBS	Richard & Esther Shapiro Productions	
It's Not Easy	Sitcom	September 29, 1983	October 27, 1983	1	ABC	Patricia Nardo Productions & Konigsberg Company	
Manimal	Fantasy	September 30, 1983	December 17, 1983	1	NBC	Glen A. Larson Productions	
Automan	Superhero	December 15, 1983	April 2, 1984	1	ABC	The Kushner-Locke Company and Glen A. Larson Productions	
Masquerade	Espionage	December 15, 1983	April 27, 1984	1	ABC	Renée Valente Productions and Glen A. Larson Productions	
Hammer House of Mystery and Suspense	Anthology	September 5, 1984	December 17, 1984	1	ITV	Hammer Film Productions	syndicated in the U.S.
Cover Up	Action	September 22, 1984	April 6, 1985	1	CBS	Glen A. Larson Productions	
Half Nelson	Dramedy	March 24, 1985	May 10, 1985	1	NBC	Glen A. Larson Productions	
20th Century Fox Television (1985–1989)
Ewoks	Animated adventure	September 7, 1985	December 13, 1986	2	ABC	Nelvana, Lucasfilm, Wang Film Productions	Based on Star Wars by George Lucas
Star Wars: Droids	Animated adventure	September 7, 1985	June 7, 1986	1	ABC	Nelvana, Lucasfilm	Based on Star Wars by George Lucas
Small Wonder	Sitcom	September 7, 1985	May 20, 1989	4	Syndicated	The Small Wonder Joint Venture	continued production during seasons 2–4 after acquiring Metromedia, which produced the first season.
Charlie & Co.	Sitcom	September 18, 1985	May 16, 1986	1	CBS	Bob Henry Productions and Allan Katz Productions	
Tender Is the Night	Drama	October 29, 1985	November 26, 1985	1	Showtime	Showtime Entertainment, Seven Network & BBC	based on the 1962 film of the same name; miniseries
Fathers and Sons	Sitcom	April 6, 1986	May 4, 1986	1	NBC		
Spearfield's Daughter	Drama	June 2, 1986	June 4, 1986	1	Syndicated		Miniseries; aired on Seven Network in Australia
A Current Affair	Newsmagazine	July 28, 1986	August 30, 1996	10	Syndicated		Original run; Currently owned by Fox First Run
Dream Girl, U.S.A.	Game show	September 8, 1986	September 4, 1987	1	Syndicated	Dream Girl Enterprises	
The Wizard	Action	September 9, 1986	March 12, 1987	1	CBS	BSR Productions	
L.A. Law	Legal drama	September 15, 1986	May 19, 1994	8	NBC	Steven Bochco Productions	
Heart of the City	Crime drama	September 20, 1986	January 10, 1987	1	ABC	American Flyer Productions	
The Late Show	Talk show	October 9, 1986	October 28, 1988	2	Fox	Fox Square Productions	Distribution only
The Tracey Ullman Show	Variety	April 5, 1987	May 26, 1990	4	Fox	Gracie Films	Animation and opening sequences co-produced by Klasky Csupo
21 Jump Street	Police drama	April 12, 1987	April 27, 1991	5	Fox (seasons 1-4); Syndicated (season 5)	Patrick Hasburgh Productions & Stephen J. Cannell Productions	U.S. Distribution by Carsey-Werner Distribution
The New Adventures of Beans Baxter	Adventure	July 18, 1987	November 28, 1987	2	Fox	Savage Productions and Fox Square Productions	Distribution only
Hooperman	Dramedy	September 23, 1987	July 19, 1989	2	ABC	Adam Productions	
Second Chance	Sitcom	September 26, 1987	May 14, 1988	1	Fox	Lightkeeper Productions	Retitled Boys Will Be Boys for season 2
Leg Work	Police drama	October 3, 1987	November 7, 1987	1	CBS	Treasure Island Productions	
Pursuit of Happiness	Sitcom	October 30, 1987	January 8, 1988	1	ABC	Hanley Productions	
America's Most Wanted	Public service	February 7, 1988	April 21, 2012 (Note: Returned on March 15, 2021 as an XG and Fox Alternative Entertainment production)	26	Fox (Seasons 1–24, 26); Lifetime (Season 25)	Walsh Productions (1988–2012), Michael Linder Productions (1988–1990) and Fox Television Stations Productions (original run)	Currently owned by Fox First Run
The Reporters	Newsmagazine	July 30, 1988	March 31, 1990	2	Fox		
Have Faith	Sitcom	April 18, 1989	June 13, 1989	1	ABC	Pronoun Trouble Inc. & Adam Productions	
20th Television (1989–1994)
Mr. Belvedere	Sitcom	March 15, 1985	July 8, 1990	6	ABC	Lazy B/F.O.B. Productions	Based on the 1948 film Sitting Pretty and its two sequels by 20th Century Fox; credited as 20th Century Fox Television
Anything but Love	Sitcom	March 4, 1989	June 3, 1992	4	ABC	Lookout, Inc. (season 1) and Adam Productions	Credited as 20th Century Fox Television
Sister Kate	Sitcom	September 16, 1989	July 30, 1990	1	NBC	Lazy B/F.O.B. Productions & Mea Culpa Productions	Credited as 20th Century Fox Television
Alien Nation	Science fiction	September 18, 1989	May 7, 1990	1	Fox	Kenneth Johnson Productions	Based on the 1988 film of the same name by American Entertainment Partners & 20th Century Fox; credited as 20th Century Fox Television
Doogie Howser, M.D.	Medical dramedy	September 19, 1989	March 24, 1993	4	ABC	Steven Bochco Productions	Credited as 20th Century Fox Television
In Living Color	Sketch comedy	April 5, 1990	May 19, 1994	5	Fox	Ivory Way Productions	Credited as 20th Century Fox Television for first three seasons
Working Girl	Sitcom	April 16, 1990	July 30, 1990	1	NBC	Patchett Kaufman Entertainment	Based on the 1988 film of the same name by 20th Century Fox
Working It Out	Sitcom	August 22, 1990	December 12, 1990	1	NBC	DanJali Productions	
True Colors	Sitcom	September 2, 1990	April 12, 1992	2	Fox	Hanley Productions	
Babes	Sitcom	September 13, 1990	May 19, 1991	1	Fox	Sandollar Productions	
Cop Rock	Musical police drama	September 26, 1990	December 26, 1990	1	ABC	Steven Bochco Productions	
Good Grief	Sitcom	September 30, 1990	February 3, 1991	1	Fox	Triggerfish Productions and Morra, Brezner & Steinberg Entertainment, Inc.	
Studs	Game show	March 11, 1991	September 3, 1993	3	Syndicated	Fox Television Studios and FA Productions	Currently owned by Fox First Run
The Sunday Comics	Standup comedy	April 28, 1991	December 22, 1991	1	Fox	Dakota North Entertainment	
Drexell's Class	Sitcom	September 19, 1991	March 5, 1992	1	Fox	Grantwood Productions	
Civil Wars	Legal drama	November 20, 1991	March 2, 1993	2	ABC	Steven Bochco Productions	
Capitol Critters	Animated sitcom	January 28, 1992	March 14, 1992	1	ABC	Hanna-Barbera, Steven Bochco Productions and Wang Film Productions	13 episodes were produced, but only 7 aired on ABC and remaining 6 aired on Cartoon Network in 1995
Stand by Your Man	Sitcom	April 5, 1992	May 17, 1992	1	Fox	Home Made Productions & WitzEnd Productions	
Likely Suspects	Crime drama	September 11, 1992	January 14, 1993	1	Fox	Four Point Entertainment	
Rhythm & Blues	Sitcom	September 24, 1992	February 12, 1993	1	NBC	Mixed Emotions, Inc.	
Dudley	Sitcom	April 16, 1993	May 14, 1993	1	CBS	WitzEnd Productions and CBS Entertainment Productions	Credited as 20th Television since in 1989, 20th Century Fox Television's functions were taken over by Twentieth Television Corporation.
The Chevy Chase Show	Talk show	September 7, 1993	October 1, 1993	1	Fox	Cornelius Productions	
The Byrds of Paradise	Drama	March 3, 1994	June 23, 1994	1	ABC	Steven Bochco Productions	
South Central	Sitcom	April 5, 1994	June 7, 1994	1	Fox	Slick/Mac Productions	
20th Century Fox Television (1994–2020)
Silk Stalkings	Crime drama	November 7, 1991	April 18, 1999	8	CBS (Seasons 1–2); USA (Seasons 3–8)	Stu Segall Productions, Stephen J. Cannell Productions (seasons 1–4), Cannell Entertainment (seasons 5–8) Columbia Pictures Television (season 5) and New World Entertainment (seasons 5–8); (1995)	Produced from 1997 to 1999 after Fox acquired New World; U.S. distribution by Carsey-Werner Distribution
Picket Fences	Dramedy	September 18, 1992	June 26, 1996	4	CBS	David E. Kelley Productions	Credited as 20th Television for first three seasons
The X-Files	Science fiction	September 10, 1993	March 21, 2018	11	Fox	Ten Thirteen Productions	Originally ended on May 19, 2002
NYPD Blue	Police drama	September 21, 1993	March 1, 2005	12	ABC	Steven Bochco Productions	Credited as 20th Television during first two seasons
Wild Oats	Sitcom	September 4, 1994	September 25, 1994	1	Fox	K-Rule Productions	
Chicago Hope	Medical drama	September 18, 1994	May 4, 2000	6	CBS	David E. Kelley Productions	Credited as 20th Television for season 1
The 5 Mrs. Buchanans	Sitcom	September 24, 1994	March 25, 1995	1	CBS	Wooten & Cherry Productions	
The Crew	Sitcom	August 31, 1995	June 30, 1996	1	Fox	Wooten & Cherry Productions	
The Preston Episodes	Sitcom	September 9, 1995	October 28, 1995	1	Fox	Dahoka Productions & Jobsite Productions	
Cleghorne!	Sitcom	September 10, 1995	December 17, 1995	1	The WB	Pepoon/Silverman/Sustarsic Productions	
Murder One	Legal drama	September 19, 1995	May 29, 1997	2	ABC	Steven Bochco Productions	
Space: Above and Beyond	Science fiction	September 24, 1995	June 2, 1996	1	Fox	Hard Eight Pictures, Inc.	
L.A. Firefighters	Firefighter drama	June 3, 1996	July 8, 1996	1	Fox	Gordon Greisman Productions	
The Last Frontier	Sitcom	June 3, 1996	July 8, 1996	1	Fox	HBO Independent Productions	
The Pretender	Science fiction	September 19, 1996	May 13, 2000	4	NBC	Mitchell/Van Sickle Productions and NBC Studios	Took over production from MTM Enterprises after first season; distributed outside of the U.S. by NBCUniversal International Distribution
Relativity	Dramedy	September 24, 1996	April 14, 1997	1	ABC	The Bedford Falls Company	
Millennium	Thriller	October 25, 1996	May 21, 1999	3	Fox	Ten Thirteen Productions	
Pauly	Sitcom	March 3, 1997	April 7, 1997	1	Fox	3 Arts Entertainment, Landing Patch Productions and Zimmerman-Berg	
The Practice	Legal drama	March 4, 1997	May 16, 2004	8	ABC	David E. Kelley Productions	
Temporarily Yours	Sitcom	March 5, 1997	April 9, 1997	1	CBS	Garden State Productions	
Buffy the Vampire Slayer	Fantasy	March 10, 1997	May 20, 2003	7	The WB (Seasons 1–5); UPN (Seasons 6–7)	Mutant Enemy Productions, Kuzui Enterprises and Sandollar Television	Based on the 1992 film of the same name by 20th Century Fox
Ally McBeal	Legal dramedy	September 8, 1997	May 20, 2002	5	Fox	David E. Kelley	
413 Hope St.	Drama	September 11, 1997	January 1, 1998	1	Fox	Nu Systems Productions, Inc.	
Nothing Sacred	Drama	September 18, 1997	March 14, 1998	1	ABC	Sarabande Productions	
The Visitor	Science fiction	September 19, 1997	January 16, 1998	1	Fox	Centropolis Television	
Dharma & Greg	Sitcom	September 24, 1997	April 30, 2002	5	ABC	Chuck Lorre Productions, More-Medavoy Productions and 4 to 6 Foot Productions	
Total Security	Detective drama	September 27, 1997	November 8, 1997	1	ABC	Steven Bochco Productions	
That's Life	Sitcom	March 10, 1998	April 7, 1998	1	ABC	Eric Gilliland Productions	
Two Guys and a Girl	Sitcom	March 10, 1998	May 16, 2001	4	ABC	In Front Productions	Originally titled Two Guys, a Girl and a Pizza Place
Getting Personal	Sitcom	April 6, 1998	October 23, 1998	2	Fox	More-Medavoy Productions, Jeff & Jeff Productions (season 1), Handprint Entertainment (season 1) and Jeff Strauss Productions (season 2)	
Holding the Baby	Sitcom	August 23, 1998	December 15, 1998	1	Fox	Howard J. Morris Productions and Granada Entertainment	
Living in Captivity	Sitcom	September 11, 1998	October 16, 1998	1	Fox	Shukovsky English Entertainment and Dog Soup, Inc.	
Martial Law	Action dramedy	September 26, 1998	May 13, 2000	2	CBS	Carlton Cuse Productions, Ruddy Morgan Productions and CBS Productions	Distributed outside of the U.S. by Paramount Global Distribution Group
Strange World	Crime drama	March 8, 1999	March 16, 1999	1	ABC	Teakwood Lane Productions	Moved to Sci-fi in 2002
Get Real	Dramedy	September 8, 1999	April 12, 2000	1	Fox	Clyde Phillips Productions	
Judging Amy	Legal drama	September 19, 1999	May 3, 2005	6	CBS	Barbara Hall-Joseph Stern Productions and CBS Productions	Owned by CBS Media Ventures
Stark Raving Mad	Sitcom	September 23, 1999	July 13, 2000	1	NBC	Steven Levitan Productions	
Snoops	Detective drama	September 26, 1999	December 19, 1999	1	ABC	David E. Kelley Productions	
Angel	Fantasy	October 5, 1999	May 19, 2004	5	The WB	Mutant Enemy Productions, Greenwolf Corp. (season 1), David Greenwalt Productions (seasons 2-3), Kuzui Enterprises and Sandollar Television	
Roswell	Science fiction	October 6, 1999	May 14, 2002	3	The WB (Seasons 1–2); UPN (Season 3)	Jason Katims Productions and Regency Television	
Harsh Realm	Fantasy	October 8, 1999	October 22, 1999	1	Fox	Ten Thirteen Productions	Moved to FX in 2000
Titus	Sitcom	March 20, 2000	August 12, 2002	3	Fox	Kenny & Hargrove and Deranged Entertainment	
Then Came You	Sitcom	March 22, 2000	April 26, 2000	1	ABC	Jeff Strauss Productions	
Soul Food: The Series	Drama	June 28, 2000	May 26, 2004	5	Showtime	Fox Television Studios (seasons 1-2), Water Walk Productions (seasons 3-5), Paramount Network Television, Showtime Networks, Edmonds Entertainment and State Street Pictures	Based on the 1997 film of the same name by 20th Century Fox; distributed in the U.S. by CBS Media Ventures
Yes, Dear	Sitcom	October 2, 2000	February 15, 2006	6	CBS	Amigos de Garcia Productions, Cherry Tree Entertainment and CBS Productions	
Dark Angel	Science fiction	October 3, 2000	May 3, 2002	2	Fox	Cameron/Eglee Productions	
FreakyLinks	Science fiction	October 6, 2000	June 22, 2001	1	Fox	Haxan Films and Regency Television	
Boston Public	School drama	October 23, 2000	January 30, 2004	4	Fox	David E. Kelley Productions	
Kate Brasher	Drama	February 24, 2001	April 14, 2001	1	CBS	Jersey Television and CBS Productions	
The Lone Gunmen	Science fiction	March 4, 2001	June 1, 2001	1	Fox	Ten Thirteen Productions	
The Chronicle	Science fiction	July 14, 2001	May 22, 2002	1	Sci Fi	The Greenblatt/Janollari Studio, Stu Segall Productions, Roundtable Productions and Silent H Productions	Distributed by 20th Century Fox Television International Television
The Education of Max Bickford	School drama	September 23, 2001	June 2, 2002	1	CBS	Sugar Mama Productions, Joe Cacaci Productions, Regency Television and CBS Productions	
Inside Schwartz	Sitcom	September 27, 2001	January 31, 2002	1	NBC	Stephen Engel Productions and NBC Studios	
UC: Undercover	Procedural drama	September 30, 2001	March 23, 2002	1	NBC	Jersey Television, Chasing Time Pictures, Regency Television and NBC Studios	
Bob Patterson	Sitcom	October 2, 2001	October 31, 2001	1	ABC	Angel Ark Productions and Touchstone Television	
Reba	Sitcom	October 5, 2001	February 18, 2007	6	The WB (Seasons 1–5); The CW (Season 6)	Bee Caves Road (2001–2002), (season 1) and Acme Productions	
24	Action	November 6, 2001	May 24, 2010	8	Fox	Imagine Television, Real Time Productions, and Teakwood Lane Productions	
The Bernie Mac Show	Sitcom	November 14, 2001	April 14, 2006	5	Fox	Wilmore Films and Regency Television	
American Family	Drama	January 23, 2002	July 11, 2004	2	PBS	El Norte Productions, KCET and The Greenblatt/Janollari Studio	
The American Embassy	Dramedy	March 11, 2002	April 1, 2002	1	Fox	Jersey Television	
Andy Richter Controls the Universe	Sitcom	March 19, 2002	January 12, 2003	2	Fox	Garfield Grove Productions and Paramount Network Television	Distributed in the U.S. by CBS Media Ventures
Greg the Bunny	Sitcom	March 27, 2002	August 11, 2002	1	Fox	Steven Levitan Productions, Moxie Pictures and Monkeys with Checkbooks (IFC version)	Moved to IFC in 2005 as a series of shorts
American High	Documentary	August 2, 2002	August 9, 2002	1	Fox	Actual Reality Pictures and Talent Entertainment Group	Moved to PBS after 4 episodes
Cedric the Entertainer Presents	Variety	September 18, 2002	March 19, 2003	1	Fox	Regency Television	Last six episodes aired on TV One
Firefly	Science fiction	September 20, 2002	December 20, 2002	1	Fox	Mutant Enemy Productions	
Still Standing	Sitcom	September 30, 2002	March 8, 2006	4	CBS	Tea Gal and Java Boy Productions and CBS Productions	
Girls Club	Dramedy	October 21, 2002	October 28, 2002	1	Fox	David E. Kelley Productions	
A.U.S.A.	Sitcom	February 4, 2003	April 1, 2003	1	NBC	Persons Unknown Productions and NBC Studios	
Oliver Beene	Sitcom	March 9, 2003	September 12, 2004	2	Fox	Steven Levitan Productions, (ge.wirtz) Films and DreamWorks Television	
The Pitts	Sitcom	March 30, 2003	April 20, 2003	1	Fox	Nothing Can Go Wrong Now Productions	
Hunter	Detective drama	April 19, 2003	May 3, 2003	1	NBC	Stephen J. Cannell Productions, Stu Segall Productions and NBC Studios	Revival of 1984 series U.S. distribution by Carsey-Werner Distribution
Charlie Lawrence	Sitcom	June 15, 2003	July 13, 2003	1	CBS	Jeffrey Richman Productions and CBS Productions	
Luis	Sitcom	September 19, 2003	October 17, 2003	1	Fox	Olive Bridge Entertainment	
The Brotherhood of Poland, New Hampshire	Drama	September 24, 2003	October 22, 2003	1	CBS	David E. Kelley Productions	
Miss Match	Dramedy	September 26, 2003	December 15, 2003	1	NBC	Imagine Television and Darren Star Productions	
The Lyon's Den	Legal drama	September 28, 2003	November 30, 2003	1	NBC	Brad Grey Television and Baby Owl Works Productions	
Married to the Kellys	Sitcom	October 3, 2003	April 23, 2004	1	ABC	Brad Grey Television and Game Six Productions	
Tru Calling	Supernatural drama	October 30, 2003	April 21, 2005	2	Fox	Oh That Gus! Inc. and Original Film	
Arrested Development	Sitcom	November 2, 2003	March 15, 2019	5	Fox (Seasons 1-3); Netflix (Seasons 4-5)	Imagine Television and The Hurwitz Company	Originally ended on February 10, 2006
The Simple Life	Reality	December 2, 2003	August 5, 2007	5	Fox (Seasons 1-3); E! (Seasons 4-5)	Bunim/Murray Productions	
Cracking Up	Sitcom	March 9, 2004	April 5, 2004	1	Fox	Brad Grey Television and Go Mike Go Productions	
Wonderfalls	Dramedy	March 12, 2004	April 1, 2004	1	Fox	Living Dead Guy Productions, Walking Bud Productions and Regency Television	
The Big House	Sitcom	April 2, 2004	April 30, 2004	1	ABC	Imagine Television	
The Jury	Legal drama	June 8, 2004	August 6, 2004	1	Fox	The Levinson/Fontana Company, MarlJim Productions and HBO Independent Productions	
North Shore	Drama	June 14, 2004	January 13, 2005	1	Fox	Brancoto/Salke Productions and Confidential Pictures Inc.	
Method & Red	Sitcom	June 16, 2004	September 15, 2004	1	Fox	If I Can Productions, Method Man Enterprises, Background Action, Inc., and Regency Television	
Quintuplets	Sitcom	June 16, 2004	January 12, 2005	1	Fox	Imagine Television and Mark Reisman Productions	
Boston Legal	Legal dramedy	October 3, 2004	December 8, 2008	5	ABC	David E. Kelley Productions	
Point Pleasant	Horror	January 19, 2005	March 17, 2005	1	Fox	Adelstein/Parouse Productions and Original Film	Last five episodes aired on Chiller in 2009
Jake in Progress	Sitcom	March 13, 2005	January 9, 2006	2	ABC	Brad Grey Television	
A Public Affair	Newsmagazine	March 21, 2005	October 28, 2005	1	Syndicated		Second run; Currently owned by Fox First Run
Stacked	Sitcom	April 13, 2005	January 11, 2006	2	Fox	Steven Levitan Productions	
The Inside	Crime drama	June 8, 2005	July 13, 2005	1	Fox	Imagine Television and Reamworks	
Over There	Military drama	July 27, 2005	October 26, 2005	1	FX	Steven Bochco Productions	
The Law Firm	Reality	July 28, 2005	August 4, 2005	1	NBC	Renegade 38 Inc. and David E. Kelley Productions	Moved to Bravo starting with episode 3
Prison Break	Action	August 29, 2005	May 30, 2017	5	Fox	Original Film, Adelstein/Parouse Productions (seasons 1–4), Dawn Olmstead Productions (season 5), Adelstein Productions (season 5) and One Light Productions (season 5)	Originally ended on May 15, 2009
Bones	Crime drama	September 13, 2005	March 28, 2017	12	Fox	Josephson Entertainment and Far Field Productions	
Head Cases	Dramedy	September 14, 2005	September 21, 2005	1	Fox	Jeff Rake Productions and Josephson Entertainment	
How I Met Your Mother	Sitcom	September 19, 2005	March 31, 2014	9	CBS	Bays Thomas Productions	
Kitchen Confidential	Sitcom	September 19, 2005	December 5, 2005	1	Fox	Hemingson Entertainment, Darren Star Productions and New Line Television	
My Name Is Earl	Sitcom	September 20, 2005	May 14, 2009	4	NBC	Amigos de Garcia Productions	
The Unit	Military drama	March 7, 2006	May 10, 2009	4	CBS	David Mamet Chicago (season 1), Bay Kinescope Boston (seasons 2–4) and MiddKid Productions	
The Loop	Sitcom	March 15, 2006	July 1, 2007	2	Fox	Olive Bridge Entertainment and Wounded Poodle Productions	
Pepper Dennis	Dramedy	April 4, 2006	July 4, 2006	1	The WB	Two Presbyterians and 21 Laps Entertainment	
Vanished	Thriller	August 21, 2006	November 10, 2006	1	Fox	Osprey Productions	Last four episodes were released on Fox's MySpace page
Desire	Drama	September 5, 2006	December 5, 2006	1	MyNetworkTV		
Fashion House	Drama	September 5, 2006	December 5, 2006	1	MyNetworkTV	Stu Segall Productions	
Standoff	Thriller	September 5, 2006	July 20, 2007	1	Fox	Sesfonstein Productions	
Shark	Legal drama	September 21, 2006	May 20, 2008	2	CBS	Imagine Television and Deforestation Services	
Watch Over Me	Drama	December 6, 2006	March 6, 2007	1	MyNetworkTV		
Wicked Wicked Games	Drama	December 6, 2006	March 6, 2007	1	MyNetworkTV		
The 1/2 Hour News Hour	Newsmagazine	February 18, 2007	May 27, 2007	1	Fox News		
The Winner	Sitcom	March 4, 2007	March 18, 2007	1	Fox	Candy Bar Productions and Fuzzy Door Productions	
The Wedding Bells	Dramedy	March 7, 2007	April 6, 2007	1	Fox	David E. Kelley Productions	
American Heiress	Drama	March 13, 2007	July 18, 2007	1	MyNetworkTV		
Saints & Sinners	Drama	March 14, 2007	July 18, 2007	1	MyNetworkTV		
Drive	Action	April 15, 2007	April 23, 2007	1	Fox	Reamworks	Last two episodes were shown on Fox's MySpace page
K-Ville	Police drama	September 17, 2007	December 17, 2007	1	Fox	Lockjaw Productions	
Back to You	Sitcom	September 19, 2007	May 14, 2008	1	Fox	Picture Day Productions	
Journeyman	Science fiction	September 24, 2007	December 19, 2007	1	NBC	Left Coast Productions	
Women's Murder Club	Procedural drama	October 12, 2007	May 13, 2008	1	ABC	Lucky Enough Productions, Paco & Blackjack, Inc., Writer's Workbench Films, Papa Joe Television and Rat Entertainment	
Unhitched	Sitcom	March 2, 2008	March 30, 2008	1	Fox	Watson Pond Productions and Conundrum Entertainment	
Miss Guided	Sitcom	March 18, 2008	April 3, 2008	1	ABC	Katalyst Media and ABC Studios	
Do Not Disturb	Sitcom	September 10, 2008	October 8, 2008	1	Fox	Broken Good Productions, Principato-Young Entertainment and Reveille Productions	
The Ex List	Dramedy	October 3, 2008	October 24, 2008	1	CBS	Keshet Media Group, Banana Goose Productions and Table Six Productions	
Life on Mars	Science fiction	October 9, 2008	April 1, 2009	1	ABC	Space Floor Television, Kudos and ABC Studios	Based on the British series of the same name
Lie to Me	Procedural drama	January 21, 2009	January 31, 2011	3	Fox	Imagine Television, Pagoda Pictures, Samuel Baum Productions and MiddKid Productions	
Dollhouse	Science fiction	February 13, 2009	January 29, 2010	2	Fox	Mutant Enemy Productions	
Better Off Ted	Sitcom	March 18, 2009	January 26, 2010	2	ABC	Garfield Grove Productions	
Sit Down, Shut Up	Animated sitcom	April 19, 2009	November 21, 2009	1	Fox	Tantamount Studios, ITV Studios, Rough Draft Studios, Adelaide Productions and Sony Pictures Television	Based on the Australian series of the same name; only 4 of the 13 episodes aired in primetime while the remaining 9 aired during late night
Glee	Dramedy	May 19, 2009	March 20, 2015	6	Fox	Brad Falchuk Teley-Vision and Ryan Murphy Television	
Modern Family	Sitcom	September 23, 2009	April 8, 2020	11	ABC	Lloyd-Levitan Productions (2009–2012), Steven Levitan Productions and Picador Productions	
The Cleveland Show	Animated sitcom	September 27, 2009	May 19, 2013	4	Fox	Persons Unknown Productions, Happy Jack Productions, Fuzzy Door Productions and Fox Television Animation	Spin-off of Family Guy
The Deep End	Legal drama	January 21, 2010	February 25, 2010	1	ABC	Hemingson Entertainment	
Sons of Tucson	Sitcom	March 14, 2010	August 1, 2010	1	Fox	J2TV and Walking Bud Productions	
Neighbors from Hell	Animated sitcom	June 7, 2010	July 26, 2010	1	TBS	Wounded Poodle Productions, MoonBoy Animation and Bento Box Entertainment	
Lone Star	Drama	September 20, 2010	September 27, 2010	1	Fox	Keyser/Lippman Productions and Depth of Field Productions	
Raising Hope	Sitcom	September 21, 2010	April 5, 2014	4	Fox	Amigos de Garcia Productions (seasons 1–4) and Slowly I Turned Productions (season 4)	
Marchlands	Drama	February 3, 2011	March 3, 2011	1	ITV	ITV Studios	Based on The Oaks; miniseries
The Chicago Code	Police drama	February 7, 2011	May 23, 2011	1	Fox	MiddKid Productions	
Traffic Light	Sitcom	February 8, 2011	May 31, 2011	1	Fox	Middletown News, Hemingson Entertainment, Keshet Media Group and Kuperman Productions	
CHAOS	Dramedy	April 1, 2011	July 16, 2011	1	CBS	Rat Entertainment, Certified Pulp and CBS Television Studios	
Friends with Benefits	Sitcom	August 5, 2011	September 9, 2011	1	NBC	Imagine Television, Big Kid Pictures and Pickle Films	
The Playboy Club	Period drama	September 19, 2011	October 3, 2011	1	NBC	Alta Loma Entertainment, Imagine Television and Storyland Entertainment	
New Girl	Sitcom	September 20, 2011	May 15, 2018	7	Fox	Meriwether Productions (episodes 1–3), Elizabeth Meriwether Pictures (episodes 4–146), American Nitwits and Chernin Entertainment	
Terra Nova	Science fiction	September 26, 2011	December 19, 2011	1	Fox	Amblin Television, Chernin Entertainment, Kapital Entertainment and Siesta Productions	
Allen Gregory	Animated sitcom	October 30, 2011	December 18, 2011	1	Fox	Jonah Hill Films, a J. Paul/A. Mogel, D. Goodman Pieces of Business, Chernin Entertainment and Bento Box Entertainment	
The Finder	Procedural drama	January 12, 2012	May 11, 2012	1	Fox	Josephson Entertainment and Far Field Productions	Spin-off of Bones
Napoleon Dynamite	Animated sitcom	January 15, 2012	March 4, 2012	1	Fox	Hess Films, Scully Production and Rough Draft Studios	Based on the 2004 film of the same name by Fox Searchlight Pictures and Paramount Pictures
Touch	Thriller	January 25, 2012	May 10, 2013	2	Fox	Tailwind Productions and Chernin Entertainment	
Awake	Fantasy	March 1, 2012	May 24, 2012	1	NBC	Letter Eleven and Teakwood Lane Productions	
Don't Trust the B— in Apartment 23	Sitcom	April 11, 2012	September 6, 2014	2	ABC	Fierce Baby Productions and Hemingson Entertainment	
The New Normal	Sitcom	September 10, 2012	April 2, 2013	1	NBC	Ali Adler is Here Productions and Ryan Murphy Television	
Ben and Kate	Sitcom	September 25, 2012	January 22, 2013	1	Fox	Hemingway Drive Productions and Chernin Entertainment	
1600 Penn	Sitcom	December 17, 2012	March 28, 2013	1	NBC	Angry Child Productions, Snowpants Productions, and Small Dog Picture Company	
Out There	Animated sitcom	February 22, 2013	April 19, 2013	1	IFC	Quincy Productions and Bento Box Entertainment	
Lightfields	Drama	February 27, 2013	March 27, 2013	1	ITV	ITV Studios	Based on The Oak; miniseries
How to Live with Your Parents (For the Rest of Your Life)	Sitcom	April 3, 2013	June 26, 2013	1	ABC	Imagine Television and Hot Lava Girl Productions	
The Goodwin Games	Sitcom	May 20, 2013	July 1, 2013	1	Fox	Shiny Brass Lamp Productions and Bays Thomas Productions	
Sleepy Hollow	Horror	September 16, 2013	March 31, 2017	4	Fox	Mark Goffman Productions, Sketch Films and K/O Paper Products	
Dads	Sitcom	September 17, 2013	February 11, 2014	1	Fox	Fuzzy Door Productions	One additional episode was released online in July 2014
Back in the Game	Sitcom	September 25, 2013	February 23, 2014	1	ABC	Kapital Entertainment and Cullen Bros. Television	
The Crazy Ones	Sitcom	September 26, 2013	April 17, 2014	1	CBS	David E. Kelley Productions	
Enlisted	Sitcom	January 10, 2014	June 22, 2014	1	Fox	Palace Flophouse and Snowpants Productions	
Mind Games	Dramedy	February 25, 2014	March 25, 2014	1	ABC	Letter Eleven	
Crisis	Action	March 16, 2014	June 21, 2014	1	NBC	Ravich-Shariat Productions	
Friends with Better Lives	Sitcom	March 31, 2014	May 26, 2014	1	CBS	Liscolaide Productions, Hemingson Entertainment and Kapital Entertainment	
24: Live Another Day	Action	May 5, 2014	July 14, 2014	1	Fox	Imagine Television and Teakwood Lane Productions	Ninth season of 24
Gang Related	Action	May 22, 2014	August 14, 2014	1	Fox	Imagine Television, Chris Morgan Productions, and Skeeter Rosenbaum Productions	
Cristela	Sitcom	October 10, 2014	March 6, 2015	1	ABC	21-Laps/Adelstein Productions and Hench in the Trench Productions	
Empire	Drama	January 7, 2015	April 21, 2020	6	Fox	Imagine Television, Lee Daniels Entertainment, Danny Strong Productions and Little Chicken Inc.	
Backstrom	Dramedy	January 22, 2015	April 30, 2015	1	Fox	Far Field Productions	
Fresh Off the Boat	Sitcom	February 4, 2015	February 21, 2020	6	ABC	Fierce Baby Productions and The Detective Agency	
The Last Man on Earth	Post-apocalyptic comedy	March 1, 2015	May 6, 2018	4	Fox	The Si Fi Company and Lord Miller Productions	
Weird Loners	Sitcom	March 31, 2015	May 5, 2015	1	Fox	Hanley Productions and The Detective Agency	
Wayward Pines	Mystery	May 14, 2015	July 27, 2016	2	Fox	Olive Entertainment, Blinding Edge Pictures, De Line Pictures and Storyland	Took over production from FX Productions after first season
The Carmichael Show	Sitcom	August 26, 2015	August 9, 2017	3	NBC	Morningside Entertainment, A24, Stoller Global Solutions, Lunch Bag Snail Productions and Universal Television	
Life in Pieces	Sitcom	September 21, 2015	June 27, 2019	4	CBS	Kapital Entertainment and 40 or 50 Years, Inc.	
Minority Report	Science fiction	September 21, 2015	November 30, 2015	1	Fox	Amblin Television and Paramount Television	Based on the 2002 film of the same name by 20th Century Fox and DreamWorks Pictures
Scream Queens	Horror	September 22, 2015	December 20, 2016	2	Fox	Prospect Films, Brad Falchuk Teley-Vision and Ryan Murphy Television	
Rosewood	Procedural drama	September 23, 2015	April 28, 2017	2	Fox	Temple Hill Productions and Nickels Productions	
Grandfathered	Sitcom	September 29, 2015	May 10, 2016	1	Fox	Rhode Island Ave. Productions, Consolidated Chunworks and ABC Studios	
The Grinder	Sitcom	September 29, 2015	May 10, 2016	1	Fox	Paul Mogel Network Television, Stoller Global Solutions and The Detective Agency	
Bordertown	Animated sitcom	January 3, 2016	May 22, 2016	1	Fox	Hentemann Films, Bento Box Entertainment and Fuzzy Door Productions	
Cooper Barrett's Guide to Surviving Life	Sitcom	January 3, 2016	June 26, 2016	1	Fox	Lansdowne Productions, Big Time Show Biz Entertainment and The Jackal Group	
Second Chance	Science fiction	January 13, 2016	March 25, 2016	1	Fox	Teakwood Lane Productions and Kara Inc.	
Son of Zorn	Sitcom	September 11, 2016	February 19, 2017	1	Fox	Agnew Jorné Productions and Lord Miller Productions	Animation/live-action hybrid
Speechless	Sitcom	September 21, 2016	April 12, 2019	3	ABC	Silver & Gold Productions, The Detective Agency and ABC Studios	
Pitch	Sports drama	September 22, 2016	December 8, 2016	1	Fox	Barnstorm Films, Left Coast Productions and Rhode Island Ave. Productions	
The Exorcist	Horror	September 23, 2016	December 15, 2017	2	Fox	Morgan Creek Productions and New Neighborhood Productions (season 1)	Based on the 1973 film of the same name by Warner Bros. Pictures
Star	Drama	December 14, 2016	May 8, 2019	3	Fox	Lee Daniels Entertainment	
The Mick	Sitcom	January 1, 2017	April 3, 2018	2	Fox	3 Arts Entertainment and Bingbangboom Productions	
24: Legacy	Action	February 5, 2017	April 17, 2017	1	Fox	Coto/Katz Productions, Imagine Television and Teakwood Lane Productions	revival of 24
APB	Police drama	February 6, 2017	April 24, 2017	1	Fox	Bungalow Media + Entertainment, Sketch Films and Flying Glass of Milk Productions	
Making History	Sitcom	March 5, 2017	May 21, 2017	1	Fox	Julius Sharpe International Petroleum and Writing and Lord Miller Productions	
Shots Fired	Crime drama	March 22, 2017	May 24, 2017	1	Fox	Undisputed Cinema and Imagine Television	
Ghosted	Horror-comedy	October 1, 2017	July 22, 2018	1	Fox	Crowley Etten Productions, Afternoonnap, Additional Dialogue, TYPO, Inc., Gettin' Rad Productions and 3 Arts Entertainment	
The Gifted	Superhero drama	October 2, 2017	February 26, 2019	2	Fox	Flying Glass of Milk Productions, Bad Hat Harry Productions, Kinberg Genre, The Donners' Company and Marvel Television	based on X-Men
LA to Vegas	Sitcom	January 2, 2018	May 1, 2018	1	Fox	Briskets Big Yellow House, Gary Sanchez Productions and Steven Levitan Productions	
Rel	Sitcom	September 9, 2018	January 13, 2019	1	Fox	Morningside Entertainment, REL Event Productions, Scully Productions, JMMLG, and Bird Lugger	
Single Parents	Sitcom	September 26, 2018	May 13, 2020	2	ABC	Elizabeth Meriwether Pictures, JJ Philbin Productions and ABC Studios	
The Cool Kids	Sitcom	September 28, 2018	May 10, 2019	1	Fox	RCG Productions, NestEgg Productions, Enrico Pallazzo, 3 Arts Entertainment and FX Productions	
The Passage	Science fiction	January 14, 2019	March 11, 2019	1	Fox	6th & Idaho, Selfish Mermaid and Scott Free Productions	
Proven Innocent	Legal drama	February 15, 2019	May 10, 2019	1	Fox	Danny Strong Productions and Leap Boy Productions	
Bless This Mess	Sitcom	April 16, 2019	May 5, 2020	2	ABC	Elizabeth Meriwether Pictures, Lake Bell Prod. and ABC Studios	
What Just Happened??! with Fred Savage	Variety	June 30, 2019	September 1, 2019	1	Fox	The Crest Lamp Company, Double Hemm and Fox Entertainment	
Perfect Harmony	Sitcom	September 26, 2019	January 23, 2020	1	NBC	Hungry Mule Amusement Corp., Introvert Hangover Productions, Small Dog Picture Company and Universal Television	
Soundtrack	Musical drama	December 18, 2019		1	Netflix	Annapurna Television and Random Acts Productions	Originally produced for Fox
Outmatched	Sitcom	January 23, 2020	March 26, 2020	1	Fox	Briskets Big Yellow House and Fox Entertainment	
Hoops	Animated sitcom	August 21, 2020		1	Netflix	Pepper Hill Productions, Walcott Company, Lord Miller Productions and Bento Box Entertainment	
20th Television (2020–present)
The Amazing Race	Competition	September 5, 2001	Present	39	CBS	Jerry Bruckheimer Television, Earthview, inc., Worldrace Productions, Amazing Race Productions and CBS Studios	Transferred from ABC Signature in October 2024
Jimmy Kimmel Live!	Talk	January 26, 2003	Present	24	ABC	Kimmelot	Transferred from ABC Signature in October 2024
Grey's Anatomy	Medical drama	March 27, 2005	Present	23	ABC	Shondaland and Lionsgate Television	Transferred from ABC Signature in October 2024
Criminal Minds	Crime drama	September 22, 2005	Present	19	CBS (Seasons 1–15); Paramount+ (Season 16–)	Lionsgate Television, Erica Messer Productions and CBS Studios	Subtitled "Evolution" for Paramount+ run; transferred from ABC Signature in October 2024
American Horror Story	Horror	October 5, 2011	Present	13	FX	Brad Falchuk Teley-Vision and Ryan Murphy Television	credited as 20th Century Fox Television thru season 9
Last Man Standing	Sitcom	October 11, 2011	May 20, 2021	9	ABC (Seasons 1–6); Fox (seasons 7–9)	21 Laps-Adelstein Productions, Double Wide Productions (season 1), Mr. Big Shot Fancy-Pants Productions (seasons 2–4), Lyonberry Productions (seasons 5–6) and NestEgg Productions (seasons 7–9)	credited as 20th Century Fox Television thru season 8
American Crime Story	Crime drama	February 2, 2016	November 9, 2021	3	FX	Scott & Larry Productions (season 1), Color Force, Ryan Murphy Television and FXP	Took over production from Touchstone Television after first two seasons
Queen of the South	Crime drama	June 29, 2016	June 9, 2021	5	USA	Frequency Films (season 1), Friendly Films, Skeeter Rosenbaum Productions (season 1) and Universal Content Productions	Took over production from Touchstone Television after first four seasons
This Is Us	Dramedy	September 20, 2016	May 24, 2022	6	NBC	Rhode Island Ave. Productions and Zaftig Films	Credited as 20th Century Fox Television thru season 4
Feud	Drama	March 5, 2017	March 13, 2024	2	FX	Sawtooth Film Co. (season 2-present), Plan B Entertainment, Scratchpad (season 2-present) and Ryan Murphy Television	Took over production from Touchstone Television after first season
Genius	Biographical drama	April 25, 2017	March 13, 2024	4	National Geographic	EUE / Sokolow Entertainment, Imagine Television Studios, MWM Studios, Paperboy Productions, Warner Music Entertainment (Season 3) and Tumbleweed Productions (Season 3–present)	Took over production from Touchstone Television after first two seasons
The Orville	Science fiction	September 10, 2017	August 4, 2022	3	Fox (Seasons 1–2); Hulu (Season 3)	Fuzzy Door Productions	Credited as 20th Century Fox Television thru season 2; subtitled "New Horizons" for season 3
9-1-1	Procedural drama	January 3, 2018	Present	10	Fox (Seasons 1–6); ABC (Seasons 7-)	Reamworks, Brad Falchuk Teley-Vision and Ryan Murphy Television	Credited as 20th Century Fox Television thru season 3
The Chi	Drama	January 7, 2018	July 26, 2026	8	Showtime	Elwood Reid Inc. (season 1), Hillman Grad Productions, Freedom Road Productions (seasons 1–4), id8 mm. (season 5–), Verse Productions, Kapital Entertainment and Showtime Networks	Took over production from Touchstone Television after first three seasons; last three seasons released early on Paramount+
The Resident	Medical drama	January 21, 2018	January 17, 2023	6	Fox	Fuqua Films, 3 Arts Entertainment, Nickels Productions (season 2–6) and Up Island Films	Credited as 20th Century Fox Television thru season 3
Pose	Period drama	June 3, 2018	June 6, 2021	3	FX	Color Force, Brad Falchuk Teley-Vision, Ryan Murphy Television and FX Productions	Took over production from Touchstone Television after first two seasons
Mayans M.C.	Crime drama	September 4, 2018	July 19, 2023	5	FX	Sutter Ink and FX Productions	Took over production from Touchstone Television after first two seasons; spin-off of Sons of Anarchy
The Rookie	Police drama	October 16, 2018	Present	8	ABC	Lionsgate Television and Perfectman Pictures	First six seasons produced by ABC Signature
The Hot Zone	Anthology	May 27, 2019	November 30, 2021	2	National Geographic	Lynda Obst Productions, Scott Free Productions and Peterson/Souders	Took over production from Touchstone Television after first season
Wu-Tang: An American Saga	Drama	September 4, 2019	April 5, 2023	3	Hulu	RZA Productions, Minute Drill Productions and Imagine Television Studios	Production company since season 2
Bless the Harts	Animated sitcom	September 29, 2019	June 20, 2021	2	Fox	Jessebean, Inc., Lord Miller Productions, Fox Entertainment and Titmouse, Inc.	Credited as 20th Century Fox Television for season 1
Godfather of Harlem	Mafia drama	September 29, 2019	Present	4	Epix (Seasons 1–2); MGM+ (Season 3)	Chris Brancato Inc. and Significant Productions	First three seasons produced by ABC Signature
9-1-1: Lone Star	Procedural drama	January 19, 2020	February 3, 2025	5	Fox	Reamworks, Brad Falchuk Teley-Vision and Ryan Murphy Television	Credited as 20th Century Fox Television for season 1; Spin-off of 9-1-1
Love, Victor	Romantic dramedy	June 17, 2020	June 15, 2022	3	Hulu	Temple Hill Entertainment, No Helmet Productions and The Walk-Up Company	Credited as 20th Century Fox Television for season 1; Based on Love, Simon by 20th Century Fox and Fox 2000 Pictures; Originally developed for Disney+, which added the series on the same day as the third season's debut on Hulu
Filthy Rich	Drama	September 21, 2020	November 30, 2020	1	Fox	Imagine Television Studios, Wyolah Entertainment and Fox Entertainment	Based on the New Zealand series
Next	Science fiction	October 6, 2020	December 22, 2020	1	Fox	Manny Coto Productions, Zaftig Films and Fox Entertainment	
Big Sky	Crime drama	November 17, 2020	January 18, 2023	3	ABC	Fineman Entertainment, David E. Kelley Productions and A+E Studios	Subtitled "Deadly Trails" for season 3
The Mysterious Benedict Society	Adventure	June 25, 2021	December 7, 2022	2	Disney+	Slavkin Swimmer Productions, FamilyStyle and Halcyon Studios	Based on the book series of the same name by Trenton Lee Stewart; removed from Disney+ on May 26, 2023
American Horror Stories	Horror	July 15, 2021	Present	3	FX on Hulu	Brad Falchuk Teley-Vision and Ryan Murphy Television	Spin-off of American Horror Story
Turner & Hooch	Procedural dramedy	July 21, 2021	October 6, 2021	1	Disney+	Flying Glass of Milk Productions and Wonderland Sound and Vision	Based on the 1989 film of the same name by Touchstone Pictures; removed from Disney+ on May 26, 2023
The Prince	Animated sitcom	July 29, 2021		1	HBO Max	Nickleby, Inc. and Bento Box Entertainment	
Only Murders in the Building	Comedy-mystery	August 31, 2021	Present	6	Hulu	Rhode Island Ave. Productions, Another Hoffman Story Productions and 40 Share Productions	Titled Only Murders in London for season six
Doogie Kameāloha, M.D.	Medical dramedy	September 8, 2021	March 31, 2023	2	Disney+	Kang-Rosenblatt Productions, The Detective Agency and Steven Bochco Productions	Based on Doogie Howser, M.D.
The Big Leap	Dramedy	September 20, 2021	December 6, 2021	1	Fox	Naegle Ink, Small Dog Picture Company, Selfish Mermaid and Fox Entertainment	
Ordinary Joe	Drama	September 20, 2021	January 24, 2022	1	NBC	Universal Television, Friend & Lerner Productions, 6th & Idaho and 3 Arts Entertainment	
Our Kind of People	Drama	September 21, 2021	January 25, 2022	1	Fox	Lee Daniels Entertainment, Electus, The Gist of It Productions and Fox Entertainment	
The Wonder Years	Sitcom	September 22, 2021	August 16, 2023	2	ABC	Lee Daniels Entertainment, Matthew 6:33 and The Crest Lamp Company	Based on the 1988 series of the same name
Dopesick	Drama	October 13, 2021	November 17, 2021	1	Hulu	Danny Strong Productions, John Goldwyn Productions and The Littlefield Company	Limited series; originally developed for Fox 21 Television Studios
Just Beyond	Anthology	October 13, 2021		1	Disney+	KatzSmith Productions and Boom! Studios	Removed from Disney+ on May 26, 2023
Abbott Elementary	Sitcom	December 7, 2021	Present	6	ABC	Delicious Non-Sequitur Productions, Fifth Chance (season 2-) and Warner Bros. Television Studios	
How I Met Your Father	Sitcom	January 18, 2022	July 11, 2023	2	Hulu	Bays Thomas Productions and The Walk-Up Company	Inspired by How I Met Your Mother
Single Drunk Female	Dramedy	January 20, 2022	May 10, 2023	2	Freeform	Jenni Konner Productions, Shoot to Midnight and 8th in State Productions	
The Dropout	Drama	March 3, 2022	April 7, 2022	1	Hulu	Searchlight Television, Semi-Formal Productions and Elizabeth Meriwether Pictures	Limited series
Candy	Drama	May 9, 2022	May 13, 2022	1	Hulu	Iron Ocean Films, Eat the Cat, Boss Clown Productions and Universal Content Productions	Limited series
The Old Man	Thriller	June 16, 2022	October 24, 2024	2	FX	Quaker Moving Pictures and The Littlefield Company	Based on the novel of the same name; Originally developed for Fox 21 Television Studios
Maggie	Sitcom	July 6, 2022		1	Hulu	40 or 50 Years, Inc. and Hen of the Woods	Originally picked up by ABC; removed from Hulu on May 26, 2023
Bad Sisters	Dark comedy	August 19, 2022	Present	2	Apple TV	Merman Productions and Caviar Films	First season produced by ABC Signature
Mike	Drama	August 25, 2022	September 15, 2022	1	Hulu	Clubhouse Pictures, Entertainment 360, The Gist of It, Anthony Hemingway Productions and LuckyChap Entertainment	Limited series; originally titled Iron Mike
Tell Me Lies	Drama	September 7, 2022	February 17, 2026	3	Hulu	Moppy Productions, Belletrist Productions, Mega Mix, Rebelle Media and Refinery29	Based on the book of the same name
Reboot	Sitcom	September 20, 2022	October 25, 2022	1	Hulu	Steven Levitan Productions	
Reasonable Doubt	Legal drama	September 27, 2022	Present	4	Hulu	Onyx Collective, Good Home Training, Wilmore Films and Simpson Street	First two seasons produced by ABC Signature
Alaska Daily	Newspaper drama	October 6, 2022	March 30, 2023	1	ABC	Co-lab21 and Slow Pony	
The Santa Clauses	Fantasy-comedy	November 16, 2022	December 6, 2023	2	Disney+	Double Wide Productions and Small Dog Picture Company	Based on The Santa Clause by Walt Disney Pictures
Welcome to Chippendales	Drama	November 22, 2022	January 3, 2023	1	Hulu	Limelight, Winter Coat Productions, Jenni Konner Productions and Robert Siegel and Jen Cohn's Production Company	Limited series; originally titled Immigrant
Will Trent	Detective drama	January 3, 2023	Present	4	ABC	3 Arts Entertainment and Selfish Mermaid	Based on the novel series of the same name by Karen Slaughter
Not Dead Yet	Sitcom	February 8, 2023	April 24, 2024	2	ABC	Windsor & Johnson Productions and Wonderland Sound and Vision	Based on the novel Confessions of a Forty-Something F—k Up by Alexandra Potter
The Company You Keep	Drama	February 19, 2023	May 7, 2023	1	ABC	DiVide Pictures, Nickels Productions and Electric Somewhere	Based on the South Korean TV series My Fellow Citizens!
True Lies	Action	March 1, 2023	May 17, 2023	1	CBS	Lightstorm Entertainment, Flying Glass of Milk Productions, Anthony Hemingway Productions and Wonderland Sound and Vision	Based on the 1994 film of the same name by James Cameron
History of the World, Part II	Sketch comedy	March 6, 2023	March 9, 2023	1	Hulu	Searchlight Television, Good At Bizness, Inc., 23 * 34 and Brooksfilms Limited	Sequel to History of the World, Part I
Up Here	Musical romantic comedy	March 24, 2023		1	Hulu	It Takes Two Productions, Old 320 Sycamore Productions and Pyrrhic Victory Productions	Based upon the musical of the same name
The Crossover	Family drama	April 5, 2023		1	Disney+	State Street Pictures, Magicworthy, Big Sea Entertainment and The SpringHill Company	Based on the book of the same name by Kwame Alexander
The Last Thing He Told Me	Mystery	April 14, 2023	Present	2	Apple TV	Hello Sunshine and Parnes Bakery Inc.	Based on the novel of the same name by Laura Dave; second season based on the sequel
American Born Chinese	Action-comedy	May 24, 2023		1	Disney+	Mister John and The Detective Agency	Based on the graphic novel of the same name
Faraway Downs	Drama	November 26, 2023		1	Hulu (U.S); Disney+(Australia)	Bazmark Films	Limited series; released under the 20th Century Studios banner, recut version of Australia by Baz Luhrmann
Percy Jackson and the Olympians	Fantasy	December 19, 2023	Present	3	Disney+	Quaker Moving Pictures, Mythomagic, Co-Lab21 and The Gotham Group	Based on the book series of the same name Originally set up At Fox 21 Television Studios
Tracker	Action	February 11, 2024	Present	4	CBS	Beekeeper Entertainment, After Portsmouth Productions and ChangeUp Productions	Based on The Never Game by Jeffery Deaver
We Were the Lucky Ones	Drama	March 28, 2024	May 2, 2024	1	Hulu	Old 320 Sycamore and Danforth Cove Productions	Limited series; based on the novel of the same name
The Spiderwick Chronicles	Fantasy	April 19, 2024		1	The Roku Channel	Lightbulb Farm Productions, The Gotham Group and Paramount Television Studios	Based on the book series of the same name; originally announced for Disney+
American Sports Story	Sports drama	September 17, 2024	Present	1	FX	Sleeping Indian, Inc., Monarch Pictures, Wondery, The Boston Globe, Color Force and Ryan Murphy Television	
High Potential	Police drama	September 17, 2024	Present	2	ABC	Goddard Textiles, Spondoolie Productions and Taft Tennis	Based on the French television series Haut Potentiel Intellectuel (HPI) by Nicolas Jean, Stéphane Carrié and Alice Chegaray-Breugnot; took over production following the closure of ABC Signature on October 1, 2024.
Grotesquerie	Horror drama	September 25, 2024	October 30, 2024	1	FX	Ryan Murphy Television and Scratchpad	
Doctor Odyssey	Medical drama	September 26, 2024	May 15, 2025	1	ABC	Ryan Murphy Television and Scratchpad	
Nobody Wants This	Romantic comedy	September 26, 2024	Present	3	Netflix	Fatigue Sisters Productions, Levitan Productions, Mr. D Productions, 3 Arts Entertainment, Dunshire Productions, Jenni Konner and BDK Industries BEK Industries	Formerly known as Shiksa
Interior Chinatown	Dramedy	November 19, 2024		1	Hulu	MSD Imaginary Machines, Waititi, Participant and Rideback	Based on the novel of the same name
Shifting Gears	Sitcom	January 8, 2025	Present	2	ABC	Shaky Gun Productions and Lost Marbles	
Paradise	Thriller	January 26, 2025	Present	2	Hulu	Rhode Island Ave. Productions	Originally titled Paradise City
Deli Boys	Crime comedy	March 6, 2025	May 28, 2026	2	Hulu	Onyx Collective, Cold Fusion Industries, Shaky Gun Productions and Jenni Konner Productions	
Good American Family	Drama	March 19, 2025	Present	2	Hulu	Babka Pictures, Calamity Jane, Andrew Stearn Productions, Naptown Productions and Industry Entertainment Partners	Limited series; originally set up at ABC Signature
Mid-Century Modern	Sitcom	March 28, 2025		1	Hulu	KoMut Entertainment and Ryan Murphy Television	
Dying for Sex	Comedy drama	April 4, 2025		1	FX on Hulu	FXP, Elizabeth Meriwether Pictures, Shoot to Midnight and Wondery	Limited series; based on the podcast of the same name; originally in the works for FX
Washington Black	Historical drama	July 23, 2025		1	Hulu	Indian Meadows Productions and The Gotham Group	Limited series; based on the novel of the same name
The Twisted Tale of Amanda Knox	Drama	August 20, 2025	October 1, 2025	1	Hulu	The Littlefield Company, Good Talk Productions and Knox Robinson Productions	Limited series
Chad Powers	Sports comedy	September 30, 2025	Present	2	Hulu	ESPN, Omaha Productions and Anomaly Pictures	Based on the ESPN segment "Eli's Places"
9-1-1: Nashville	Procedural drama	October 9, 2025	Present	2	ABC	Ryan Murphy Television and User Error Productions	Second spin-off of 9-1-1
All's Fair	Legal drama	November 4, 2025	Present	2	Hulu	Ryan Murphy Television and Trillium Productions	
The Beast in Me	Mystery thriller	November 13, 2025	Present	2	Netflix	Teakwood Lane Productions, Overall Production and Conaco	
The Beauty	Sci-fi horror	January 21, 2026	March 4, 2026	1	FX/Hulu	Ryan Murphy Productions	Based on the comic book series of the same name
Love Story	Romantic drama	February 12, 2026	Present	1	FX/Hulu	Color Force and Ryan Murphy Television	Originally titled American Love Story
Scrubs	Sitcom	February 25, 2026	Present	2	ABC	Doozer Productions and Seemu! Inc.	Revival of 2001 series
R.J. Decker	Crime drama	March 3, 2026	Present	2	ABC	Timberman-Beverly Productions	Based on the novel Double Whammy
Vladimir	Black comedy	March 5, 2026		1	Netflix	Merman and Small Dog Picture Company	Based on the novel of the same name
Imperfect Women	Psychological thriller	March 18, 2026	Present	2	Apple TV	Simpson Street, Love & Squalor Pictures and Apple Studios	Based on the novel of the same name
The Testaments	Dystopian drama	April 8, 2026	Present	2	Hulu	Love & Squalor Pictures, The Littlefield Company, White Oak Pictures, Toluca Pictures and Metro-Goldwyn-Mayer Television	Based on the novel of the same name; sequel to The Handmaid's Tale
Malcolm in the Middle: Life's Still Unfair	Comedy	April 10, 2026		1	Hulu	New Regency, The Jackal Group, and New Satin City Productions	Limited series; continuation of Malcolm in the Middle
Furious	Thriller	July 27, 2026	Present	1	Hulu	Searchlight Television, Composition 8 and Elizabeth Meriwether Pictures	Based on Black Widow
The Shards	Thriller	August 5, 2026	Present	1	FX/Hulu	Ryan Murphy Productions	Based on the novel of the same name
Phony	Comedy-mystery	October 20, 2026	Present	1	Hulu	Goddard Textiles, and Delby Films and Charlie's Production Company and Young Monk Productions	Originally set up at ABC Signature
Trinity	Thriller	December 1, 2026		1	Netflix	Hat Trick Mercurio	
The Rookie: North	Police drama	January 6, 2027			ABC	Lionsgate Television	Second spin-off of The Rookie after Feds
The Spot	Psychological Thriller	January 13, 2027			Hulu	A24 and Juggle Productions	
She's Fine	Comedy	January 27, 2027			Apple TV	Selfish Mermaid, Brownstone Productions and Small Dog Picture Company	Originally titled We're All Gonna Die
The Land	Sports drama	February 15, 2027			Hulu	Skydance Sports, NFL Films and Rhode Island Ave. Productions	
Untitled Grey's Anatomy spin-off	Medical drama	2027			ABC	Shondaland	Third spin-off of Grey's Anatomy after Private Practice and Station 19
Legends	Thriller			1	FX/Hulu	FX Productions	Limited series; inspired by Sons of Anarchy
28 Summers	Drama					Dinner Party	Based on novel of the same name
1266	Comedy				Hulu	Onyx Collective	
The Advocate	Legal drama				ABC	The Walk-Up Company	
All Fine	Workplace comedy				ABC	David E. Kelley Productions and Huntley Productions	
All the Secrets of the World	Thriller				Fox	Gotham Group	Based on the novel of the same name
Animorphs	Science fiction				Disney+	Proximity Media and Scholastic Corporation	Based on the book series of the same name
The Answers	Science fiction				FX	Danny Strong Productions and Protozoa Pictures	Based on the novel of the same name
Bachelorette Weekend	Thriller				Hulu	Kapital Entertainment	
Bastards	Drama				Hulu		
Before I Forget	Drama				Amazon Prime Video	UnbeliEVAble Entertainment	
The Bends	Thriller				FX	The Littlefield Company	Based on the novel Killing Ground
Best Offer Wins	Drama				Hulu	Entertainment 360	Based on the novel of the same name
Big Fan	Romance				Hulu	831 Stories	Based on the novel of the same name
Bride Wars	Comedy				Peacock	New Regency, Bellestrist and Universal Content Productions	Based on the film of the same name
C-League	Comedy				Hulu		
Candygram	Spy drama				ABC	Rebelle Media	
Capsized	Thriller				Hulu		Based on novel of the same name
Chicks	Dramedy				Hulu	Calamity Jane	
Con Law	Legal drama				ABC	Linden Productions	
Confessions On The 7:45	Thriller				Hulu	Lady Metalmark Entertainment, Hyphenate Media Group and 3 Arts Entertainment	Based on the novel of the same name
Conviction	Legal drama				Hulu	Co-Lab21, Shore Z Productions, The Littlefield Co. and Love & Squalor Pictures	Based on the novel of the same name
Count My Lies	Drama				Hulu	The Walk-Up Company	Based on the novel of the same name
The Curse Workers	Fantasy				Disney+	Gotham Group	Based on the novel of the same name
Deception	Drama				Hulu		Based on the novel of the same name
Devil's Ranch	Military drama				ABC	Underground	
Dive	Police drama				ABC	Seven Bucks	
Double or Nothing	Comedy				Hulu	Good World Productions and Adventure Media Productions	
Durango	Drama				Hulu	Media Res	
Eragon	Fantasy				Disney+	Co-Lab 21	Based on the book of the same name
Everflame	Romantic fantasy				Hulu		Based on the novel Spark of the Everflame
The Farm	Family drama				Fox	DiVide Pictures and Fox Entertainment	
First Gen	Sitcom				Disney+	Harpo Productions and Yoruba Saxon Productions	
A Forgotten Kill	Crime drama				ABC	Change Up Productions	Based on novel of the same name
The Growing Season	Drama				ABC	Danny Strong Productions	
Happy for You	Sitcom				ABC		
The Haunting of Alejandra	Thriller				Hulu	Hyphenate Media Group and Luchagore	Based on the novel of the same name
Hip Hop Cop	Police drama				Hulu	G-Unit Film & Television and Hyde Park Entertainment Group	Based on The Gangs of Zion
Hometown Saints	Sports drama				NBC	DiVide Pictures	
Hopeless	Romantic comedy				FX	More Better Productions and 3 Arts Entertainment	
In the End	Drama				ABC	Story Ave. Productions	
Judgment	Legal drama				ABC	The Detective Agency and Mosaic	
Just One Day	Romance				Hulu	PKM Productions	Based on the book series; originally set up at Amazon
The Kane Chronicles	Fantasy				Disney+		Based on the book series
Killer Class	Crime drama				ABC	In Cahoots and Absecon Entertainment	
King of Ashes	Crime drama				FX	Amblin and Higher Ground	Based on the novel of the same name
Last Look	Comedy				Hulu	Waititi Productions	
Last Second Chance	Fantasy comedy				Hulu	Rideback and Firece Baby Productions	Based on the Japanese series Rebooting
Lex	Comedy				Hulu		
The Mafia Nanny	Drama				Hulu	Secret Menu, Steady Collective and Webtoon Productions	Based on Webtoon of the same name
Malibu Rising	Drama				Hulu	Best Day Ever Productions and Circle of Confusion	
Mason Dixon	Drama				ABC	Lee Daniels Entertainment	
The Midcoast	Drama				Hulu	The Littlefield Company	Based on the novel of the same name
Monkey Boy	Drama				Hulu	Onyx Collective and Basset Vance Productions	Based on the novel of the same name
Mosquito	Black Comedy				Hulu	Piggy Ate Roast Beef Productions and Hustle & Punch	
The Motherload	Drama					The Gotham Group	Based on the memoir The Motherload: Episodes From the Brink of Motherhood
Movers	Comedy				FX		
My Mom Has No Friends	Comedy				Fox	Roll With the Punches Productions and The Walk Up Company	
Nate's	Comedy				ABC	3 Arts Entertainment	
Nepo Baby	Comedy				Hulu	Artists First	
No Good Deed	Drama				ABC	ChangeUp Productions	
Not a Sound	Drama				Hulu	David E. Kelley Productions and Calamity Jane	Based on the novel of the same name
Only to Deceive	Drama				ABC	DiVide Pictures	Based on novel And Only to Deceive
Out There	Dramedy				Hulu	The Small Dog Picture Company	
Overtime	Sitcom				ABC	Golden Alchemy Entertainment and The Littlefield Company	
Paola Santiago and the River of Tears	Fantasy adventure				Disney+	UnbeliEVAble Entertainment	
The Pinnacle	Real estate drama				Hulu	Bedby8 and Hustle & Punch	
Please See HR	Workplace comedy				Hulu	Five All In The Fifth and Underground	
The Poison Daughter	Romantic fantasy				Hulu		Based on the novel of the same name
Pretty Ugly	Comedy				Hulu	Kapital Entertainment	Based on the novel of the same name
Prison Break: Black Creek	Crime drama				Hulu		
Rabbit	Drama				ABC	Big Talk Studios	Based on Ludwig
The Ram	Workplace romantic comedy				ABC	Tannenbaum Co. and Omaha Productions	
Real Steel	Science fiction				Disney+	21 Laps Entertainment	Based on the 2011 film of the same name by Touchstone Pictures and DreamWorks Pictures
Redemption	Drama					The Littlefield Co, Co-Lab 21 and Riff Raff Entertainment	Based on the novel of the same name
Relatable	Sitcom				ABC	Thruline Entertainment; Crush Music	Based on the life of Alanis Morissette
RetroActive	Science fiction				Hulu	MGM Television	Based on the graphic novel of the same name
The Ring & the Crown	Fantasy				Disney+	The Gotham Group and 3 Arts Entertainment	Based on the book of the same name
Roman Law	Legal drama				ABC		
The Rumor	Drama					Dinner Party	Based on novel of the same name
Second Wife	Romantic dramedy				Hulu	Belletrist TV	
Secret Guide to Celestial Creatures	Fantasy				Disney+	Imminent Collision	
A Sociopath's Guide to a Successful Marriage	Dark comedy mystery				Hulu	Best Day Ever	Based on the novel of the same name
Spaceship Earth	Science fiction				Disney+	Five Ten Productions and Anomaly Pictures	Based on the EPCOT ride of the same name
The Spook Who Sat by the Door	Spy drama				FX	Lee Daniels Entertainment	Based on the novel of the same name
Spy School	Spy drama				Disney+	Maximum Effort	Based on the book series
The Summer of Songbirds						Kapital Entertainment	Based on the novel of the same name
Suspect	Detective drama					MGM Television	Based on the novel of the same name
Take Out	Action-comedy					Imminent Collision	
That Texas Blood	Drama				FX	Anomaly Pictures	Based on comic of the same name
These Summer Storms	Drama				Hulu	Fatigue Sisters and 3 Arts Entertainment	Based on the novel of the same name
This Is Our Year	Sitcom				CBS		
Thornbird	Thriller				Hulu		Based on the novel of the same name
Tink	Drama				Disney+	Selfish Mermaid	Based on Tinker Bell
Townhouse	Comdey				Hulu		
Trap Queen	Drama				Freeform	Danny Strong Productions and SB Projects	
Twin Flames	Romantic comedy				Hulu	Roll With The Punches Productions and The Walk Up Company	Based on the podcast of the same name
Under Pressure	Medical drama				ABC	Shore Z Productions, Paper Plane Productions and Conspiração	Based on Sob Pressão
The Undertaker	Police drama				ABC	Elevate Entertainment	Based on Der Bestatter
Untitled Ayesha Carr series	Drama				ABC	Altura Productions	
Untitled Destination Wedding series	Romantic comedy				Hulu	Fatigue Sisters Productions and 3Arts Entertainment	
Untitled Detective Guido Brunetti series	Drama				Fox		
Untitled Figure Skating Comedy	Sitcom				NBC		
Untitled Grace Parra Project	Sitcom				ABC	UnbeliEVAble Entertainment	
Untitled Jake Shane series	Sitcom				Hulu		
Untitled Kimberly Belflower series	Drama					Old 320 Sycamore	
Untitled Muslim-American comedy	Sitcom				ABC		
Untitled Peter Ackerman Project	Sitcom				ABC	Kapital Entertainment and TrillTV	
Untitled Sabrina Jalees Project	Sitcom				ABC		
Untitled Tracy Oliver Project	Comedy				Hulu		
Very Young Frankenstein	Horror comedy				FX		Based on Young Frankenstein
Vital Signs	Drama				ABC	Kapital Entertainment	
Waiting to Exhale	Drama				ABC	3 Arts Entertainment and Lee Daniels Entertainment	Based on the 1995 film of the same name by 20th Century Fox
What Remains	Drama				Hulu	Simpson Street, Wonderland Sound & Vision and Kapital Entertainment	Based on the novel of the same name
Wild Rabbit	Drama				Hulu	Fremantle and Passenger	
Wildwood	Comedy				Hulu	FX	
Wisteria Lane	Black comedy					Onyx Collective, Shiny Penny and Simpson Street	Spin-off of Desperate Housewives
Worst House on the Block	Sitcom				ABC	3 Arts Entertainment	
Wyrd	Science fiction				FX	Dark Horse Entertainment, FX Productions and Vendetta Productions	
The X-Files	Science fiction				Hulu	Proximity Media and Onyx Collective	Reboot of earlier series
XYZ	Sitcom				ABC		
You Deserve to Know	Drama				Hulu	Unwell Productions and Kapital Entertainment	Based on the novel of the same name
Young Americans	Drama				Hulu	White Oak Pictures	

==== Touchstone Television ====
Also includes productions from Fox Television Studios, Fox 21 Television Studios and Fox 21. Now absorbed into 20th Television.

Title	Genre	First air date	Last air date	No. of seasons	Network	Production company(s)	Notes
Fox Television Studios (1997–2014)
The Hughleys	Sitcom	September 22, 1998	May 20, 2002	4	ABC (seasons 1-2); UPN (seasons 3-4)	The Greenblatt/Janollari Studio and Willowick Entertainment	
Maggie Winters	Sitcom	September 30, 1998	February 3, 1999	1	CBS	The Greenblatt/Janollari Studio and CBS Productions	
To Have & to Hold	Drama	September 30, 1998	December 9, 1998	1	CBS	The Greenblatt/Janollari Studio and CBS Productions	
Fast Food Films	Variety show	March 6, 1999	September 28, 1999	1	FX	Gold Coast Television Entertainment	
The X Show	Magazine series	May 31, 1999	April 2001	2	FX	Mindless Entertainment	
Oh, Grow Up	Sitcom	September 22, 1999	December 28, 1999	1	ABC	The Greenblatt/Janollari Studio	
Ryan Caulfield: Year One	Sitcom	October 15, 1999	October 22, 1999	1	Fox	Mandeville Films and Regency Television	
Malcolm in the Middle	Sitcom	January 9, 2000	May 14, 2006	7	Fox	Satin City and Regency Television	
Son of the Beach	Sitcom	March 14, 2000	October 1, 2002	3	FX	The Howard Stern Production Company and Loch Lomond Entertainment	
Soul Food: The Series	Drama	June 28, 2000	May 26, 2004	5	Showtime	Water Walk Productions, Edmonds Entertainment, State Street Pictures, 20th Century Fox Television, Showtime Networks and Paramount Network Television	Based on the 1997 film of the same name
Backstory	Documentary	August 12, 2000	January 20, 2005	5	AMC	Phometheus Entertainment, Van Ness Films and Foxstar Productions	
Murder in Small Town X	Reality	July 24, 2001	September 4, 2001	1	Fox	Hoosick Falls Productions	
Beat the Geeks	Game show	November 7, 2001	October 7, 2002	2	Comedy Central	Mindless Entertainment	
The Shield	Police drama	March 12, 2002	November 25, 2008	7	FX	MiddKid Productions, Columbia TriStar Domestic Television and Sony Pictures Television	
John Doe	Science fiction	September 20, 2002	April 25, 2003	1	Fox	Camp-Thompson Productions and Regency Television	
The Grid	Thriller	July 19, 2004	August 9, 2004	1	TNT	Groveland Pictures and Carnival Films	Miniseries; aired on BBC Two in the UK
Listen Up	Sitcom	September 20, 2004	April 25, 2005	1	CBS	Regency Television and CBS Productions	Distributed in the US by CBS Media Ventures
Living with Fran	Sitcom	April 8, 2005	March 24, 2006	2	The WB	Fringe Producers, On Time and Sober, Jizzy Entertainment, Uh-Oh Productions and Regency Television	
The Girls Next Door	Reality	August 7, 2005	August 8, 2010	6	E!	Prometheus Entertainment and Alta Loma Entertainment	
Killer Instinct	Crime drama	September 23, 2005	December 2, 2005	1	Fox	Regency Television	
Cheerleader Nation	Reality	March 12, 2006	May 28, 2006	1	Lifetime	Swim Entertainment	
Thief	Crime drama	March 28, 2006	May 2, 2006	1	FX	Pariah Television, Sarabande Productions and Regency Television	miniseries
Windfall	Drama	June 8, 2006	August 31, 2006	1	NBC	Joyful Girl Productions and Regency Television	
Celebrity Duets	Reality	August 29, 2006	September 29, 2006	1	Fox	SYCOtv, Michael Levitt Productions and A. Smith & Co. Productions	
The Riches	Drama	March 12, 2007	April 29, 2008	2	FX	Maverick Television and FX Productions	
Burn Notice	Action	June 28, 2007	September 12, 2013	7	USA	Flying Glass of Milk Productions, Fuse Entertainment and Fabrik Entertainment	
Saving Grace	Fantasy	July 23, 2007	June 21, 2010	4	TNT	Grand Productions and Paid My Dues Productions	
Crowned: The Mother of All Pageants	Reality	December 13, 2007	January 30, 2008	1	The CW	Swim Entertainment	
The Return of Jezebel James	Sitcom	March 14, 2008	March 21, 2008	1	Fox	Dorothy Parker Drank Here Productions and Regency Television	
Mental	Medical drama	May 26, 2009	August 14, 2009	1	Fox	Kedzie Productions and Infinity Pictures	
Kendra	Reality	June 7, 2009	November 20, 2011	4	E!	Prometheus Entertainment and Alta Loma Entertainment	
Defying Gravity	Science fiction	August 2, 2009	October 23, 2009	1	ABC	Parriott/Edelstein Productions and Omni Film Productions	aired on CTV in Canada
White Collar	Crime drama	October 23, 2009	December 18, 2014	6	USA	Jeff Eastin & Warrior George Productions	
The Wanda Sykes Show	Talk show	November 7, 2009	April 24, 2010	1	Fox	Sykes Entertainment, Inc.	
Holly's World	Reality	December 6, 2009	April 3, 2011	2	E!	Prometheus Entertainment and Alta Loma Entertainment	
The Good Guys	Police dramedy	May 19, 2010	December 10, 2010	1	Fox	Flying Glass of Milk Productions and Fuse Entertainment	
Persons Unknown	Mystery	June 7, 2010	August 28, 2010	1	NBC	Invisible Ink and Televisa S.A. de C.V.	
The Gates	Supernatural drama	June 20, 2010	September 19, 2010	1	ABC	Little Engine Productions and Summerland Entertainment	
The Glades	Crime drama	July 11, 2010	August 26, 2013	4	A&E	Innuendo Productions and Grand Productions	
Lights Out	Drama	January 11, 2011	April 5, 2011	1	FX	A Warren Leight Production, Fineman Entertainment and FX Productions	
The Killing	Crime drama	April 3, 2011	August 1, 2014	4	AMC (Seasons 1-3); Netflix (Season 4)	KMF Films, Fuse Entertainment and Fabrik Entertainment	
In the Flow with Affion Crockett	Sketch comedy	August 14, 2011	September 11, 2011	1	Fox	Foxx/King Entertainment and Tantamount Studios	
The Great Escape	Reality	June 24, 2012	August 26, 2012	1	TNT	Profiles Television Productions, The Hochberg Ebersol Company and Imagine Television	
The Americans	Espionage	January 30, 2013	May 30, 2018	6	FX	Nemo Films, Amblin Television and FX Productions	
Maron	Sitcom	May 3, 2013	July 13, 2016	4	IFC	Boomer Lives! Productions and Apostle	
Graceland	Action	June 6, 2013	September 17, 2015	3	USA	Jeff Eastin & Warrior George Productions	
Sirens	Sitcom	March 6, 2014	April 14, 2015	2	USA	Middletown News and Apostle	based on the British series of the same name
Life Flight: Trauma Center Houston	Reality	February 16, 2015	March 16, 2015	1	Lifetime	The Boardwalk Entertainment Group	
Fox 21 (2004–2014)
Beauty and the Geek	Reality	June 1, 2005	May 13, 2008	5	The WB (seasons 1–2); The CW (seasons 3–5)	Katalyst Films and 3 Ball Productions	
Free Ride	Sitcom	March 1, 2006	April 9, 2006	1	Fox	Rob Roy Thomas Productions and Wild Jams Productions	
Saved	Medical drama	June 12, 2006	September 4, 2006	1	TNT	Sarabande Productions, Brightline Pictures and Imagine Television	
Anchorwoman	Reality	August 22, 2007		1	Fox	The 6 Group	
Sons of Anarchy	Crime drama	September 3, 2008	December 9, 2014	7	FX	Linson The Company, Sutter Ink and FX Productions	
Game Show in My Head	Game show	January 3, 2009	January 24, 2009	1	CBS	Hat Trick Productions and Katalyst Films	
Terriers	Dramedy	September 8, 2010	December 1, 2010	1	FX	MiddKid Productions and Rickshaw Productions	
Breakout Kings	Crime drama	March 6, 2011	April 29, 2012	2	A&E	Matt Olmstead Productions, Blackjack Films, and Chernin Entertainment	
Homeland	Thriller	October 2, 2011	April 26, 2020	8	Showtime	Teakwood Lane Productions, Cherry Pie Productions, Keshet Media Group and Showtime Networks	
Brickleberry	Animated sitcom	September 25, 2012	April 14, 2015	3	Comedy Central	Damn! Show Productions and Black Heart Productions	
Witches of East End	Fantasy	October 6, 2013	October 5, 2014	2	Lifetime	3 Arts Entertainment and Curly Girly Productions	
Those Who Kill	Crime drama	March 3, 2014	May 18, 2014	1	A&E (Episodes 1-2); Lifetime Movie Network (Episodes 3-10)	One Two One Three Pictures, Miso Film, and Imagine Television	
Salem	Horror	April 20, 2014	January 25, 2017	3	WGN America	Beetlecod Productions and Prospect Park	
Tyrant	Political drama	June 24, 2014	September 7, 2016	3	FX	Teakwood Lane Productions, Keshet Media Group and FX Productions	
Rush	Medical drama	July 17, 2014	September 18, 2014	1	USA	Little Engine Productions, Fancy Films and Pine City Entertainment	
Legends	Crime drama	August 13, 2014	December 28, 2015	2	TNT	Paperboy Productions and Teakwood Lane Productions	
Fox 21 Television Studios (2014–2020)
The Comedians	Sitcom	April 9, 2015	June 25, 2015	1	FX	Jennilind Productions, Larry Charles Projects, Tamaroa Productions, Flying Glass of Milk Productions, Fabrik Entertainment and FX Productions	
Complications	Drama	June 18, 2015	August 13, 2015	1	USA	Flying Glass of Milk Productions	
Sex & Drugs & Rock & Roll	Dramedy	July 16, 2015	September 1, 2016	2	FX	Apostle and FX Productions	
The Bastard Executioner	Historical drama	September 15, 2015	November 17, 2015	1	FX	Sutter Ink, Imagine Television and FX Productions	
Damien	Horror	March 7, 2016	May 9, 2016	1	A&E	44 Strong Productions and Fineman Entertainment	based on The Omen
Dice	Sitcom	April 10, 2016	October 8, 2017	2	Showtime	Olé Productions, American Work Inc. and Showtime Networks	
Chance	Psychological thriller	October 19, 2016	November 29, 2017	2	Hulu	Nutmegger, Kem Nunn Stories, Inc., and Groundswell Productions	
Seven Seconds	Crime drama	February 23, 2018		1	Netflix	KMF Films, Bender Brown Productions, and Filmtribe	Limited series
Fosse/Verdon	Biographical drama	April 9, 2019	May 28, 2019	1	FX	5000 Broadway Productions and FX Productions	Limited series
The Politician	Political dramedy	September 27, 2019	June 19, 2020	2	Netflix	Prospect Films, Brad Falchuk Teley-Vision and Ryan Murphy Television	
Soundtrack	Musical drama	December 18, 2019		1	Netflix	Annapurna Television, Random Acts Productions and 20th Century Fox Television	
The Stranger	Thriller	April 13, 2020	April 27, 2020	1	Quibi	KMF Films	
Barkskins	Drama	May 25, 2020	June 15, 2020	1	National Geographic	Elwood Reid Inc.	
Tales from the Loop	Science fiction	April 3, 2020		1	Amazon Prime Video	Amazon Studios, 6th & Idaho and Indio	
Ratched	Psychological thriller	September 18, 2020		1	Netflix	The Saul Zaentz Company and Ryan Murphy Productions	based on One Flew Over the Cuckoo's Nest
Touchstone Television (2020)
Books of Blood	Anthology horror	October 7, 2020			Hulu	20th Century Studios (copyright holder only), Beetlecod Productions, Seraphim Films and Fuzzy Door Productions	based on Books of Blood

==== ABC Signature ====
Title	Genre	First air date	Last air date	No. of seasons	Network	Co-production with	Notes
Touchstone Television (1985–2007)
Wildside	Western	March 21, 1985	April 25, 1985	1	ABC	Tom Greene Productions, Inc.	
The Golden Girls	Sitcom	September 14, 1985	May 9, 1992	7	NBC	Witt/Thomas/Harris Productions	
The Ellen Burstyn Show	Sitcom	September 20, 1986	September 12, 1987	1	ABC	Ellen Burstyn Productions; P.S. 235 Productions	
Harry	Sitcom	March 4, 1987	March 25, 1987	1	ABC		
Down and Out in Beverly Hills	Sitcom	April 26, 1987	September 12, 1987	1	Fox		Based on the 1986 film by Touchstone Films
The Oldest Rookie	Drama	September 16, 1987	January 6, 1988	1	CBS	Gil Grant Productions; Chapman Productions	
Empty Nest	Sitcom	October 8, 1988	June 17, 1995	7	NBC	Witt/Thomas/Harris Productions	
Hard Time on Planet Earth	Science fiction	March 1, 1989	June 21, 1989	1	CBS	Demos-Bard/Shanachie Productions	
The Nutt House	Sitcom	September 20, 1989	October 25, 1989	1	NBC	Brooksfilms Television; Alan Spencer Productions	
Carol & Company	Sketch comedy	March 31, 1990	May 4, 1991	2	NBC	Kalola Productions; Wind Dancer Productions	
Singer & Sons	Sitcom	June 9, 1990	June 27, 1990	1	NBC	Michael Jacobs Productions	
Blossom	Sitcom	July 5, 1990	May 22, 1995	5	NBC	Witt/Thomas Productions; Impact Zone Productions	
Hull High	Musical drama	August 20, 1990	December 30, 1990	1	NBC	Gil Giant Productions	
The Fanelli Boys	Sitcom	September 8, 1990	February 16, 1991	1	NBC	KTMB Productions	
Lenny	Sitcom	September 10, 1990	March 9, 1991	1	CBS	Impact Zone Productions; Witt/Thomas Productions	
Stat	Sitcom	April 16, 1991	May 21, 1991	1	ABC	Tetagram, Ltd.	
Herman's Head	Sitcom	September 8, 1991	April 21, 1994	3	Fox	Witt/Thomas Productions	
Nurses	Sitcom	September 14, 1991	May 7, 1994	3	NBC	Witt/Thomas/Harris Productions	
Pacific Station	Sitcom	September 15, 1991	July 13, 1992	1	NBC	KTMB Productions	
Home Improvement	Sitcom	September 17, 1991	May 25, 1999	8	ABC	Wind Dancer Productions	
Good & Evil	Sitcom	September 25, 1991	October 30, 1991	1	ABC	Witt/Thomas/Harris Productions	
Walter & Emily	Sitcom	November 16, 1991	February 22, 1992	1	NBC	Witt/Thomas Productions	
The Golden Palace	Sitcom	September 18, 1992	June 11, 1993	1	CBS	Witt/Thomas/Harris Productions	
Woops!	Sitcom	September 27, 1992	December 6, 1992	1	Fox	Heartfelt Productions; Witt/Thomas Productions	
Laurie Hill	Sitcom	September 30, 1992	October 28, 1992	1	ABC	The Black/Marlens Company	
Where I Live	Sitcom	March 5, 1993	November 20, 1993	2	ABC	Michael Jacobs Productions	
Cutters	Sitcom	June 11, 1993	July 9, 1993	1	CBS	Turnaround Productions; Grant/Tribune Productions	
Bakersfield P.D.	Sitcom	September 14, 1993	August 18, 1994	1	Fox	Rock Island Productions	
Moon Over Miami	Drama	September 15, 1993	December 1, 1993	1	ABC	Harley Peyton TV; Columbia Pictures Television	
The Sinbad Show		September 16, 1993	April 24, 1994	1	Fox	Michael Jacobs Productions; David & Goliath Productions; Gary Murphy-Larry Strawther Productions	
Boy Meets World		September 24, 1993	May 5, 2000	7	ABC	Michael Jacobs Productions	
Joe's Life		September 29, 1993	December 15, 1993	1	ABC	Bob Myer Productions	
The Good Life		January 3, 1994	April 12, 1994	1	NBC	Interbang, Inc.	
Monty		January 11, 1994	February 15, 1994	1	Fox	Fair Dinkum Productions; Reserve Room Productions	
Thunder Alley		March 9, 1994	July 4, 1995	2	ABC	Wind Dancer Productions	
Someone Like Me		March 14, 1994	April 25, 1994	1	NBC	Sandollar Television; Mohawk Productions	
Ellen		March 29, 1994	July 22, 1998	5	ABC	The Black/Marlens Company	
Hardball		September 4, 1994	October 23, 1994	1	Fox	Interbang, Inc. Magic Beans, Inc.	
All-American Girl		September 14, 1994	March 15, 1995	1	ABC	Sandollar Television; Heartfelt Productions	
Unhappily Ever After		January 11, 1995	May 23, 1999	5	The WB		
The George Wendt Show		March 8, 1995	April 12, 1995	1	CBS	The Cloudland Company	
Pride & Joy		March 21, 1995	May 2, 1995	1	NBC	Reserve Room Productions	
Nowhere Man	Science fiction	August 28, 1995	May 20, 1996	1	UPN	Lawrence Hertzog Productions	
Maybe This Time	Sitcom	September 15, 1995	February 17, 1996	1	ABC	Michael Jacobs Productions	
If Not for You	Sitcom	September 18, 1995	October 9, 1995	1	CBS	Rock Island Productions	
Misery Loves Company	Sitcom	October 1, 1995	October 22, 1995	1	Fox	Michael Jacobs Productions	
Buddies	Sitcom	March 5, 1996	March 27, 1996	1	ABC	Wind Dancer Productions	
The Faculty	Sitcom	March 13, 1996	June 26, 1996	1	ABC	Meredith Baxter Productions; Thompson-Murphy Productions	
Homeboys in Outer Space	Sitcom	August 27, 1996	May 13, 1997	1	UPN	Sweet Lorraine Productions	
Life's Work	Sitcom	September 17, 1996	June 10, 1997	1	ABC	Weest, Inc.	
Dangerous Minds	Drama	September 30, 1996	March 15, 1997	1	ABC	Predawn Productions; Don Simpson/Jerry Bruckheimer Films	Based on the 1995 film by Hollywood Pictures
Social Studies	Sitcom	March 18, 1997	April 22, 1997	1	UPN	Film Fatale, Inc. Sandollar Television	
Soul Man	Sitcom	April 15, 1997	May 26, 1998	2	ABC	Hostage Productions; Wind Dancer Production Group	
Hiller and Diller	Sitcom	September 23, 1997	March 13, 1998	1	ABC	Imagine Television	
Teen Angel	Sitcom	September 26, 1997	February 13, 1998	1	ABC	Spooky Magic Productions	
You Wish	Sitcom	September 26, 1997	June 19, 1998	1	ABC	Michael Jacobs Productions	
Style & Substance	Sitcom	January 5, 1998	September 2, 1998	1	CBS	The Cloudland Company	
Costello	Sitcom	September 15, 1998	October 13, 1998	1	Fox	Wind Dancer Productions	
Sports Night	Sitcom	September 22, 1998	May 16, 2000	2	ABC	Imagine Television	
Felicity	Drama	September 29, 1998	May 22, 2002	4	The WB	Imagine Television	
The Secret Lives of Men	Sitcom	September 30, 1998	November 11, 1998	1	ABC	Witt/Thomas/Harris Productions	
Famous Families	Reality	October 5, 1998	December 13, 1999	2	Fox Family	Glen Avenue Films; Foxstar Productions	
The PJs	Animated sitcom	January 10, 1999	May 20, 2001	3	Fox (Seasons 1–2); The WB (Season 3)	Imagine Television; The Murphy Company; Will Vinton Studios	Moved to Warner Bros. Television after first two seasons
Zoe, Duncan, Jack and Jane	Sitcom	January 17, 1999	June 11, 2000	2	The WB	Michael Jacobs Productions	
Thanks	Sitcom	August 2, 1999	September 2, 1999	1	CBS	Mauretenia Productions	
Once and Again	Drama	September 21, 1999	April 15, 2002	3	ABC	The Bedford Falls Company	
Popular	Dramedy	September 29, 1999	May 18, 2001	2	The WB	Murphy/Matthews Productions; Roundtable Ink; The Shephard/Robin Company	
Brutally Normal	Sitcom	January 24, 2000	February 14, 2000	1	The WB	Swerdlow-Goldberg Productions; The Shephard/Robin Company	
Daddio	Sitcom	March 23, 2000	October 23, 2000	2	NBC	Big Fan Productions	
Wonderland	Drama	March 30, 2000	April 6, 2000	1	ABC	Hostage Productions; Imagine Television	
Clerks: The Animated Series	Animated sitcom	May 31, 2000	June 7, 2000	1	ABC	Miramax Television; View Askew Productions; Woltz International Pictures Corporation; Walt Disney Television Animation (Note: No longer distributed by Buena Vista Television, rights are now owned by Miramax/Paramount Global.)	Based on the 1994 film; four of the six episodes aired on Comedy Central in 2002
Madigan Men	Sitcom	October 6, 2000	December 15, 2000	1	ABC	Chupack Productions; Artists Television Group	
The Trouble with Normal	Sitcom	October 6, 2000	November 3, 2000	1	ABC	Garfield Grove Productions; Paramount Network Television	
The Geena Davis Show	Sitcom	October 10, 2000	July 10, 2001	1	ABC	Wass/Stein Productions	
Gideon's Crossing	Medical drama	October 10, 2000	April 9, 2001	1	ABC	Heel & Toe Films	
The Job	Dramedy	March 14, 2001	April 24, 2002	2	ABC	Apostle; The Cloudland Company; DreamWorks Television	
My Wife and Kids	Sitcom	March 28, 2001	May 17, 2005	5	ABC	Wayans Bros. Entertainment; Impact Zone Productions	
The Beast	Drama	June 13, 2001	July 18, 2001	1	ABC	Imagine Television	
Go Fish	Sitcom	June 19, 2001	July 3, 2001	1	NBC	Wass/Stein Productions	
The Wayne Brady Show	Variety	August 8, 2001	May 21, 2004	3	ABC (Season 1); Syndicated (Seasons 2–3)	Brad Grey Television; Don Mischer Productions	
Alias	Espionage	September 30, 2001	May 22, 2006	5	ABC	Bad Robot	
Bob Patterson	Sitcom	October 2, 2001	October 31, 2001	1	ABC	Angel Ark Productions; 20th Century Fox Television	
Maybe It's Me	Sitcom	October 2, 2001	October 5, 2001	1	May 3, 2002	The WB	SamJen Productions; Warner Bros. Television
Imagine That	Sitcom	January 8, 2002	January 15, 2002	1	NBC	Seth Kurland Productions; Columbia TriStar Television	
Wednesday 9:30 (8:30 Central)	Sitcom	March 27, 2002	June 12, 2002	1	ABC	The Cloudland Company	
Monk	Dramedy	July 12, 2002	December 4, 2009	8	USA	Mandeville Films; Universal Cable Productions	Final series to carry the Touchstone Television logo
8 Simple Rules	Sitcom	September 17, 2002	April 15, 2005	3	ABC	Shady Acres Entertainment; Flody Co. (2002–2004) (seasons 1 & 2); Tracy Gamble Productions (2004) (season 2)	
Life with Bonnie	Sitcom	September 17, 2002	April 9, 2004	2	ABC	Bob & Alice Productions	
Push, Nevada	Drama	September 17, 2002	October 24, 2002	1	ABC	LivePlanet	
MDs	Dramedy	September 25, 2002	December 11, 2002	1	ABC	Marc Platt Productions	
That Was Then	Dramedy	September 27, 2002	October 4, 2002	1	ABC	Brookline Productions; Lemonade Stand Productions	
Less than Perfect	Sitcom	October 1, 2002	June 20, 2006	4	ABC	Wass/Stein Productions	seven unaired episodes were broadcast on Lifetime
Clone High	Animated science fiction-comedy	January 20, 2003	March 10, 2003	1	MTV	Doozer; Lord Miller Productions; Nelvana; MTV	originally aired on Teletoon in Canada; four episodes aired on MTV Classic in 2016
Miracles	Drama	January 27, 2003	March 31, 2003	1	ABC	David Greenwalt Productions; Spyglass Entertainment	
Veritas: The Quest	Drama	January 27, 2003	March 10, 2003	1	ABC	Massett/Zinman Productions; Storyline Entertainment	
Regular Joe	Sitcom	March 28, 2003	April 18, 2003	1	ABC	Fatty McButterpants Productions; Wass-Stein Productions	
Lost at Home	Sitcom	April 1, 2003	April 22, 2003	1	ABC	Michael Jacobs Productions; NBC Studios	
Playmakers	Drama	August 26, 2003	November 11, 2003	1	ESPN	Thanksgiving Day; Imagine Television; Orly Adelson Productions	
Threat Matrix	Drama	September 18, 2003	January 29, 2004	1	ABC	Industry Entertainment	
Hope & Faith	Sitcom	September 26, 2003	May 2, 2006	3	ABC	Industry Entertainment	
10-8: Officers on Duty	Police drama	September 28, 2003	January 25, 2004	1	ABC	Spelling Television; Badlands Entertainment	
It's All Relative	Sitcom	October 1, 2003	April 6, 2004	1	ABC	Storyline Entertainment; Naturally Blond Productions; Paramount Network Television	
Line of Fire	Drama	December 2, 2003	May 30, 2004	1	ABC	Battle Plan Productions; DreamWorks Television	
Kingdom Hospital	Drama	March 3, 2004	July 15, 2004	1	ABC	Sony Pictures Television; Mark Carliner Productions	
Rodney	Sitcom	September 21, 2004	June 6, 2006	2	ABC	Rude Mood Productions; Himmel Films	
Kevin Hill	Drama	September 29, 2004	May 18, 2005	1	UPN	Icon Productions	
Life as We Know It	Drama	October 7, 2004	January 20, 2005	1	ABC	Sachs/Judah Productions; Cabloom! Productions	
Tilt	Drama	January 13, 2005	March 13, 2005	1	ESPN	Koppelmann/Levien; Orly Adelson Productions; Whizbang Films	
Little House on the Prairie	Drama	March 26, 2005	April 23, 2005	1	ABC	Ed Friendly Productions; Voice Pictures	miniseries
Empire	Drama	June 28, 2005	July 26, 2005	1	ABC	Storyline Entertainment	miniseries
Inconceivable	Drama	September 23, 2005	September 30, 2005	1	NBC	Tollin/Robbins Productions	
Commander in Chief	Drama	September 27, 2005	June 14, 2006	1	ABC	Battle Plan Productions; Steven Bochco Productions	
Night Stalker	Drama	September 29, 2005	November 10, 2005	1	ABC	Big Light Productions	Four episodes aired on Sci Fi in 2006
In Justice	Drama	January 1, 2006	March 31, 2006	1	ABC	Spud TV; King Size Productions	
Crumbs	Sitcom	January 12, 2006	February 7, 2006	1	ABC	Marco Pennette Productions; Tollin/Robbins Productions	
Courting Alex	Sitcom	January 23, 2006	March 29, 2006	1	CBS	April Fools Productions; Paramount Network Television	
What About Brian	Dramedy	April 16, 2006	March 26, 2007	2	ABC	Bad Robot; Sachs/Judah Productions (season 1)	
Three Moons Over Milford	Science fiction	August 6, 2006	September 24, 2006	1	ABC Family	Three Moons Film	
Six Degrees	Drama	September 21, 2006	March 30, 2007	1	ABC	Bad Robot; Nosebleed Productions	Last five episodes released on ABC.com
In Case of Emergency	Sitcom	January 3, 2007	April 11, 2007	1	ABC	Bushwacker Productions; Howard J. Morris Productions	
The Knights of Prosperity	Sitcom	January 3, 2007	August 8, 2007	1	ABC	B&B Productions; Worldwide Pants Incorporated	
ABC Studios (2007–2020)
Scrubs	Sitcom	October 2, 2001	March 17, 2010	9	NBC (Seasons 1–7); ABC (Seasons 8–9)	Doozer	Credited as Touchstone Television for first six seasons
According to Jim	Sitcom	October 3, 2001	June 2, 2009	8	ABC	Newman/Stark Production; Suzanne Bukinik Entertainment; Brad Grey Television	Credited as Touchstone Television until 2007
Lost	Science fiction	September 22, 2004	May 23, 2010	6	ABC	Bad Robot	Credited as Touchstone Television until 2007
Desperate Housewives	Dramedy	October 3, 2004	May 13, 2012	8	ABC	Cherry Productions	Credited as Touchstone Television until 2007
Ghost Whisperer	Supernatural drama	September 23, 2005	May 21, 2010	5	CBS	CBS Television Studios; Sander/Moses Productions	Credited as Touchstone Television until 2007
Kyle XY	Science fiction	June 26, 2006	March 16, 2009	3	ABC Family	Kyle XY Productions; BenderSpink Productions; Two Cigarettes; One Match Productions (2006); (season 1)	Credited as Touchstone Television until 2006
Brothers & Sisters	Family drama	September 24, 2006	May 8, 2011	5	ABC	Berlanti Television; After Portsmouth Productions	Credited as Touchstone Television until 2007
Ugly Betty	Dramedy	September 28, 2006	April 14, 2010	4	ABC	Silent H Productions; Ventanarosa; Reveille Productions	Credited as Touchstone Television until 2007
Day Break	Fantasy	November 15, 2006	December 13, 2006	1	ABC	Matthew Gross Entertainment	Credited as Touchstone Television until 2006; last seven episodes were broadcast on TV One in 2008
Dirt	Journalism drama	January 2, 2007	April 13, 2008	2	FX	Coquette Productions; Matthew Carnahan Circus Products; FX Productions	credited as Touchstone Television until 2007
October Road	Drama	March 15, 2007	March 10, 2008	2	ABC	Space Floor TV; Mojo Films; Group M Entertainment (season 1)	credited as Touchstone Television until 2007
Army Wives	Military drama	June 3, 2007	June 9, 2013	7	Lifetime	The Mark Gordon Company	
Cane	Family drama	September 25, 2007	December 18, 2007	1	CBS	Once a Frog Productions; El Sendero Productions; Interscope Television; CBS Paramount Network Television	
Reaper	Supernatural drama	September 25, 2007	May 26, 2009	2	The CW	The Mark Gordon Company; Fazekas & Butters; Dark Baby Productions	
Dirty Sexy Money	Legal drama	September 26, 2007	August 8, 2009	2	ABC	Berlanti Productions	
Private Practice	Medical drama	September 26, 2007	January 22, 2013	6	ABC	Shondaland; The Mark Gordon Company	
Carpoolers	Sitcom	October 2, 2007	March 4, 2008	1	ABC	DreamWorks Television; T.R.O.N.T Productions; 3 Arts Entertainment	
Cavemen	Sitcom	October 2, 2007	November 13, 2007	1	ABC	Double Vision Productions; Television 360	
Samantha Who?	Sitcom	October 15, 2007	July 23, 2009	2	ABC	Donald Todd Productions; Brillstein Entertainment Partners	
Amas de Casa Desesperadas	Dramedy	January 10, 2008	June 19, 2008	1	Univision	Pol-Ka Producciones; Cherry Productions	U.S. Spanish-language adaptation of Desperate Housewives
Eli Stone	Legal drama	January 31, 2008	July 11, 2009	2	ABC	Berlanti Productions	
Raising the Bar	Legal drama	September 1, 2008	December 24, 2009	2	TNT	Steven Bochco Productions	
Samurai Girl	Action	September 5, 2008	September 7, 2008	1	ABC Family	Space Floor TV; Alloy Entertainment	Miniseries
Gary Unmarried	Sitcom	September 24, 2008	March 17, 2010	2	CBS	Ed Yeager Productions (2008–2009) (season 1); Rude Mood Productions (2008–2009) (season 1); CBS Television Studios	
Life on Mars	Science fiction	October 9, 2008	April 1, 2009	1	ABC	20th Century Fox Television, Kudos Film and Television and Space Floor TV	Based on the British series of the same name by Matthew Graham, Tony Jordan and Ashley Pharoah
Legend of the Seeker	Fantasy	November 1, 2008	May 22, 2010	2	Syndicated	Paperboy Productions and Renaissance Pictures	
Castle	Police drama	March 9, 2009	May 16, 2016	8	ABC	Beacon Pictures, The Barry Schindel Company (2009) (season 1); Experimental Pictures (2009–13) (seasons 2–5); Milmar Pictures (2013–2015) (seasons 6–7)	
In the Motherhood	Sitcom	March 26, 2009	June 25, 2009	1	ABC	Pointy Bird Productions; Spud TV; Mindshare Entertainment	
Cupid	Dramedy	March 31, 2009	June 16, 2009	1	ABC	Rob Thomas Productions; Sony Pictures Television	
Ruby & the Rockits	Sitcom	July 21, 2009	September 22, 2009	1	ABC Family	Shaun Cassidy Productions	
Cougar Town	Sitcom	September 23, 2009	March 31, 2015	6	ABC (Seasons 1–3); TBS (Seasons 4–6)	Doozer; Coquette Productions	
FlashForward	Science fiction	September 24, 2009	May 27, 2010	1	ABC	HBO Entertainment; Phantom Four Films	
Happy Town	Crime drama	April 28, 2010	June 16, 2010	1	ABC	Space Floor Television	
Scoundrels	Dramedy	June 20, 2010	August 15, 2010	1	ABC	Long Run Productions	
Detroit 1-8-7	Police drama	September 21, 2010	March 20, 2011	1	ABC	Remainder Men Productions; Mandeville Television	
My Generation	School drama	September 23, 2010	September 30, 2010	1	ABC	26 Keys Productions	
No Ordinary Family	Superhero drama	September 28, 2010	April 5, 2011	1	ABC	Berlanti Television; Oh That Gus!, Inc.	
Off the Map	Medical drama	January 12, 2011	April 6, 2011	1	ABC	Shondaland and Minnesota Logging Company	
Criminal Minds: Suspect Behavior	Crime drama	February 16, 2011	May 25, 2011	1	CBS	The Mark Gordon Company; Bernero Productions; CBS Television Studios	
Body of Proof	Medical drama	March 29, 2011	May 28, 2013	3	ABC	Matthew Gross Entertainment; Arcturus Productions (2011–2013) (seasons 2–3)	
Happy Endings	Sitcom	April 13, 2011	May 3, 2013	3	ABC	Sony Pictures Television; FanFare Productions; Shark vs. Bear Productions (2012–2013); (season 3)	
The Protector	Police drama	June 12, 2011	September 19, 2011	1	Lifetime	Wass/Stein Productions	
State of Georgia	Sitcom	June 29, 2011	August 17, 2011	1	ABC Family	Jennifer Weiner Productions; Kirk J. Rudell Productions	
Ringer	Thriller	September 13, 2011	April 17, 2012	1	The CW	Green Eggs And Pam Productions, Inc. Brillstein Entertainment Partners; CBS Productions; Warner Bros. Television	
Revenge	Thriller	September 21, 2011	May 10, 2015	4	ABC	Page Fright (2011–2013); Temple Hill Entertainment	
Man Up!	Sitcom	October 18, 2011	December 6, 2011	1	ABC	Garfield Grove; Bicycle Path Productions; Tagline Television	
Once Upon a Time	Fantasy	October 23, 2011	May 18, 2018	7	ABC	Kitsis-Horowitz	
The River	Horror	February 7, 2012	March 20, 2012	1	ABC	Haunted Movies; J.A. Green Construction Corp. Amblin Television	
GCB	Dramedy	March 4, 2012	May 6, 2012	1	ABC	Darren Star Productions; Kapital Entertainment	
Missing	Adventure	March 15, 2012	May 17, 2012	1	ABC	Little Engine Productions; Upcountry Productions	
Scandal	Political drama	April 5, 2012	April 19, 2018	7	ABC	Shondaland	
Perception	Crime drama	July 9, 2012	March 17, 2015	3	TNT	Paperboy Productions	
The Neighbors	Sitcom	September 26, 2012	April 11, 2014	2	ABC	17–28 Black, Inc. Kapital Entertainment	
Nashville	Musical drama	October 10, 2012	July 26, 2018	6	ABC (Seasons 1–4); CMT (Seasons 5–6)	Lionsgate Television, Opry Entertainment; Cutler Productions (season 1); Walk & Chew Gum, Inc. Small Wishes Productions (seasons 1–4); The Bedford Falls Company (season 5)	Production company for first five seasons
Malibu Country	Sitcom	November 2, 2012	March 22, 2013	1	ABC	ACME Productions; Blah Blah Blah Productions	
Zero Hour	Adventure	February 14, 2013	August 3, 2013	1	ABC	Clickety-Clack Productions; Di Bonaventura Pictures	
Red Widow	Mob drama	March 3, 2013	May 5, 2013	1	ABC	Endemol	
Galip Derviş	Dramedy	March 21, 2013	December 28, 2014	3	Kanal D	Barakuda Film; Universal Cable Productions	Turkish adaptation of Monk by Andy Breckman
Family Tools	Sitcom	May 1, 2013	July 10, 2013	1	ABC	The Mark Gordon Company; ITV Studios America	
Mistresses	Drama	June 3, 2013	September 6, 2016	4	ABC	Good Talk Productions (seasons 1–2); Bob Sertner Productions; Ecosse Films; Tsiporah Productions (season 3)	
Devious Maids	Drama	June 23, 2013	August 8, 2016	4	Lifetime	Cherry/Wind Productions; Televisa Internacional	US adaptation of the Televisa Mexican TV series, Ellas son la alegría del hogar; Originally ordered and developed at ABC
Agents of S.H.I.E.L.D.	Secret agent drama	September 24, 2013	August 12, 2020	7	ABC	Mutant Enemy Productions; Marvel Television	
Lucky 7	Drama	September 24, 2013	October 1, 2013	1	ABC	Amblin Television; Remainder Men; The Beekeeper's Apprentice	
Trophy Wife	Sitcom	September 24, 2013	May 13, 2014	1	ABC	Quantity Entertainment	
Betrayal	Thriller	September 29, 2013	February 19, 2014	1	ABC	Remainder Men Productions; Scripted World Productions; Omroepvereniging VARA	
Hello Ladies	Sitcom	September 29, 2013	November 17, 2013	1	HBO	Four Eyes Entertainment; Quantity Entertainment	
Once Upon a Time in Wonderland	Fantasy	October 10, 2013	April 3, 2014	1	ABC	Kitsis/Horowitz	
Intelligence	Spy drama	January 7, 2014	March 31, 2014	1	CBS	CBS Television Studios; Michael Seitzman's Pictures; Tripp Vinson Productions; The Barry Schindel Company	
Killer Women	Crime drama	January 7, 2014	February 18, 2014	1	ABC	Electus; LatinWE	
Mixology	Sitcom	February 26, 2014	May 21, 2014	1	ABC	Lucas & Moore; Ryan Seacrest Productions	
Resurrection	Supernatural drama	March 9, 2014	January 25, 2015	2	ABC	Plan B Entertainment; Brillstein Entertainment Partners; FTP Productions	
Red Band Society	Dramedy	September 17, 2014	February 7, 2015	1	Fox	Amblin Television; Filmax	
How to Get Away with Murder	Crime drama	September 25, 2014	May 14, 2020	6	ABC	Shondaland; NoWalk Entertainment	
Manhattan Love Story	Sitcom	September 30, 2014	October 21, 2014	1	ABC	Brillstein Entertainment Partners; Burrow Owl Productions	Last seven episodes were released on Hulu
Galavant	Musical	January 4, 2015	January 31, 2016	2	ABC	Rhode Island Ave. Productions	
Agent Carter	Secret agent drama	January 6, 2015	March 1, 2016	2	ABC	Fazekas & Butters; Marvel Television	
Secrets and Lies	Crime drama	March 1, 2015	December 4, 2016	2	ABC	Avenue K Productions; Hoodlum; Kapital Entertainment	
American Crime	Crime drama	March 5, 2015	April 30, 2017	3	ABC	International Famous Players Radio Pictures Corporation; Stearns Castle Entertainment	
Daredevil	Superhero drama	April 10, 2015	October 19, 2018	3	Netflix	DeKnight Productions (season 1); Goddard Textiles; Marvel Television	Moved to Disney+ on March 16, 2022
The Whispers	Science fiction	June 1, 2015	August 31, 2015	1	ABC	Clickety-Clack Productions; Amblin Television	
The Astronaut Wives Club	Period drama	June 18, 2015	August 20, 2015	1	ABC	Fake Empire; Groundswell Productions	
The Muppets	Sitcom	September 22, 2015	March 1, 2016	1	ABC	Bill Prady Productions; The Muppets Studio	
Quantico	Thriller	September 27, 2015	August 3, 2018	3	ABC	Random Acts Productions; Maniac Productions; The Mark Gordon Company	
Grandfathered	Sitcom	September 29, 2015	May 10, 2016	1	Fox	Rhode Island Ave. Productions; Consolidated Chumworks; 20th Century Fox Television	
Code Black	Medical drama	September 30, 2015	July 18, 2018	3	CBS	Michael Seitzman's Pictures; Maniac Productions (Season 3); Tiny Pyro Productions; CBS Television Studios	
Dr. Ken	Sitcom	October 2, 2015	March 31, 2017	2	ABC	Old Charlie Productions; Davis Entertainment; Sony Pictures Television	
Wicked City	Crime drama	October 27, 2015	November 10, 2015	1	ABC	Mandeville Television	Last five episodes were released on Hulu
Jessica Jones	Superhero drama	November 20, 2015	June 14, 2019	3	Netflix	Tall Girls Productions; Marvel Television	Moved to Disney+ on March 16, 2022
Madoff	Drama	February 3, 2016	February 4, 2016	1	ABC	Lincoln Square Productions	Miniseries
The Real O'Neals	Sitcom	March 2, 2016	March 14, 2017	2	ABC	Windsor & Johnson Productions; Di Bonaventura Pictures	
The Family	Thriller	March 3, 2016	May 15, 2016	1	ABC	Mandeville Films; Minnesota Logging Company	
Of Kings and Prophets	Religious drama	March 8, 2016	March 15, 2016	1	ABC	BoomGen Studios; Philotimo Factory; Jason T. Reed Productions	
Criminal Minds: Beyond Borders	Crime drama	March 16, 2016	May 17, 2017	2	CBS	Erica Messer Productions; The Mark Gordon Company; CBS Television Studios	
The Catch	Thriller	March 24, 2016	May 11, 2017	2	ABC	Shondaland	
Uncle Buck	Sitcom	June 14, 2016	July 5, 2016	1	ABC	Will Packer Productions; Unaccountable Freaks Productions; Universal Television	
Speechless	Sitcom	September 21, 2016	April 12, 2019	3	ABC	Silver & Gold Productions; The Detective Agency; 20th Century Fox Television	
Designated Survivor	Political drama	September 21, 2016	June 7, 2019	3	ABC (Seasons 1–2); Netflix (Season 3)	Genre Films; Bevel Gears (season 3); The Mark Gordon Company	
Notorious	Journalism drama	September 22, 2016	December 8, 2016	1	ABC	Osprey Productions and Sony Pictures Television	
Luke Cage	Superhero drama	September 30, 2016	June 22, 2018	2	Netflix	Marvel Television	Moved to Disney+ on March 16, 2022
Conviction	Legal drama	October 3, 2016	January 29, 2017	1	ABC	Double Fried Productions; The Mark Gordon Company	
When We Rise	Historical drama	February 27, 2017	March 3, 2017	1	ABC	Hungry Jackal Productions; Laurence Mark Productions	Miniseries
Iron Fist	Superhero drama	March 17, 2017	September 7, 2018	2	Netflix	Devilina Productions (season 1); Marvel Television	Moved to Disney+ on March 16, 2022
Imaginary Mary	Sitcom	March 29, 2017	May 30, 2017	1	ABC	David Guarascio Productions; Adam F. Goldberg Productions; Happy Madison Productions; Sony Pictures Television	
Downward Dog	Sitcom	May 17, 2017	June 27, 2017	1	ABC	Mosaic Media Group; Animal Media Group; Legendary Television	
Still Star-Crossed	Period drama	May 29, 2017	July 29, 2017	1	ABC	Shondaland	
The Defenders	Superhero drama	August 18, 2017		1	Netflix	Goddard Textiles; Nine and a Half Fingers, Inc. Marvel Television	Miniseries; Moved to Disney+ on March 16, 2022
Inhumans	Superhero drama	September 29, 2017	November 10, 2017	1	ABC	Devilina Productions; Marvel Television	Financed by IMAX Corporation
Kevin (Probably) Saves the World	Fantasy	October 3, 2017	March 6, 2018	1	ABC	Fazekas & Butters	
The Mayor	Sitcom	October 3, 2017	December 12, 2017	1	ABC	Jeremy Bronson Productions; Fee-Fi-Fo Films; FanFare Productions	
The Punisher	Superhero drama	November 17, 2017	January 18, 2019	2	Netflix	Bohemian Risk Productions; Marvel Television	Moved to Disney+ on March 16, 2022
The Alec Baldwin Show	Talk show	March 4, 2018	December 29, 2018	1	ABC	Greengrass Productions; El Dorado Pictures	originally Sundays with Alec Baldwin
For the People	Legal drama	March 13, 2018	May 16, 2019	2	ABC	Davies Heavy Industries; Shondaland	
Alex, Inc.	Sitcom	March 28, 2018	May 16, 2018	1	ABC	Davis Entertainment; Two Soups Productions; Sony Pictures Television	
The Crossing	Science fiction	April 2, 2018	June 9, 2018	1	ABC	Dworkin/Beattie Productions; Brick Moon Television	
Take Two	Detective drama	June 21, 2018	September 13, 2018	1	ABC	Milmar Pictures; Tandem Communications; StudioCanal	
Single Parents	Sitcom	September 26, 2018	May 13, 2020	2	ABC	Elizabeth Meriwether Pictures; JJ Philbin Productions; 20th Century Fox Television	
The Kids Are Alright	Sitcom	October 16, 2018	May 21, 2019	1	ABC	Mr. Bigshot Fancy-Pants Productions Inc.	
Schooled	Sitcom	January 9, 2019	May 13, 2020	2	ABC	Adam F. Goldberg Productions; Happy Madison Productions; Marc Firek Productions; Doug Robinson Productions; Sony Pictures Television	
The Fix	Legal drama	March 18, 2019	May 20, 2019	1	ABC	Happier in Hollywood; Mandeville Films	
Bless This Mess	Sitcom	April 16, 2019	May 5, 2020	2	ABC	Elizabeth Meriwether Pictures; Lake Bell Prod. 20th Century Fox Television	
Grand Hotel	Serial drama	June 17, 2019	September 9, 2019	1	ABC	UnbeliEVAble Entertainment; BT's Fishing Team	
Reef Break	Crime drama	June 20, 2019	September 13, 2019	1	ABC	Wild Poppy Entertainment	Credited as ABC Studios International; aired on M6 in France
Emergence	Mystery	September 24, 2019	January 28, 2020	1	ABC	Fazekas & Butters	
Stumptown	Detective drama	September 25, 2019	March 25, 2020	1	ABC	Jason Richman Entertainment; The District	
Pick of the Litter	Documentary	December 20, 2019	January 24, 2020	1	Disney+	KTF Films; Submarine Deluxe	Limited series; removed from Disney+ on May 26, 2023
Amazing Stories	Anthology	March 6, 2020	April 3, 2020	1	Apple TV+	Universal Television; Kitsis/Horowitz; Amblin Television	Based on the 1985 TV series of the same name
The Baker and the Beauty	Dramedy	April 13, 2020	June 1, 2020	1	ABC	Dean Georgias Entertainment/2.0; Keshet Studios; Universal Television	
Prop Culture	Documentary	May 1, 2020		1	Disney+	Cinema Relics Productions	Removed from Disney+ on May 26, 2023
ABC Signature Studios (2012–2020)
Benched	Sitcom	October 28, 2014	December 30, 2014	1	USA	The Mark Gordon Company	
Blood & Oil	Drama	September 27, 2015	December 13, 2015	1	ABC	Flame Ventures	
Dead of Summer	Horror	June 28, 2016	August 30, 2016	1	Freeform	Kitsis-Horowitz	
Guerrilla	Period drama	April 16, 2017	May 14, 2017	1	Showtime	Green Door Pictures; International Famous Players Radio Pictures Corporation; Fifty Fathoms; Stearns Castle	Miniseries; aired on Sky Atlantic in the UK
SMILF	Dark comedy	November 5, 2017	March 31, 2019	2	Showtime	Showtime Networks; Supahsmart Productions; Quantity Entertainment; Groundswell Productions	
Runaways	Superhero drama	November 21, 2017	December 13, 2019	3	Hulu	Marvel Television; Fake Empire	Removed from Hulu on May 26, 2023
Cloak & Dagger	Superhero drama	June 7, 2018	May 30, 2019	2	Freeform	Wandering Rocks Productions; Marvel Television	
All About the Washingtons	Sitcom	August 10, 2018		1	Netflix	Simmons Lehman Productions; Amblin Television	
High Fidelity	Dramedy	February 14, 2020		1	Hulu	Midnight Radio; West & Kuczarek	Based on the 2000 film of the same name by Touchstone Pictures
Little Fires Everywhere	Drama	March 18, 2020	April 22, 2020	1	Hulu	Hello Sunshine; Best Day Ever Productions; Simpson Street	Limited series; based on the novel of the same name
Helstrom	Fantasy	October 16, 2020		1	Hulu	Marvel Television	
ABC Signature (2020–2024)
Black-ish	Sitcom	September 24, 2014	April 19, 2022	8	ABC	Khalabo Ink Society; Artists First; Cinema Gypsy Productions	Credited as ABC Studios until 2020.
American Housewife	Sitcom	October 11, 2016	March 31, 2021	5	ABC	Eight Sisters, Inc. Wiener & Schwartz Productions; Kapital Entertainment	Credited as ABC Studios until 2020.
The Good Doctor	Medical drama	September 25, 2017	May 21, 2024	7	ABC	3AD Productions; EnterMedia Content; Shore Z Productions; Sony Pictures Television	Credited as ABC Studios until 2020.
Grown-ish	Sitcom	January 3, 2018	May 22, 2024	6	Freeform	Khalabo Ink Society; Principato-Young Entertainment; Cinema Gypsy Productions	Credited as ABC Signature Studios until 2020.
Harrow	Medical drama	March 9, 2018	April 11, 2021	3	ABC TV – Australia	Hoodlum Entertainment	Credited as ABC Studios International until 2019.
Station 19	Firefighter drama	March 22, 2018	May 30, 2024	7	ABC	Shondaland	Credited as ABC Studios until 2020.
A Million Little Things	Dramedy	September 26, 2018	May 3, 2023	5	ABC	Next Thing You Know Productions; Fee-Fi-Fo Films; Kapital Entertainment	Credited as ABC Studios until 2020.
Mixed-ish	Sitcom	September 24, 2019	May 18, 2021	2	ABC	Khalabo Ink Society; Cinema Gypsy Productions; Artists First	Credited as ABC Studios until 2020.
Dollface	Sitcom	November 15, 2019	February 11, 2022	2	Hulu	LuckyChap Entertainment; Clubhouse Pictures	Credited as ABC Signature Studios until 2020; removed from Hulu on May 26, 2023.
For Life	Legal drama	February 11, 2020	February 24, 2021	2	ABC	Sony Pictures Television; Channel Road Productions; Doug Robinson Productions; G-Unit Films and Television Inc.	Credited as ABC Studios until 2020.
United We Fall	Sitcom	July 15, 2020	August 26, 2020	1	ABC	Julius Sharpe International Petroleum & Writing; Exhibit A Sony Pictures Television	Credited as ABC Studios until 2020.
Woke	Sitcom	September 9, 2020	April 8, 2022	2	Hulu	Cloud Nine Productions; Olive Bridge Entertainment; Sony Pictures Television	Credited as ABC Studios until 2020.
The Wilds	Drama	December 11, 2020	May 5, 2022	2	Amazon Prime Video	Amazon Studios; FanFare Productions; Dylan Clark Productions	
Call Your Mother	Sitcom	January 13, 2021	May 19, 2021	1	ABC	Kari's Logo Here; Sony Pictures Television	
The Gloaming	Supernatural drama	March 21, 2021	May 9, 2021	1	Starz	Sweet Potato Films; 2 Jons	Limited series; originally released on Stan in Australia
The Mighty Ducks: Game Changers	Sports dramedy	March 26, 2021	November 30, 2022	2	Disney+	Goldsmith Yuspa Productions; Brillco; Brillstein Entertainment Partners	Based on The Mighty Ducks by Walt Disney Pictures; removed from Disney+ on May 26, 2023
Home Economics	Sitcom	April 7, 2021	January 18, 2023	3	ABC	Lionsgate Television; Colton & Aboud; The Tannenbaum Company	
Rebel	Drama	April 8, 2021	June 10, 2021	1	ABC	Trip the Light Productions; Davis Entertainment; Sony Pictures Television	
Big Shot	Sports dramedy	April 16, 2021	October 12, 2022	2	Disney+	David E. Kelley Productions; Lorey Stories	Removed from Disney+ on May 26, 2023
Queens	Musical drama	October 19, 2021	February 15, 2022	1	ABC	Windpower Entertainment; How My Hair Look	
Promised Land	Drama	January 24, 2022	March 29, 2022	1	ABC (episodes 1–5); Hulu (episodes 6–10)	Neptune Way; Lit Entertainment; Little Mountain Films	
Everything's Trash	Sitcom	July 13, 2022	September 7, 2022	1	Freeform	Tiny Reparations	
Five Days at Memorial	Drama	August 12, 2022	September 16, 2022	1	Apple TV+	Genre Arts; International Famous Radio Players Pictures Corporation	Miniseries
This Fool	Sitcom	August 12, 2022	July 28, 2023	2	Hulu	Tutu, Get In The Car; Incredible Success! Red Pulley Productions; Antigravico	
The Rookie: Feds	Police drama	September 27, 2022	May 2, 2023	1	ABC	Entertainment One; Perfectman Pictures; Winterworks	Spin-off of The Rookie.
Fleishman Is in Trouble	Dramedy	November 17, 2022	December 29, 2022	1	Hulu	AknerCorp; Timberman/Beverly Productions	Limited series; based on the novel of the same name
National Treasure: Edge of History	Adventure	December 14, 2022	February 8, 2023	1	Disney+	Jerry Bruckheimer Television; Disney Branded Television	Based on National Treasure
The Watchful Eye	Thriller	January 30, 2023	March 27, 2023	1	Freeform	Ryan Seacrest Productions; Why I Believe in Fox	Originally titled The Nanny
Unprisoned	Dramedy	March 10, 2023	July 17, 2024	2	Hulu	Onyx Collective; Anonymous Content; SisterLee Productions; Simpson Street	
Tiny Beautiful Things	Dramedy	April 7, 2023		1	Hulu	Best Day Ever; Hello Sunshine; Jaywalker Pictures	Limited series; based on the book of the same name
Saint X	Psychological drama	April 26, 2023	May 31, 2023	1	Hulu	Anonymous Content; Dogarooski Productions; DreamCrew Entertainment	Limited series; Based on the novel of the same name
A Small Light	Drama	May 1, 2023	May 22, 2023	1	National Geographic	National Geographic Studios; John Street Productions; Midwest Livestock; Keshet Studios	Limited series
The Muppets Mayhem	Musical comedy	May 10, 2023		1	Disney+	Adam F. Goldberg Productions; The Muppets Studio	
Black Cake	Drama	November 1, 2023	December 6, 2023	1	Hulu	Harpo Films; Kapital Entertainment; Two Drifters	Based on the book of the same name
Death and Other Details	Mystery	January 16, 2024	March 5, 2024	1	Hulu	Riding in Circles Productions; Last In First Out Inc. Black Lamb	Originally titled Career Opportunities in Murder and Mayhem
Under the Bridge	True crime drama	April 17, 2024	May 29, 2024	1	Hulu	Best Day Ever Productions	Limited series; based on the book of the same name
How to Die Alone	Sitcom	September 13, 2024	September 27, 2024	1	Hulu	Onyx Collective; Welcome Stranger; Big Hattie Productions	

=== 20th Television Animation ===
Title	Subgenre	First air date	Last air date	Number of Seasons	Network or Platform	Co-production company(s)	Note(s)
The Simpsons	Family comedy	December 17, 1989	Present	38	Fox	Gracie Films	Production company since season 33
King of the Hill	Family comedy	January 12, 1997	Present	15	Fox (Seasons 1-13); Hulu (Seasons 14-)	Deedle-Dee Productions, Judgmental Films, 3 Arts Entertainment, Matthew 6:33 Productions (Seasons 14-) and Bandera Entertainment (Seasons 14-)	Production company since season 14
Family Guy	Family comedy	January 31, 1999	Present	24	Fox	Fuzzy Door Productions	Production company since season 20
Futurama	Science fiction-comedy	March 28, 1999	Present	11	Fox (Seasons 1-4); Comedy Central (Seasons 5-7); Hulu (Seasons 8-)	The Curiosity Company	Production company since season 8; credited as "30th Television Animation"; season 10 also aired on FXX from September 15 to October 13, 2025
American Dad!	Family comedy	February 6, 2005	Present	22	Fox (Seasons 1-11; 22-); TBS (Season 12-21)	Underdog Productions and Fuzzy Door Productions	Production company since season 19
Bob's Burgers	Family comedy	January 9, 2011	Present	16	Fox	Wilo Productions	Production company since season 12
Duncanville	Family comedy	February 16, 2020	June 26, 2022	3	Fox	Paper Kite Productions, Scullys, Universal Television, Fox Entertainment and 3 Arts Entertainment (uncredited)	Production company for season 3; last 6 episodes debuted October 18, 2022 on Hulu; distributed outside of the Americas by NBCUniversal International Distribution
Solar Opposites	Science fiction-comedy	May 8, 2020	October 13, 2025	6	Hulu	Important Science and Justin Roiland's Solo Vanity Card Productions! (Seasons 1-3)	Production company since Christmas special; was still credited as 20th Television in Holiday Special on Disney+ prints outside US, also still credited on screen as "A 20th Television Production" until 2022.
Central Park	Musical comedy	May 29, 2020	November 18, 2022	3	Apple TV+	Wilo Productions, Angry Child Productions and Brillstein Entertainment Partners	Production company for season 3
The Great North	Family comedy	January 3, 2021	September 14, 2025	5	Fox	Double Molyneux Sister Sheux, Wilo Productions and Fox Entertainment	Production company since season 2
Hit-Monkey	Action	November 17, 2021	July 15, 2024	2	Hulu	Speck Gordon Inc. and Floyd County Productions	Took over production from defunct Marvel Television
Koala Man	Superhero comedy	January 9, 2023		1	Hulu	Cusack Creatures, Hermit House, Justin Roiland's Solo Vanity Card Productions! (Season 1), Princess Pictures and Bento Box Entertainment	Based on an episode of Fresh Blood
Praise Petey	Dark comedy	July 21, 2023	August 18, 2023	1	Freeform	Anna Drezen Productions, ShadowMachine and Bandera Entertainment	
Stewie	Science fiction-comedy	2027 or 2028			Fox	Fuzzy Door Productions	Second spin-off of Family Guy after The Cleveland Show
Bad Friends	Friendship comedy				Hulu	Underground and Five All In The Fifth	Based on the podcast of the same name
Deano	Comedy				Hulu	Hooligan Animation and BBC Studios	First released on BBC iPlayer and BBC One in the UK
Ghetto Brilliance	Teen comedy				Hulu	Onyx Collective and 3 Arts Entertainment	
The Hobblepots	Family comedy				ABC	Mortal Media and Rooster Teeth	
How to Be Black	Family comedy				ABC	Cinema Gypsy Productions and ABC Signature	based on the book of the same name
Journey to the Center of the Internet	Science-fiction comedy				Hulu		
Rhona Who Lives by the River	Musical comedy				Disney+	Stoopid Buddy Stoodios (animation), Piece of Pie Productions and Disney Television Animation	
Standing By	Supernatural comedy				Hulu	Not a Real Production Company, Straight on Til Morning Productions and Bento Box Entertainment	
Supashawty Girls, Funkamatic Bangbang	Superhero comedy				Freeform		
Swap Meet	Comedy				Hulu	Mortal Media and Sony Pictures Television	
The Trenches	Action-comedy				FX	Floyd County Productions (animation)	

=== 20th Television (distribution arm) ===
- COPS (1989–2013) (distribution for pre-Spike episodes)
- The Bertice Berry Show (1993–1994)
- The Gordon Elliott Show (1994–1997) (produced by CBS Entertainment Productions)
- Sherman Oaks (1995–1997)
- The Magic Hour (1998) (co-produced by Magic Johnson Entertainment)
- Forgive or Forget (1998–2000) (co-produced by Jonathan Goodson Productions)
- Greed (1999–2000) (co-production with Dick Clark Productions)
- Divorce Court (1999–2019) (transferred to Fox First Run starting in Fall 2019)
- Power of Attorney (2000–2002)
- Texas Justice (2001–2005)
- The Rob Nelson Show (2002–2003)
- Ambush Makeover (2004–2005)
- Judge Alex (2005–2014)
- The Ricki Lake Show (revival of 1993–2004 series, 2012–2013)
- Family Feud (2007–2019) (produced by FremantleMedia)
- The Morning Show with Mike and Juliet (2007–2009)
- Temptation (2007–2008) (produced by FremantleMedia)
- Are You Smarter than a 5th Grader? (2009–2011) (Produced by Mark Burnett Productions and Zoo Productions)
- Don't Forget the Lyrics! (2010–2011) (produced by RDF Media USA)
- Dish Nation (2012–2019) (transferred to Fox First Run starting in Fall 2019)
- Page Six TV (2017–2019) (produced by Endemol Shine North America)
- 25 Words or Less (2018–2019) (transferred to Fox First Run starting in Fall 2019)

=== FX Productions ===
Title	Genre	First aired	Last aired	Number of seasons	Network	Co-production company(s)	Notes
2000s
Rescue Me	Comedy drama	July 21, 2004	September 7, 2011	7	FX	Dreamworks Television and Sony Pictures Television	Took over production from 20th Century Fox Television after first three seasons.
It's Always Sunny in Philadelphia	Sitcom	August 4, 2005	Present	18	FX (Seasons 1–8); FXX (Season 9-present)	3 Arts Entertainment and RCG Productions	Took over production from 20th Century Fox Television after first two seasons
Dirt	Journalism drama	January 2, 2007	April 13, 2008	2	FX	Coquette Productions, Matthew Carnahan Circus Products and ABC Studios	
The Riches	Drama	March 12, 2007	April 29, 2008	2	FX	Maverick Television and Fox Television Studios	
Damages	Legal drama	July 24, 2007	September 12, 2012	5	FX (Seasons 1–3); Audience (Seasons 4–5)	KZK Productions, Sony Pictures Television and Gotham Music Placement	Production company for first 3 seasons only
Sons of Anarchy	Gang drama	September 3, 2008	December 9, 2014	7	FX	The Linson Company, Sutter Ink and Fox 21	
Archer	Animated spy comedy	September 17, 2009	December 17, 2023	14	FX (Seasons 1–7); FXX (Season 8–14)	Floyd County Productions	
The League	Sitcom	October 29, 2009	December 9, 2015	7	FX (Seasons 1-4); FXX (Seasons 5–7)	Chicken Sticks	
2010s
Justified	Crime drama	March 16, 2010	April 14, 2015	6	FX	Rooney McP Productions, Timberman/Beverly Productions, Nemo Films and Sony Pictures Television	
Louie	Sitcom	June 29, 2010	May 28, 2015	5	FX	3 Arts Entertainment and Pig Newton, Inc.	
Lights Out	Drama	January 11, 2011	April 5, 2011	1	FX	Warren Leight Productions, Fineman Entertainment and Fox Television Studios	
Wilfred	Sitcom	June 23, 2011	August 13, 2014	4	FX (Seasons 1-3); FXX (Season 4)	Zook, Inc., Prospect Park, Renegade Australia and SBS Australia	Based on the Australian series of the same name
Unsupervised	Animated sitcom	January 19, 2012	December 20, 2012	1	FX	Floyd County Productions, RCG Productions and The Professional Writing Company	
Brand X with Russell Brand	Talk	June 28, 2012	May 2, 2013	2	FX	Branded Films and Dakota Films	
Totally Biased with W. Kamau Bell	Sketch	August 9, 2012	November 17, 2013	2	FX (Season 1); FXX (Season 2)	CR Enterprises	
Legit	Sitcom	January 17, 2013	May 14, 2014	2	FX (Season 1); FXX (Season 2)	Regular Guy Films and Nugget Productions	
The Americans	Spy drama	January 30, 2013	May 30, 2018	6	FX	Nemo Films, DreamWorks Television (Season 1), Amblin Television (Seasons 2-6) and Fox 21 Television Studios	
The Bridge	Police drama	July 10, 2013	October 1, 2014	2	FX	Shorewood, Inc., Elwood Reid, Inc., Filmlance and Shine America	Based on the Danish series of the same name
Chozen	Animated sitcom	January 13, 2014	March 31, 2014	1	FX	Rough House Pictures and Floyd County Productions	
Fargo	Crime drama	April 15, 2014	Present	5	FX	26 Keys Productions, The Littlefield Company, Mike Zoss Productions (Seasons 1-2), Nomadic Pictures (Seasons 1-3) and MGM Television	Inspired by the 1996 film of the same name
Tyrant	Family drama	June 24, 2014	September 7, 2016	3	FX	Teakwood Lane Productions, Keshet Broadcasting and Fox 21 Television Studios	
The Strain	Horror	July 13, 2014	September 17, 2017	4	FX	Double Dare You and Carlton Cuse Productions	Based on the novel of the same name
Married	Sitcom	July 17, 2014	October 1, 2015	2	FX	Principato-Young Entertainment and Night Eater Productions	
You're the Worst	Sitcom	July 17, 2014	April 3, 2019	5	FX (Season 1); FXX (Seasons 2–5)	Hooptie Entertainment	
Man Seeking Woman	Sitcom	January 14, 2015	March 8, 2017	3	FXX	Broadway Video and Allagash Industries	
The Comedians	Sitcom	April 9, 2015	June 25, 2015	1	FX	Jennilind Productions, Larry Charles Projects, Tamaroa Productions, Flying Glass of Milk Productions, Fabrik Entertainment and Fox 21 Television Studios	
Wayward Pines	Mystery	May 14, 2015	August 8, 2017	2	Fox	Olive Entertainment, Blinding Edge Pictures, De Line Pictures, Storyland and 20th Century Fox Television	Production company for season 1 only. Replaced by 20th Century Fox Television for season 2.
Sex & Drugs & Rock & Roll	Sitcom	July 16, 2015	September 1, 2016	2	FX	Apostle and Fox 21 Television Studios	
The Bastard Executioner	Period drama	September 15, 2015	November 17, 2015	1	FX	Sutter Ink, Imagine Television and Fox 21 Television Studios	
One Mississippi	Sitcom	November 5, 2015	September 8, 2017	2	Amazon Prime Video	Zero Dollars and Zero Sense Productions, Good Egg Productions, Inc., Pig Newton, Inc., 3 Arts Entertainment and Amazon Studios	
Baskets	Sitcom	January 21, 2016	August 22, 2019	4	FX	Billios, 3 Arts Entertainment (Seasons 1-2), Pig Newton, Inc. (Seasons 1-2) and Brillstein Entertainment Partners	
American Crime Story	Crime drama	February 2, 2016	November 9, 2021	3	FX	Scott & Larry Productions, Color Force, Ryan Murphy Television and 20th Television	
Atlanta	Comedy-drama	September 6, 2016	November 10, 2022	4	FX	RBA, 343 Incorporated and MGMT. Entertainment	
Better Things	Sitcom	September 8, 2016	April 25, 2022	5	FX	Slam Book, Inc., 3 Arts Entertainment (Seasons 1-2) and Pig Newton, Inc. (Seasons 1-2)	
Taboo	Drama	January 10, 2017	February 28, 2017	1	FX	Scott Free Productions, Hardy Son & Baker, Sonar Entertainment and BBC	Aired on BBC One in the United Kingdom
Legion	Superhero	February 8, 2017	August 12, 2019	3	FX	26 Keys Productions, The Donners' Company, Bad Hat Harry Productions (Season 1), Kinberg Genre and Marvel Television	
Snowfall	Period drama	July 5, 2017	April 19, 2023	6	FX	Shoe Money Productions, Dave & Ron Productions, New Deal Entertainment, Groundswell Productions and Underground Films	
Trust	Crime drama	March 25, 2018	May 27, 2018	1	FX	Cloud Eight Films, Decibel Films and Snicket Films	
Pose	Period drama	June 3, 2018	June 6, 2021	3	FX	Color Force, Brad Falchuk Teley-Vision, Ryan Murphy Television and 20th Television	
Mayans M.C.	Gang drama	September 4, 2018	July 19, 2023	5	FX	Sutter Ink and 20th Television	Follow-up to Sons of Anarchy
Mr Inbetween	Comedy-drama	September 25, 2018	July 13, 2021	3	FX	Create NSW, Screen Australia, Jungle Entertainment, Blue-Tongue Films and Pariah Productions	Production company for seasons 2-3, Aired on Fox Showcase in Australia
The Cool Kids	Sitcom	September 28, 2018	May 10, 2019	1	Fox	RCG Productions, Enrico Pallazzo, Nest Egg Productions, 3 Arts Entertainment and 20th Century Fox Television	
Miracle Workers	Sitcom	February 12, 2019	August 28, 2023	4	TBS	Broadway Video, Allgash Industries (seasons 1–2), RIP Productions (season 3), Pink Moment Productions (season 3) and Studio T	Second season subtitled "Dark Ages"; Third season subtitled "Oregon Trail"; Fourth season subtitled "End Times"
What We Do in the Shadows	Supernatural comedy	March 27, 2019	December 16, 2024	6	FX	Two Canoes Pictures (Seasons 1–2) and 343 Incorporated	Based on the 2014 film of the same name
Fosse/Verdon	Drama	April 9, 2019	May 28, 2019	1	FX	West Egg Studios, 5000 Broadway Productions, Pyrrhic Victory Productions, Joel Fields Productions, Old 320 Sycamore and Fox 21 Television Studios	Limited series
Perpetual Grace, LTD	Neo-noir thriller	June 2, 2019	August 4, 2019	1	Epix	Escape Artists, Chi-Town Pictures, Elephant Pictures and MGM Television	
Cake	Anthology	September 25, 2019	December 9, 2021	5	FXX	SLAQR	
A Christmas Carol	Drama	December 19, 2019	December 24, 2019	1	FX	Scott Free Productions, Hardy Son & Baker and BBC	Limited series; Aired on BBC One in the United Kingdom
2020s
Breeders	Sitcom	March 2, 2020	September 25, 2023	4	FX	Avalon Television and Sky Original Productions	Aired on Sky One later Sky Comedy in the United Kingdom
Dave	Sitcom	March 4, 2020	May 31, 2023	3	FXX	Dirty Burd, Matthew 6:33, SB Projects, Temple Hill Productions, Hart Beat Productions, Chicken Sticks	
Devs	Mystery	March 5, 2020	April 16, 2020	1	FX on Hulu	DNA TV	Limited series
Mrs. America	Political drama	April 15, 2020	May 27, 2020	1	FX on Hulu	Shiny Penny Productions, Dirty Films, Gowanus Projections and Federal Engineering	Limited series
Dicktown	Animated sitcom	July 9, 2020	March 31, 2022	2	FXX	Floyd County Productions	Spun off from Cake
A Wilderness of Error	Documentary	September 25, 2020	October 2, 2020	1	FX	Truth Media, Rachael Horovitz Productions, Universal Content Productions and Blumhouse Television	Based on the book of the same name
A Teacher	Drama	November 10, 2020	December 29, 2020	1	FX on Hulu	Aggregate Films and Hola Fidel	Limited series; based on the 2013 film of the same name
Black Narcissus	Drama	November 23, 2020		1	FX	DNA TV	Limited series; aired on BBC One in the United Kingdom; based on the novel of the same name
Hip Hop Uncovered	Documentary	February 12, 2021	February 26, 2021	1	FX	Lightbox Entertainment, Five All in the Fifth and The 51	
Hysterical	Documentary	April 2, 2021		1	FX	Campfire and Milestone	TV movie
Pride	Documentary	May 14, 2021	May 21, 2021	1	FX	Vice Studios and Killer Films	
Reservation Dogs	Comedy-drama	August 9, 2021	September 27, 2023	3	FX on Hulu	Piki Films and Film Rites	
Y: The Last Man	Science fiction	September 13, 2021	November 1, 2021	1	FX on Hulu	Future Investigations, Color Force and Witch's Mark Productions	Based on the DC graphic novel series of the same name; removed from Hulu on May 26, 2023
The Premise	Anthology	September 16, 2021	October 7, 2021	1	FX on Hulu	Novak and Le Grisbi Productions	Removed from Hulu on May 26, 2023
Under the Banner of Heaven	Crime drama	April 28, 2022	June 2, 2022	1	FX on Hulu	Hungry Jackal Productions, Aggregate Films and Imagine Television	Limited series; based on the book of the same name
Pistol	Musical drama	May 31, 2022		1	FX on Hulu	Decibel Films, Sir Weighty Tomes, Crescent Moon Media, Jonesy's Jukebox and wiip	Limited series; removed from Hulu on May 26, 2023
The Bear	Comedy-drama	June 23, 2022	June 25, 2026	5	FX on Hulu		
Welcome to Wrexham	Docuseries	August 24, 2022	Present	5	FX	Boardwalk Pictures, 3 Arts Entertainment, Maximum Effort, RCG Productions and DN2 Productions	
Little Demon	Animated horror-comedy	August 25, 2022	October 20, 2022	1	FXX	Harmonious Claptrap, Jersey 2nd Ave, Evil Hag Productions and ShadowMachine	
The Patient	Thriller	August 30, 2022	October 18, 2022	1	FX on Hulu	Joel Fields Productions and Film Flam	Limited series
Kindred	Science fiction-drama	December 13, 2022		1	FX on Hulu	The JS and Protozoa Pictures	Limited series
Class of '09	Drama thriller	May 10, 2023	June 21, 2023	1	FX on Hulu	Color Force	Limited series
The Full Monty	Comedy-drama	June 14, 2023		1	Disney+ (UK); FX on Hulu (US)	Searchlight Television, New Wave Films and Little Island Productions	Limited series; follow-up to 1997 film of the same name
Justified: City Primeval	Crime drama	July 18, 2023	August 29, 2023	1	FX	Sony Pictures Television Studios, MGM Television, Rooney McP Productions, Nemo Films, Timberman/Beverly Productions and Dave & Ron Productions	Limited series; follow-up to Justified
A Murder at the End of the World	Drama thriller	November 14, 2023	December 19, 2023	1	FX on Hulu	Mysterium Valley	Limited series
Shōgun	Period drama	February 27, 2024	Present	1	FX on Hulu	Gate 34 Productions and Michael De Luca Productions	
The Veil	Thriller	April 30, 2024	May 28, 2024	1	FX on Hulu	PatMa Productions and Live & Squalor Pictures	Limited series
Clipped	Sports drama	June 4, 2024	July 2, 2024	1	FX on Hulu	Color Force and Indistinct Chatter	Limited series
English Teacher	Comedy-drama	September 2, 2024	October 16, 2025	2	FX	Brian Jordan Alvarez Productions and 343 Incorporated	
Say Nothing	Historical Drama	November 14, 2024		1	FX on Hulu	Color Force	Limited series
Adults	Comedy	May 28, 2025	Present	2	FX	Cosmic Kid and Good at Bizness Inc.	
Alien: Earth	Science fiction horror	August 12, 2025	Present	2	FX/FX on Hulu	26 Key Productions and Scott Free Productions	Based on Alien
The Lowdown	Drama	September 23, 2025	Present	1	FX	Crazy Eagle Media and Dive	
The Drop: A Snowfall Saga	Crime drama	September 8, 2026	Present	1	FX/FX on Hulu	The 51; Shoe Money Productions; Dave & Ron Productions; Groundswell Productions; Underground Films	Spin-off of Snowfall

=== Fox Corporation ===
Title	Years	Notes
The Late Show	1986–1988	produced by Fox Square Productions
The New Adventures of Beans Baxter	1987	produced by Savage Productions and Fox Square Productions
Totally Hidden Video	1989–1992	co-production with Quantum Media
Haywire	1990–1991	
Loyalty and Betrayal: The Story of the American Mob	1994	mini-series; co-production with Pileggi/Couturie Productions and Quest Productions
Saturday Night Special	1996	
World's Wildest Police Videos	1998–2001	
Greed	1999–2000	co-production with Dick Clark Productions
Temptation Island	2001–2003	produced by Fox World
Love Cruise	2001	co-production with Bunim/Murray Productions
Celebrity Boxing	2002	co-production with Dick Clark Productions
30 Seconds to Fame	2002–2003	co-production with Wild Jams Productions
Joe Millionaire	2003	produced by Fox World
Married by America	2003	
Mr. Personality	2003	
The Great American Celebrity Spelling Bee	2004	co-production with Brad Lachman Productions
The Swan	2004	co-production with FremantleMedia North America and Galan Entertainment
Trading Spouses	2004–2007	
My Big Fat Obnoxious Boss	2004	
The Rebel Billionaire: Branson's Quest for the Best	2004–2005	
Renovate My Family	2004–2005	
Skating with Celebrities	2006	
Unan1mous	2006	co-production with 3Ball Productions
Nashville	2007	co-production with Go Go Luckey Productions
Mobbed	2011–2013	co-production with Alevy Productions and Angel City Factory
The Choice	2012	co-production with A. Smith & Co. Productions and Entertain the Brutes
I Wanna Marry "Harry"	2014	co-production with Zig Zag Productions and Ryan Seacrest Productions
Home Free	2015–2016	co-production with Relativity Television/Critical Content
Party Over Here	2016	produced by 2nd Man on the Moon, The Lonely Island, and Kablamo!
American Grit	2016–2017	co-production with Leftfield Pictures and Hard Nocks South Productions
You the Jury	2017	
Beat Shazam	2017–2019	co-production with Apploff Entertainment, Shazam, and MGM Television
The Four: Battle for Stardom	2018	co-production with ITV Entertainment and Armoza Formats
The Passage	2019	co-production with 20th Century Fox Television, 6th & Idaho, Selfish Mermaid and Scott Free Productions
Proven Innocent	2019	co-production with 20th Century Fox Television, Danny Strong Productions, and Leap Boy Productions
First Responders Live	2019	

==== Fox Television Stations ====
Title	Years	Network	Notes
Romper Room and Friends	1966–1988	WWOR-TV	Certain elements owned by Hasbro Entertainment
Wonderama	1980–1983	WNEW	
Dr. Science	1987	Syndication	
Steampipe Alley	1988–1993	WWOR-TV	
Double Dare	1988–1989	Syndication	co-production for Viacom
The Reporters	1988–1990	FOX	
Over 17 Not Admitted	1988	Syndication	
Finders Keepers	1988–1989	Syndication	season 2 only; co-production for Viacom
Comic Strip Live	1989–1994	FOX	
Comedy Express	1989	Syndication	
COPS	1989–2013	FOX	co-production with (Barbour/)Langley Productions pre-Spike episodes currently distributed by Rocket Rights
Tribes	1990	Syndication	co-production with FSO Productions
Moneywise	1990–1995	WJBK	produced by WJBK
The Mother Love Show	1991	Syndication	
In Person with J. P. McCarthy	1991–1992	WJBK	monthly specials; produced by WJBK
Not Just News	1991–1996	Syndication	
Code 3	1992–1993	Fox	co-production with Barbour/Langley Productions
Time Warped	1995	N/A	co-production with AM/FM Pictures

==== Fox First Run ====
These shows were previously distributed by 20th Television, prior to the Disney-Fox merger. Fox First Run's ad sales are handled by Paramount Global's CBS Media Ventures.

Title	Original run	Network	Notes
Divorce Court	1999–2019	Syndication	produced by Lincolnwood Drive, Inc.
TMZ on TV	2007–2019	Syndication	produced by Fox Alternative Entertainment; syndicated since 2021
TMZ Live	2012–2019	Syndication	produced by Fox Alternative Entertainment; syndicated since 2021
Dish Nation	2012–2019	Syndication	produced by Fox Television Stations
25 Words or Less	2018–2019	Syndication	produced by Dino Bones Productions

== Television films and specials ==
=== 20th Television ===
Note: Formerly known as 20th Century Fox Television.

- The Forest Ranger (1956)
- Operation Cicero (1956)
- Monte Carlo (1961)
- Sally & Sam (1965)
- Batgirl (1968)
- Braddock (1968)
- European Eye (1968)
- The Desperate Mission (1969)
- City Beneath the Sea (1969)
- Anderson and Company (1969)
- The Flim-Flam Man (1969)
- Daughter of the Mind (1969)
- Honeymoon with a Stranger (1969)
- David Copperfield (1969)
- Along Came a Spider (1970)
- The Challenge (1970)
- The Kowboys (1970)
- Southern Fried (1970)
- Three Coins in the Fountain (1970)
- Prudence and the Chief (1970)
- Tribes (1970)
- Paper Man (1971)
- Mr. and Mrs. Bo Jo Jones (1971)
- They Call It Murder (1971)
- Dead Men Tell No Tales (1971)
- The CBS Late Movie (1972, select movies)
- When Michael Calls (1972)
- Fireball Forward (1972)
- Oh, Nurse! (1972)
- Return to Peyton Place (1972–1974)
- The ABC Saturday Superstar Movie (1972–1973)
  - Nanny and the Professor (1972) (co-production with Fred Calvert Productions)
  - Lost in Space (1973) (co-production with Hanna-Barbera Productions)
  - Nanny and the Professor and the Phantom of the Circus (1973) (co-production with Fred Calvert Productions)
- Pursuit (1972)
- Incident on a Dark Street (1973)
- Going Places (1973)
- RX for Defense (1973)
- The Barbara Eden Show (1973)
- Terror on the Beach (1973)
- Ordeal (1973)
- Blood Sport (1973)
- Miracle on 34th Street (1973)
- The Borrowers (1973)
- Mrs. Sundance (1974)
- Fred Astaire Salutes the Fox Musicals (1974)
- If I Love You, Am I Trapped Forever? (1974)
- Remember When (1974)
- Big Rose: Double Trouble (1974)
- A Tree Grows in Brooklyn (1974) (remake of the classic film of the same name)
- The Mark of Zorro (1974)
- The Red Badge of Courage (1974)
- Stowaway to the Moon (1975)
- The Trial of Chaplin Jensen (1975)
- Adventures of the Queen (1975)
- At Long Last Cole (1975)
- A Girl Named Sooner (1975)
- State Fair (1976)
- Dead on Target (1976)
- Time Travelers (1976)
- The Cheerleaders (1976)
- Jeremiah of Jacob's Neck (1976)
- Wanted: The Sundance Woman (1976)
- Sherlock Holmes in New York (1976)
- Life Goes to the Movies (1976)
- Raid on Entebbe (1977)
- A Circle of Children (1977)
- Spectre (1977)
- Good Against Evil (1977)
- James at 15 (1977)
- The Making of Star Wars (1977) (co-production with Lucasfilm, Ltd.)
- Life Goes to War: Hollywood and the Home Front (1977)
- Murder in Peyton Place (1977)
- Tales of the Nunundaga (1977)
- Christmas Miracle in Caufield, U.S.A. (1977)
- Ring of Passion (1978)
- Husbands, Wives & Lovers (1978)
- Mother, Juggs & Speed (August 17, 1978)
- A Guide for the Married Woman (1978)
- The Nativity (1978)
- Star Wars Holiday Special (1978)
- Like Normal People (1979)
- Swan Song (1980)
- The Day Christ Died (1980)
- Jake's Way (1980)
- Tourist (1980)
- The Diary of Anne Frank (1980)
- SP FX: The Empire Strikes Back (1980) (co-production with Lucasfilm, Ltd.)
- Word of Honor (1981)
- Jacqueline Susann's Valley of the Dolls (1981)
- Aliens from Another Planet (1982)
- The Day the Bubble Burst (1982)
- Tomorrow's Child (1982)
- The Rules of Marriage (1982)
- Sister Sister (1982)
- Rooster (1982)
- Kentucky Woman (1983)
- Love Is Forever (1983)
- Blood Feud (1983)
- For Love and Honor (1983)
- Manimal (1983)
- Classic Creatures: Return of the Jedi (1983) (co-production with Lucasfilm, Ltd.)
- From Star Wars to Jedi: The Making of a Saga (1983) (co-production with Lucasfilm, Ltd.)
- Helen Keller: The Miracle Continues (1984)
- W*A*L*T*E*R (1984)
- Love Thy Neighbor (1984)
- Cover Up (1984)
- Sentimental Journey (1984)
- The Sun Also Rises (1984)
- Caravan of Courage: An Ewok Adventure (1984) (co-production with Lucasfilm, Ltd. and Korty Films)
- Half Nelson (1985)
- Peyton Place: The Next Generation (1985)
- Goodbye Charlie (1985)
- Covenant (1985)
- In Like Flynn (1985)
- Murder: By Reason of Insanity (1985)
- A Letter to Three Wives (1985)
- Ewoks: The Battle for Endor (1985) (co-production with Lucasfilm, Ltd.)
- A Masterpiece of Murder (1986)
- Popeye Doyle (1986)
- Memories of M*A*S*H (1991)
- The Omen (1995)
- The Hunt for the Unicorn Killer (1999) (co-production with Dan Wigutow Productions and Regency Television)
- Olive, the Other Reindeer (1999) (co-production with The Curiosity Company)
- The Sight (2000)
- M*A*S*H: 30th Anniversary Reunion (2002)
- Master Spy: The Robert Hanssen Story (2002)
- RFK (2002) (co-production with Artisan Television)
- The Simpsons 20th Anniversary Special – In 3-D! On Ice! (2010)
- Dan the Weatherman (2018) (co-production with Tomorrow Studios)
- A Very Jonas Christmas Movie (2025)
- The Muppet Show (2026) (co-production with The Muppets Studio and Point Grey Pictures)

==== Fox Circle Productions/National Studios ====
- Love and Betrayal: The Mia Farrow Story (1995)
- The O. J. Simpson Story (1995)
- Alien Nation: Millennium (1996)
- If Looks Could Kill (1996)
- Pretty Poison (1996)
- Nick Fury: Agent of S.H.I.E.L.D. (1998)

==== Touchstone Television ====
- Gargantua (1998)
- Night of the Headless Horseman (1999)
- Home Alone 4: Taking Back the House (2002)
- Baywatch: Hawaiian Wedding (2003)
- Return to the Batcave: The Misadventures of Adam and Burt (2003) (co-production with Artisan Entertainment and The Kaufman Company)
- The Muppets' Wizard of Oz (2005) (co-production with The Jim Henson Company and Touchstone Television)
- Romy and Michele: In the Beginning (2005)
- Their Eyes Were Watching God (2005)
- Flight 93 (2006)
- Books of Blood (2020) (co-production with Fuzzy Door Productions, Beetlecod Productions and Seraphin Films); Hulu original film

==== Foxstar Productions ====
- The Fantasy Worlds of Irwin Allen (1995)
- A Hollywood Christmas (1996)
- Twentieth Century Fox: The First 50 Years (1997)
- Hidden Hollywood: Treasures from the 20th Century Fox Film Vaults (1997)
- Behind the Planet of the Apes (1998)
- Beyond Titanic (1998)
- Hollywood Screen Tests (1999)
- Boom!: Hollywood's Greatest Disaster Movies (1999)
- Hidden Hollywood II: More Treasures from the 20th Century Fox Vaults (1999)
- Cleopatra: The Film That Changed Hollywood (2000)
- Hollywood at Your Feet : The Story of the Chinese Theatre Footprints (2000)
- Twentieth Century Fox: The Blockbuster Years (2000)
- The Omen Legacy (2001)
- Marilyn Monroe: The Final Days (2001)
- Hollywood Rocks the Movies: The 1970s (2002)
- The 'Alien' Saga (2002)

==== Metromedia Producers Corporation ====
- She Waits (1972)
- Second Chance (1972)
- Go Ask Alice (1973)
- The Norliss Tapes (1973) (co-production with Dan Curtis Productions)
- Honor Thy Father (1973)
- Class of '63 (1973) (co-production with Stonehenge Productions)
- Scream of the Wolf (1974)
- It's Good to Be Alive (1974) (co-production with Larry Harmon Pictures Corporation)
- Hurricane (1974) (co-production with Montagne Productions)
- Terror on the 40th Floor (1974) (co-production with Montagne Productions)
- Where Have All the People Gone? (co-production with The Jozak Company, Alpine Productions Inc.)
- Punch and Jody (1974) (co-production with Stonehenge Productions)
- Lady of the House (1978)
- Wild Times (1980) (co-production with Rattlesnake Productions, Inc.)
- Roughnecks (1980) (co-production with Rattlesnake Productions, Inc.)
- No Place to Hide (1981)

==== MTM Enterprises ====
- Just an Old Sweet Song (1976)
- Something for Joey (1977)
- Isabella and the Dinosaur Dog (1978)
- First, You Cry (1978)
- Vampire (1979)
- The Boy Who Drank Too Much (1980)
- Thornwell (1981)
- Apollo 11 (1996)
- Night of the Twisters (1996) (co-production with PorchLight Entertainment and Atlantis Films)
- Christmas Every Day (1996)

=== Fox Corporation ===
- 41st Primetime Emmy Awards (1989)
- The Making of America's Best Television: The Creative Arts Emmy Awards (1991)
- Rolling Stone '93: The Year in Review (1993)
- Madonna: Innocence Lost (1994)
- Love Thy Neighbor: The Baddest and The Best of Melrose Place (1995)
- Oops! The World's Funniest Outtakes (1995)
- For Better or for Worse: The World's Funniest Wedding Disasters (1995)
- The Secrets of the X-Files (1995)
- Countdown to the Emmys (1995)
- Springfield's Most Wanted (1995)
- Billboard Music Awards (1995, 2001–2006)
- The 1995 Clio Awards (1995)
- Ho! Ho! Ho! TV's All-Time Funniest Christmas Moments (1995)
- Fox's New Year's Eve Live! (1995, 2010, 2012–2013)
- More Secrets of the X-Files (1996)
- USA vs. The World: The Ultimate Gymnastics Competition (1996)
- Inside The X-Files (1998) (currently owned by The Walt Disney Company)
- Shocking Behavior Caught on Tape (two specials; 1999)
- Opening the Lost Tombs: Live from Egypt (1999)
- Train Wrecks (1999)
- Teen Choice Awards (1999–2019)
- Getting Away with Murder: The JonBenet Ramsey Mystery (2000)
- Powers of the Paranormal: Live on Stage! (2000)
- Unauthorized Brady Bunch: The Final Days (2000)
- After Diff'rent Strokes: When the Laughter Stopped (2000)
- Surprise Wedding (2000)
- Celebrity Daredevils Live (2002)
- The Michael Jackson Interview: The Footage You Were Never Meant to See (2003)
- Billboard's New Year's Eve Live (2009)
- American Country Awards (2010–2013)
- American Country New Year's Eve Live! (2011)
- Fox's 25th Anniversary Special (2012)
- The All-Star Dog Rescue Celebration (2014–2015)
- Rent: Live (2019)

==== Fox Television Stations ====
- The 1987 Clio Awards (1987)
- The 1989 Clio Awards: The Best Television Commercials in the World (1989)
- The 1990 Clio Awards: The Best Television Commercials in the World (1990)
- Firehouse (1992)
- The Last Godfather: The John Gotti Story (1992)
- Who Killed Martin Luther King? (1993)

==== Fox News Group ====
- 1968: The 25th Anniversary (1993)
- The Royals: Dynasty or Disaster (1993)
- Talkin' It Out: Questions and Answers About the Oklahoma City Bombing (1995)
- Sex & Romance: A Test for the '90s (1995)
- Fox News Reporting (2004–2008)
- Showdown with Larry Elder (2008)

== See also ==
- 20th Television Animation
- Sky Vision
- Fox Kids
- Love Productions
- Sky Studios
- Fox Entertainment
- List of programs broadcast by Fox Kids
- Freeform (TV channel)
- Foxtel
- List of programs produced by ABC Signature
- Fox Alternative Entertainment
