= Forward: Stories of Tomorrow =

2020 novel by Mari Mancusi

- Author: Veronica Roth; Blake Crouch; N. K. Jemisin; Amor Towles; Paul G. Tremblay; Andy Weir
- Language: English
- Genre: Science fiction
- Publisher: Amazon Original Stories
- Publication date: 2019
- Publication place: United States
- Media type: Audiobook, e-book

Forward: Stories of Tomorrow is a 2019 collection of science fiction short stories curated by American author Blake Crouch and published by Amazon Original Stories. The collection consists of six stories, each written by a different author, namely: "Ark" written by Veronica Roth, "Summer Frost" by Crouch, "Emergency Skin" by N. K. Jemisin, "You Have Arrived at Your Destination" by Amor Towles, "The Last Conversation" by Paul G. Tremblay, and "Randomize" by Andy Weir.

== Synopsis ==
There are six short stories.

- The first short story is "Ark" as written by Veronica Roth. The story follows Samantha, a young scientist cataloging Earth's flora in the face of the planet's imminent destruction by an incoming asteroid.
- The second story is titled "Summer Frost" and is written by Blake Crouch. It follows Riley, a video game developer who realizes that one of her non-player characters has broken free from her programming.
- The third story is "Emergency Skin" by N. K. Jemisin. "Emergency Skin" is set in a future where humanity has abandoned the Earth following its devastation by climate change. It follows an explorer who is sent back to Earth centuries later.
- "You Have Arrived at Your Destination" by Amor Towles is the fourth story in the Forward collection. The story centers on Sam, a man who begins to question the life he has led as he and his wife consider using a fertility clinic to alter their unborn child.
- The fifth story is "The Last Conversation" by Paul G. Tremblay. The story follows an individual who wakes up in a room with no recollection of who they are; they are guided by the voice of the mysterious Dr. Kuhn who tries to help them regain their lost memories.
- The sixth story, "Randomize" by Andy Weir, is a heist thriller about a futuristic casino that implements a quantum computer to create a foolproof random number generator for its keno game. It follows the themes of keno and random number generation.

== Publication history ==
The collection was released in audiobook and e-book formats. The audio version was published by Brilliance Publishing, with narration by Evan Rachel Wood ("Ark"), Rosa Salazar ("Summer Frost"), Jason Isaacs ("Emergency Skin"), David Harbour ("You Have Arrived at Your Destination"), Steven Strait ("The Last Conversation"), and Janina Gavankar ("Randomize").

== Awards and nominations ==
"Emergency Skin" won the 2020 Hugo Award for Best Novelette. The audiobook collection was nominated for the 2020 Audie Award for Short Stories or Collections.
