= The Ones Who Walk Away from Omelas =

1973 short story by Ursula K. Le Guin

- Short story by Ursula K. Le Guin
- Creative Education edition, 1993
- Country: United States
- Language: English

Publication
- Published in: New Dimensions 3
- Publication type: Anthology
- Media type: Print
- Publication date: 1973

"The Ones Who Walk Away from Omelas" (/ˈoʊməˌlɑːs/ OH-mə-LAHSS) is a 1973 short work of philosophical fiction by American writer Ursula K. Le Guin. With deliberately both vague and vivid descriptions, the narrator depicts a summer festival in the utopian city of Omelas, whose prosperity depends on the perpetual misery of a single child. "The Ones Who Walk Away from Omelas" was nominated for the Locus Award for Best Short Fiction in 1974 and won the Hugo Award for Best Short Story in 1974.

== Plot ==
The only chronological element of the work is that it begins by describing the first day of summer in Omelas, a shimmering city of unbelievable happiness and delight. In Omelas, the summer solstice is celebrated with a glorious festival and a race featuring young people on horseback. The vibrant festival atmosphere, however, seems to be an everyday characteristic of the blissful community, whose citizens, though limited in their technology and resources, are still intelligent, sophisticated, and cultured. Omelas has no kings, soldiers, priests, or slaves. The specific socio-politico-economic setup of the community is not mentioned; the narrator merely claims not to be sure of every particular.

The narrator reflects: "Omelas sounds in my words like a city in a fairy tale, long ago and far away, once upon a time. Perhaps it would be best if you imagined it as your own fancy bids, assuming it will rise to the occasion, for certainly I cannot suit you all." Everything about Omelas is so abundantly pleasing that the narrator decides the reader is not truly convinced of its existence and so elaborates upon the final element of the city: its one atrocity. The city's constant state of serenity and splendor requires that a single unfortunate child be kept in perpetual filth, darkness, and misery.

Once citizens are old enough to know the truth, most, though initially shocked and disgusted, ultimately acquiesce to this one injustice that secures the happiness of the rest of the city. However, some citizens, young and old, walk away from the city after seeing the child. Each is alone, and no one knows where they go, but none come back. The story ends by stating: "The place they go towards is a place even less imaginable to most of us than the city of happiness. I cannot describe it at all. It is possible it does not exist. But they seem to know where they are going, the ones who walk away from Omelas."

== Inspiration and themes ==
Le Guin's short story explores the ideas of utilitarianism. Le Guin stated that the city's name is pronounced "OH-meh-lahss". Le Guin chose the name after seeing a road sign for Salem, Oregon, in a car mirror. "[People ask me] 'Where do you get your ideas from, Ms. Le Guin?' From forgetting Dostoyevsky and reading road signs backwards, naturally. Where else?"

The central idea of the scapegoat was posed by author Fyodor Dostoyevsky in The Brothers Karamazov in 1880. Le Guin gave credit to William James, who mentioned the idea in 1891, and she later wrote: "The fact is, I haven't been able to re-read Dostoyevsky, much as I loved him, since I was twenty-five, and I'd simply forgotten he used the idea."

The original Dostoyevsky quote appears in The Brothers Karamazov:

I challenge you: let’s assume that you were called upon to build the edifice of human destiny so that men would finally be happy and would find peace and tranquility. If you knew that, in order to attain this, you would have to torture just one single creature, let’s say the little girl who beat her chest so desperately in the outhouse, and that on her unavenged tears you could build that edifice, would you agree to do it?

The quote by William James in "The Moral Philosopher and the Moral Life", an 1891 essay:

Or if the hypothesis were offered us of a world in which Messrs. Fourier's and Bellamy's and Morris's utopias should all be outdone, and millions kept permanently happy on the one simple condition that a certain lost soul on the far-off edge of things should lead a life of lonely torture, what except a sceptical and independent sort of emotion can it be which would make us immediately feel, even though an impulse arose within us to clutch at the happiness so offered, how hideous a thing would be its enjoyment when deliberately accepted as the fruit of such a bargain?

== Publication history ==
Le Guin's piece was originally published in New Dimensions 3, a hardcover science fiction anthology edited by Robert Silverberg, in October 1973. It was reprinted in Le Guin's The Wind's Twelve Quarters in 1975, and has been frequently anthologized elsewhere. It has also appeared as an independently published, 31-page hardcover book for young adults in 1993.

It was republished in the second volume of the short-story anthology The Unreal and the Real in 2012. Le Guin noted in that collection that "The Ones Who Walk Away from Omelas" "has a long and happy career of being used by teachers to upset students and make them argue fiercely about morality."

=== Translations ===
- Spanish: Quienes se marchan de Omelas. Translated by Maite Fernández. Madrid: Nórdica Libros. 2022. ISBN 8418930594.
- German: Die Omelas den Rücken kehren. Translated by Margot Kempf. München: Heyne. 1980. ISBN 978-3453304987.

== Cultural legacy ==
"The Ones Who Walk Away from Omelas" has inspired a variety of follow-up works and cultural references.

Ricardo Bare and Harvey Smith, designers of the Dishonored video game series, drew on the story as inspiration for The Outsider, an omnipotent immortal being who is reviled as an avatar of evil.

Artist Andrew DeGraff illustrated a map visualizing Le Guin's story in the 2015 book Plotted: A Literary Atlas.

The 2017 music video for "Spring Day" by South Korean band BTS references Le Guin's short story thematically. It also shows a hotel named 'Omelas'.

N. K. Jemisin's 2018 collection How Long 'til Black Future Month? opens with a piece titled "The Ones Who Stay and Fight", which is a direct response to Le Guin's story. In an interview with The Paris Review, Jemisin stated that many readers misunderstand Le Guin as arguing that the only way to create a better society is to leave, and that in fact Le Guin was arguing that one has to "fix" the current society, "especially when there's nowhere to walk away to." Jemisin's 2022 novel The World We Make alludes to the story as well, using the descriptor "Omelasian" in reference to children held captive in a basement.

Joe George argued that the 2019 film Us was influenced by both Le Guin's short story as well as Octavia E. Butler's "Speech Sounds". The Scholomance Trilogy builds a world based on Le Guin's short story.

The short story also inspired a plot line in the third season of Star Trek: Discovery, with the producers noting their interest in a central dilemma solely caused by a child. Reviewers noted similarities between "Lift Us Where Suffering Cannot Reach", an episode of Star Trek: Strange New Worlds and the short story – reviewer Anthony Pascale called the episode "almost a beat-for-beat recreation". Le Guin has had a long influence on the Star Trek franchise and the writers of Star Trek: Discovery named a ship after her.

Isabel J. Kim's short story "Why Don't We Just Kill the Kid In the Omelas Hole", published in Clarkesworld Magazine in February 2024, is set after the events of Le Guin's story. It discusses a third option besides staying in Omelas or walking away: killing the suffering child (an act described by one of the murderers as a form of accelerationism).

== See also ==
- Negative utilitarianism
- Very repugnant conclusion

== Sources ==
- Bloom, Harold, ed. (1986). Ursula K. Le Guin (1st ed.). New York, NY: Chelsea House. ISBN 0-87754-659-2.
- Cadden, Mike (2005). Ursula K. Le Guin Beyond Genre: Fiction for Children and Adults (1st ed.). New York, NY: Routledge. ISBN 0-415-99527-2.
- Le Guin, Ursula (1975). The Wind's Twelve Quarters (1st ed.). New York, NY: Harper & Row. ISBN 0-06-012562-4.
- Spivack, Charlotte (1984). Ursula K. Le Guin (1st ed.). Boston, MA: Twayne Publishers. ISBN 0-8057-7393-2.
