= Pathfinder Ryder =

Player character in Mass Effect: Andromeda

Pathfinder Ryder Scott Ryder / Sara Ryder
- Mass Effect character
- The default male (left) and default female (right) Ryder as presented in Mass Effect: Andromeda.
- First appearance: Mass Effect: Andromeda (2017)
- Voiced by: Tom Taylorson (male); Fryda Wolff (female)

In-universe information
- Occupation: Pathfinder
- Affiliation: Andromeda Initiative

Pathfinder Ryder, default name either Scott Ryder or Sara Ryder, is the player character in BioWare's Mass Effect: Andromeda. Ryder is a fully customizable character whose appearance, gender, and name can be altered by the player at the beginning of the game.

Within the story, they are a member of the Andromeda Initiative, an organization that fled the Milky Way to escape an ongoing war, and inherit the title of Pathfinder from their father Alec Ryder, tasking them with the exploration and colonization of new worlds in the Andromeda Galaxy. Throughout the story Ryder is tasked with exploring the Andromeda galaxy while trying to fend off the Kett, a mysterious hostile race native to Andromeda. Scott Ryder is voiced by Tom Taylorson, while Sara Ryder is voiced by Fryda Wolff. The character was designed to feel like an outsider navigating an unfamiliar world, with BioWare emphasizing personal growth over established heroism.

Pathfinder Ryder was the subject of a facial animation controversy, particularly regarding Sara, which drew criticism from multiple outlets both before and after the game's launch and ultimately prompted BioWare to issue a corrective patch. As a character, Ryder received mixed reviews upon the release of Mass Effect: Andromeda, with critics divided over their personality and characterization when compared to the series' original protagonist Commander Shepard. Ryder has since been the subject of academic analysis examining their role through colonialist, gender, and narrative frameworks.

== Character overview ==
At the beginning of the game, the player has the ability to fully customize Ryder's appearance, gender, and name, which by default is that of Sara or Scott. This character creator offers a set of preset characters as starting templates, though the default Ryder appearance as seen in promotional material cannot be selected or edited directly. Within the game, Ryder is the main playable character; the gender not selected by the player serves as their twin sibling and a character within the story.

The narrative begins with the Ryders as ordinary members of the Andromeda Initiative, an organization founded with the goal of fleeing to the Andromeda Galaxy to escape the Reaper War, an ongoing conflict being waged in the Milky Way between all spacefaring civilizations and a massive fleet of sentient starships known as the Reapers. To achieve this, the initiative sent four massive starships known as "arks" to travel the distance between both galaxies with thousands of members of each species in cryostasis. Each ark had a Pathfinder, an individual who was in charge of the exploration and colonization of "golden worlds", a set of presumably habitable worlds within the fictional Heleus Cluster of the Andromeda Galaxy. Aboard the human ark, this role fell to Alec Ryder, an experienced military officer and the father of Scott and Sara.

At the beginning of the game, the role of Pathfinder is passed down from Alec to whichever sibling the player chooses, while the other remains in cryostasis. During the transfer, Alec's artificial intelligence assistant, the Simulated Adaptive Matrix, better known as SAM, is neurologically linked to Ryder via a neural implant, granting them enhanced situational awareness, problem-solving capabilities, and tactical enhancements. From that point on, Ryder, and by extension, the player, takes on the responsibility of exploring each of the golden worlds which prove to be less habitable than the Initiative had anticipated, with SAM serving as guide and assistant throughout the journey. This neural connection with SAM also grants Ryder the ability to interact with the "remnant" technology left behind by the Jardaan, an ancient species native to Andromeda, which allows them to terraform these planets back to a habitable state.

== Concept and design ==
=== Visual design ===
One of the final designs of the Pathfinder armor, initially worn by Alec Ryder.

The Pathfinder's design went through several iterations. The art team wanted the Pathfinder to feel more like an explorer than a soldier, to contrast with Shepard, the original protagonist of the Mass Effect trilogy. Early concepts reflected this by exploring more tactile elements and integrating technology directly into the suit, such as a melee weapon on the right arm and scanning and information devices on the left. As development progressed, the team decided to give the Pathfinder an underarmor similar to the base suit from the original Mass Effect, opting to keep the armor free of excessive detail to preserve the franchise's established visual style. The art team played with the idea of giving visible upgrades and a cape to the armor, but both concepts were ultimately discarded. The final design instead features its armor and an asymmetrical backpack closely tied to the underarmor. Its helmet incorporates a glass dome intended to evoke explorer utility, while also keeping the character's emotions visible during moments that require them to wear it. The standard Andromeda Initiative armor was then derived from the Pathfinder design, refined into something sleeker and cleaner. The art team also designed several other armor sets available to the player.

=== Narrative design and voice acting ===
Mass Effect: Andromeda's creative director Mac Walters described Ryder's conception as rooted in the idea of a "stranger in a strange land", a concept meant to reflect someone entirely unfamiliar in a new galaxy. This concept was designed to be an integral part of the game's story. Walters also described how, unlike Commander Shepard, who was already an established hero when players first met them, Ryder was deliberately designed as someone who had not yet achieved that status. To accomplish this, the narrative team placed a greater emphasis on how the character feels and deals with their circumstances throughout the story. In an interview with IGN, Walters described Ryder's story as a more intimate variation of the hero's journey, in which Ryder learns and grows over the course of the game, starting from a darker place and progressing toward a hopeful future. BioWare also moved away from the idea of a singular, fixed protagonist. They instead decided to frame Ryder as a role the player inhabits rather than a defined character, a deliberate departure from the approach taken with Shepard in the original trilogy. The team also decided to make both Ryder genders present in the game, regardless of the gender picked by the player.

The narrative team also replaced the Paragon/Renegade system, the morality system utilized by Commander Shepard in the original trilogy, with a dialogue system based on four distinct tones: emotional, logical, casual, and professional, each denoted with a specific icon. Walters stated that the previous system had been too closely tied to the character of Shepard to function effectively with a new protagonist, and criticized its binary nature, noting that most players would simply commit to one path for the entirety of the game. Lead designer Ian Frazier elaborated that the new system grants the player the freedom to adopt any tone at any point in the game, irrespective of prior dialogue choices. Frazier noted the decision to abandon dialogue skills as utilized in other western role-playing games in favor of more situational dialogue reactions, in which characters respond based on specific choices and relationships formed throughout the game rather than an accumulated morality score.

For the voice acting of the character, BioWare cast Fryda Wolff as Sara Ryder and Tom Taylorson as Scott Ryder. In an interview with fansite We are Mass Effect, Tom Taylorson described his work as Scott Ryder in Mass Effect: Andromeda as one of the best experiences of his career as a voice actor, describing the process as "special and challenging". Taylorson further expressed sadness at the possibility of never being able to play Ryder again after the game's troubled release.

== Appearances ==
=== Mass Effect: Andromeda ===
The events of Mass Effect: Andromeda take place roughly 600 years after those of the original Mass Effect. The selected Ryder awakens aboard the human ark, the Hyperion, and joins a small team led by their father to scout humanity's assumed first home planet. Upon arrival, the team discovers the planet, which was being besieged by a mysterius hostile alien race known as the Kett, is no longer capable of supporting human life. Following the activation of the terraforming technology of the planet, Alec Ryder sacrifices his life to save Ryder, who inherits the role of Pathfinder.

After leaving the planet, Pathfinder Ryder leads the Hyperion to the Nexus, an intergalactic space station that had also been sent to Andromeda alongside the four arks, only to realize that it had been badly damaged by an intergalactic space-storm known as the Scourge and that none of the other three arks had yet arrived. Ryder is then tasked with restoring power to the Nexus and exploring the Heleus Cluster's various "golden worlds" aboard the exploration vessel Tempest while joined by a rotating cast of squadmates. After numerous confrontations with the Kett and their leader, Ryder uncovers the location of Meridian, a massive Jardaan-built megastructure that serves as the hub of the vault network responsible for rendering planets habitable. The Kett subsequently launch an assault on the Hyperion, prompting Ryder to lead an attack toward Meridian with the allies gathered throughout their efforts to locate the missing arks and terraform the golden worlds. The game concludes with Ryder defeating the Kett's leader and activating Meridian, setting the restoration of the Heleus Cluster in motion. During a small section of this final mission, the player gets to control the Ryder twin that had not been selected, who still sat aboard the Hyperion.

During an optional sidequest the player can complete to learn about Alec Ryder's memories, it is revealed that Ellen Ryder, Pathfinder Ryder's mother and a key figure in the development of SAM, had been secretly placed aboard the ark Hyperion under the false identity of Elizabeth Reily by Alec Ryder, having fallen gravely ill from a terminal neurological disease caused by her research.

== Reception and analysis ==
=== Facial animation controversy ===
Pathfinder Ryder was among the aspects of Mass Effect: Andromeda subject to technical criticism, particularly regarding facial animations. Prior to the game's release, a gameplay trailer featuring Ryder drew criticism over the quality of Sara's facial animations specifically. Andy Chalk of PC Gamer described them as "not-quite-perfectly animated," while Tom Phillips of Eurogamer remarked that they made her look as though she was "stifling a sneeze". This pre-release controversy prompted former BioWare studio manager Aaryn Flynn to issue a public apology, in which he promised to address the issues. Merely days before launch, Madeline Ricchiuto of Bleeding Cool renewed criticism of Sara's facial animations, highlighting her "uncanny and wooden expressions" as well as her "wandering eyes". The problems persisted after release, leading members of the modding community to attempt their own improvements to Sara's facial structure. While being positive about Scott, Paul Tassi of Forbes criticized Sara's facial structure and animations, stating that it made her look "uncomfortable" when talking, leading him to the conclusion that "Sara is not the ideal face for this game". This controversy ultimately prompted BioWare to issue a patch overhauling the quality of Sara's facial structure and the game's character animations, among other issues.

=== Reception ===
In their preview article of an early access section of Mass Effect: Andromeda, Matt Eliott and Lucas Sull discussed Scott and Sara Ryder separately. Sull regarded Sara's style and voice acting positively, while Eliott put an emphasis on Scott's humor and levity in contrast to Commander Shepard's. Following the release of the game, various writers also viewed Ryder positively, with praise going for their voice acting and personality. Dan Stapleton, writing for IGN, noted Ryder as a likable and well-acted character who could carry the story forward and viewed the fact that the non-selected gender variant became a character in the story positively. Andrea Kasparian of RPG Site regarded Sara Ryder specifically mostly positively, describing her as a personable but awkward character, yet criticizing instances where dialogue choices led to unintended responses from the character.

Other writers discussed Ryder's personality in a more negative way, with criticism going for the lack of control that the player had on it and its humorous undertones. In a review published by Shacknews, Brittany Vincent noted an apparent lack of respect from Initiative members towards Ryder and an absence of player choice regarding their personality, calling them "frustratingly bland" and denouncing the fact that the player could not make Ryder "less awkward and automaton-like". Andy Hartup of GamesRadar+ assessed the character's humorous tendencies early in the game negatively, describing Ryder as an already fully-formed character rather than one shaped by the player, in contrast to Commander Shepard in the original Mass Effect trilogy. Hartup further commented that Ryder's responses to dialogue did not always flow naturally. Edwin Evans-Thirlwell, writing for Eurogamer, criticized the simplicity of the new personality system, stating that it reduced the character to four very basic personalities that did not seem interesting to know.

Ryder's role as the protagonist of the game, when compared to Commander Shepard's, has also been the subject of mixed coverage. Kenneth Shepard, writing for CGMagazine, commented that, even if Ryder's storyline was on a smaller scale than Commander Shepard's, they were put in a more explicit position of responsibility, making them feel more responsible for the lives of the people of the Andromeda Initiative, as their population was smaller. Shepard also maintained that Ryder's goals were different from the Commander's, characterizing them as someone looking to shape the future "for more than just himself". Jade King of TheGamer argued that, because Ryder did not have a military background, they were a more relatable character than Shepard, acting in ways more consistent to how an ordinary person would. King further elaborated how the Pathfinder position was not supposed to be Ryder's, stating that the character's sudden escalation in responsibility following the death of their father made them a "fascinating" character. Matt Goldberg of Collider stated that Mass Effect: Andromeda's issues fell mostly on Ryder, asserting that their ability in stopping the Kett fell strictly on a coincidental connection with SAM. Goldberg felt he was playing the wrong character, with Ryder overshadowing the other Pathfinders and members of the Angara species.

=== Analysis ===
Scholars have discussed Pathfinder Ryder's position in the Andromeda Initiative through the lens of imperialism and colonialism. Tomas Z. Majkowski and Magdalena Kozyra noted Ryder's resemblance to Allan Quatermain in King Solomon's Mines. They drew comparisons between Ryder's access to Jardaan technology while excluding Angara and the attitude expressed in Victorian narrative works, which pretended to present the British Empire as "a rightful ruler" over many non-Western civilizations. René Reinhold Schallegger stated that the Ryder twins represented a "problematic (lack of) understanding of colonialism", as they were from a "white, highly educated, upper middle-class family".

Other scholars explored Ryder through gender and sociological frameworks, with attention focused on Sara's underrepresentation in both the game and its promotional material. René Schallegger criticized how, by leaving Sara Ryder sidelined by default unless the player deliberatelely chose to play as her, Andromeda reinforces a "damsel-in-distress" plot. Leandro Augusto Borges Lima examined BioWare's promotion strategy for Mass Effect: Andromeda through the lens of Steve Woolgar's configuration concept, maintaining that, while Sara and Scott Ryder received more equal representation than male and female Commander Shepard, Scott was still featured more prominently in marketing.

Pathfinder Ryder's role in the game's narrative has also warranted scholarly attention. Vlad Melnic analyzed Ryder and their relationship with SAM within the context of Joseph Campbell's monomyth and the works of philologist David Leeming, contending that their mentorship with SAM morphs the journey motif into a post-humanist myth. Stephanie Farnsworth argued that by allowing the player to modify Ryder's appearance at any moment, something that was not possible in the original Mass Effect trilogy, Ryder can become a mutant. Farnsworth proposed that this creates a narrative inconsistency because biotechnology in Andromeda is supposed to be more limited than in the Milky Way.
