= How Long 'til Black Future Month? =

2018 short-story collection by N. K. Jemisin

- Author: N. K. Jemisin
- Genre: Science fiction, fantasy
- Publisher: Orbit Books
- Publication date: November 2018
- Media type: Print, ebook, audiobook
- Pages: 432
- ISBN: 978-0-316-49134-1
- OCLC: 1061287995

How Long 'til Black Future Month? is a collection of science fiction and fantasy short stories by American novelist N. K. Jemisin. The book was published in November 2018 by Orbit Books, an imprint of the Hachette Book Group. The name of the collection comes from an Afrofuturism essay (not included in the book) that Jemisin wrote in 2013. Four of the 22 stories included in the book had not been previously published; the others, written between 2004 and 2017, had been originally published in speculative fiction magazines and other short story collections. The settings for three of the stories were developed into full-length novels after their original publication: The Killing Moon, The Fifth Season, and The City We Became.

== Background ==
At the time of publication in 2018, the 46-year-old author, N. K. Jemisin, had just won that year's Hugo, Nebula and Locus awards for her latest novel The Stone Sky, the third novel in her Broken Earth series. While Jemisin had become better known as a novelist since her 2010 debut novel The Hundred Thousand Kingdoms, she had short stories published since 2004 and had "Non-Zero Probabilities" nominated for the 2010 Hugo Award and Nebula Award for Best Short Story. Since then, she worked on short stories only between her work on novels.

Being active in the American science fiction and fantasy writing community and having experienced the industry as an African-American fan and aspiring writer, Jemisin advocated more representation for minorities in literature and being critical of portraying harmful stereotypes. She stated that she believed the publishing industry was stagnating by producing predominately self-reassuring "comfort fiction" for its core audience. To this end, she wrote an essay in 2013 titled "How Long 'Til Black Future Month? The Toxins of Speculative Fiction, and the Antidote that is Janelle Monáe" and edited the 2018 edition of the short-story anthology series The Best American Science Fiction and Fantasy, purposefully selecting stories that she found revolutionary, innovative, or provided alternative perspectives. While the essay was not included in the book How Long 'Til Black Future Month?, many of its points were included in the book's introduction section. In line with the essay, and as Jemisin explained in the book's introduction, the short story format allowed her to write many of the protagonists as persons of color, which she otherwise finds makes full-length novels less likely to be published or read.

== Style and themes ==
With the title itself invoking afrofuturism, the stories include a range of sub-genres of speculative fiction. For example, representative stories and sub-genres include "The Effluent Engine" as an alternate history steampunk story set in 19th century New Orleans, "Cloud Dragon Skies" as climate fiction, "Too Many Yesterdays, Not Enough Tomorrows" as a time travel story, "The Storyteller's Replacement" sword and sorcery, "On the Banks of the River Lex" post-apocalyptic fiction, and "The Trojan Girl" cyberpunk. Referencing older fiction, Jemisin includes a pastiche of Ursula K. Le Guin's "The Ones Who Walk Away from Omelas" with "The Ones Who Stay and Fight" and an alternative take on Robert A. Heinlein's The Puppet Masters with "Walking Awake". Three of the short stories, described by Jemisin as "proof-of-concept" stories, would later be used as a basis for future novels: "The Narcomancer" for The Killing Moon, "Stone Hunger" for The Fifth Season, and "The City Born Great" for The City We Became. Based on these approaches, science fiction editor Gary K. Wolfe describes Jemisin as "someone who enjoys playing with the possibilities of the plotted tale".

While the stories in the collection cover a range of topics and themes, reviewers noted many of the stories portray protagonists that are not members of the story's dominant society and are written to display compassion. Many of the stories illustrate the power dynamics of those societies and see characters seeking an escape or otherwise asserting themselves. As the reviewer in the Los Angeles Times states, "As in most of the stories here, the protagonist of "Stone Hunger" refuses to accept the sectarian role dictated by those who rule, or seem to rule, the broken world she inhabits."

== Synopsis and format ==
The book is a collection of 22 short stories with an introductory section all written by Jemisin. All but four of the stories were previously published between 2004 and 2017. The stories are:

Title	Year originally published	Synopsis
"The Ones Who Stay and Fight"	2018	The narrator contrasts the near-utopia of Um-Helat with Omelas and America.
"The City Born Great"	2016	A homeless person is taught by his friend Paulo to become New York City. Later developed into The City We Became (2020).
"Red Dirt Witch"	2016	A practitioner of magic in Alabama confronts a fairy woman who seeks to take one of her children.
"L'Alchimista"	2004	A chef is challenged by a stranger to prepare a recipe he provides.
"The Effluent Engine"	2011	A Haitian spy in New Orleans seeks to recruit an engineer to invent an airship engine powered by effluent from sugar distillation.
"Cloud Dragon Skies"	2005	A girl interacts with a scientist from people who live in the sky as they seek to correct effects accidentally made to the atmosphere.
"The Trojan Girl"	2011	Beings of artificial intelligence in a simulated world seek to incorporate the computer code of a new being.
"Valedictorian"	2012	A graduate must decide whether she will allow herself to be taken away by transhumans who remove the most intelligent people from her society.
"The Storyteller's Replacement"	2018	The narrator tells the story of a king who hunted dragons believing that eating their heart would allow him to sire a son.
"The Brides of Heaven"	2007	A woman tampers with the water treatment system on a planetary colony where only the women have survived.
"The Evaluators"	2016	By reading through communication logs, the fate of a first contact team on an alien world is assessed.
"Walking Awake"	2014	After working for years to assist members of a parasitic species to transition into new human bodies, a woman worker decides to rebel.
"The Elevator Dancer"	2018	In a repressive society, a security guard seeks a woman who he witnesses, on a surveillance camera, dancing in an elevator.
"Cuisine des Mémoires"	2018	An unbelieving man visits a restaurant that can re-create any meal from history.
"Stone Hunger"	2014	A girl tracks the stone-controlling man responsible for destroying her town. Later developed into The Fifth Season (2015).
"On the Banks of the River Lex"	2010	Death travels across a post-apocalyptic New York City and interacts with other personifications, such as Sleep and Nursery Rhymes.
"The Narcomancer"	2007	A religious leader is pressured to procreate with a woman though he does not wish to break his vow of celibacy. Later developed into The Killing Moon (2012).
"Henosis"	2017	A writer interacts with a fan before and after an award ceremony.
"Too Many Yesterdays, Not Enough Tomorrows"	2004	In a vastly depopulated world that resets every day, survivors maintain social interactions via electronic communication.
"The You Train"	2007	A woman encounters mysterious subway cars in New York City.
"Non-Zero Probabilities"	2009	After the laws of probabilities abruptly change, affecting only New York City, a woman learns to accept the new reality.
"Sinners, Saints, Dragons, and Haints, in the City Beneath the Still Waters"	2010	A man stranded in New Orleans during its 2005 Hurricane Katrina flooding event seeks supplies but is being followed by spirits.

== Publication and reception ==
The book was published by Orbit Books, a speculative fiction imprint of the Hachette Book Group. It was released as a hardcover on November 28, 2018, and then as a paperback a year later. An audio book version, narrated by Shayna Small, was published by the Hachette Audio imprint. The book was nominated for the 2019 World Fantasy Award—Collection award and recognized with an Alex Award from the American Library Association. The book won the 2019 Locus Award for Best Collection.

Both Booklist and Library Journal noted the book was suitable for general science fiction and fantasy fans, in addition to admirers of Jemisin's novels. The reviewer for the Los Angeles Times wrote that "some of Jemisin's strongest stories [such as "Red Dirt Witch"] deal explicitly with the horrors of racism in a world that is recognizably our own." In her review for NPR, speculative fiction writer Amal El-Mohtar found that "Jemisin's strengths lie at the intersection of character and setting ... [and] I especially loved how beautifully and effectively Jemisin writes food and cooking", citing "The Narcomancer", "Stone Hunger" and "Cuisine des Mémoires" as among the best, with "Those Who Stay and Fight" and "The Brides of Heaven" as leaving her dissatisfied. Writing for Locus magazine, Gary K. Wolfe states: "Jemisin's fiction can be angry or funny or dreamlike or bitter, sometimes all at the same time, but it keeps bringing us back to that observation of a character from "Walking Awake": all the monsters we really need are right here already."

== Awards ==
Award	Result	Ref.
Alex Award	Won	
British Fantasy Award for Best Collection	Nominated	
Locus Award for Best Collection	Won	
World Fantasy Award for Best Collection	Nominated	
