= Mass Effect: Andromeda (book series) =

Novel trilogy

- The cover to Nexus Uprising, the first book in the trilogy
- Author: Jason M. Hough and K. C. Alexander (Nexus Uprising); N. K. Jemisin and Mac Walters (Initiation); Catherynne M. Valente (Annihilation)
- Language: English
- Series: Mass Effect
- Genre: Science fiction, space opera
- Publisher: Titan Books
- Publication date: March 21, 2017 (Nexus Uprising); November 28, 2017 (Initiation); November 6, 2018 (Annihilation)
- Publication place: Canada/United States
- Media type: Print (Paperback), E-book, Audiobook

The Mass Effect: Andromeda book series consists of a trilogy of science fiction novels based on the Mass Effect series of video games. The books in the series are Nexus Uprising (2017), Initiation (2017), and Annihilation (2018). All three books are released in paperback, e-book, and audiobook. The audiobook formats of Nexus Uprising and Initiation are narrated by Fryda Wolff, the voice of Sara Ryder, while the Annihilation audiobook is narrated by Tom Taylorson, the voice of Scott Ryder.

The books serve as tie-in prequel and sequel stories to the video game Mass Effect: Andromeda by BioWare. All three novels in the series received generally favorable reviews, with many reviewers regarding the series to be superior to the game in terms of characterization and writing. Initiation and Annihilation in particular had a very positive reception, with some critics praising the involvement of their respective authors, N. K. Jemisin and Catherynne M. Valente, who are notable novelists in their own right.

== Background ==
In June 2016, Titan Books announced that it would publish a series of four novels which will become part of the overarching Mass Effect series. The focus would be on key characters from Mass Effect: Andromeda game and "answer the many questions fans have been asking". The publishing company also revealed that the first novel, to be written by author N. K. Jemisin, would be released in August 2016. The second and third novels were slated for release in March 2017 and September 2017 respectively and did not have author credits at the time of the June 2016 announcement. The fourth and final was to be penned by Mac Walters, the creative director of the Mass Effect series and lead writer of Mass Effect 3.

Titan Books made a further announcement in December 2016 and confirmed that there would be three tie-in novels for Mass Effect: Andromeda instead of four. The publisher said that the novels take place concurrently with events in Mass Effect: Andromeda and feature storylines developed in close collaboration between the publisher and BioWare game development team. The first book was subtitled Nexus Uprising, written by Jason M. Hough and K.C. Alexander, which would be released on March 28, 2017. The second book was subtitled Annihilation by Catherynne M. Valente and slated for a summer 2017 release, while Initiation by N.K. Jemesin, which was initially expected to be the first novel in the series, arriving in fall 2017.

Walters explained in an interview with Eurogamer that as part of BioWare's joint venture with Titan Books, he was supposed to pen a fourth book which bridges to a potential Mass Effect movie adaptation. The planned fourth novel was effectively canceled, as Walters' duties as creative director of Andromeda eventually took precedence, and development has stalled for the Mass Effect film. He explained that BioWare's position was to adopt a wait and see approach, in order to ascertain whether people "will want to see more of Andromeda before they want more of a bridge to a possible future movie", and that the trilogy of novels should serve as a good indication of fan demand for the series.

Following the launch of Mass Effect: Andromeda, the release dates for both Initiation and Annihilation were delayed. Initiation would be released in November 2017, and Annihilation was slated for release in June 2018. Following BioWare's announcement that Andromeda would not receive any single-player DLC in August 2018, Annihilation would serve to conclude loose story threads from the game's ending sequence, which includes addressing the fate of the quarian-led ark ship.

== Synopsis ==
=== Setting and characters ===
Titan Books' outline for the Mass Effect Andromeda book series in its April 2016 Fiction Rights Guide stated that while the earlier installments of Mass Effect focused on the defense of the Milky Way galaxy against the sentient synthetic-organic starships known as the Reapers, Andromeda is set in a new region of space with "a dramatic new direction" and a "new and deadly enemy.” The various races of the Milky Way galaxy, including the turians, salarians, asari, human, and other races plan to set up new colonies in the Andromeda Galaxy as part of the Andromeda Initiative. Some time between the events of Mass Effect 2 and Mass Effect 3, the Initiative built and launched a massive space station called the Nexus along with tens of thousands of colonists placed in cryo-sleep on a one-way, 600-year journey to Heleus Cluster located in Andromeda.

The Nexus is intended to be a center of government and diplomacy, a living area, as well as a base of operations for the new galactic community in Andromeda. However, the Nexus station sustains critical damage upon arrival, with most of the Initiative's leadership killed as a result. Producer Fabrice Condominas commented on the human ark ship Hyperion sustaining damage from a dark energy phenomenon called "The Scourge" as seen in preview trailers for the game, explaining that this is central to the story of how things did not go as planned for the colonists who arrive in Andromeda, as well as a tease of the fate of the other arks. He noted that the various colonist factions got spread out and do not know what happened to each other, and he encouraged players to read the novels which will explore these story threads in further detail.

Each novel details the events which led up to the fourth main series game, released on March 21, 2017: Nexus Uprising reveals how Sloane Kelly went from the head of security for the Andromeda Initiative to become an outlaw warlord in the game; Initiation details Cora Harper's backstory and her recruitment by the human ark Pathfinder Alec Ryder into the Andromeda Initiative; and Annihilation explores the fate of the quarian ark ship, the Keelah Si'yah, which is en route to the Andromeda galaxy and carrying a load of 20,000 colonists from various species.

=== Nexus Uprising ===
The first novel sets up the background details of certain factors at the point when the Hyperion reaches the Nexus in the game, where they find the space station largely inoperable, the founder of the Initiative Jien Garson is dead, and that several colonies set up by the Initiative have failed. Its subtitle Nexus Uprising refers to the rebellion by a faction of colonists against the remnants of the Andromeda Initiative's leadership. The narrative covers events from the time the Nexus reached the Andromeda galaxy to the moment of the rebel exile, and revolves around Sloane Kelly, who is responsible for leading security forces on the Nexus and attempts to maintain order following the initial disaster. The story details the gradual falling out between her and the Initiative's surviving leaders, culminating in her departure from the Nexus along with her supporters before the events of Mass Effect: Andromeda.

=== Initiation ===
The second novel details the backstory for Cora Harper, a secondary character in Andromeda. Initiation begins with the conclusion of her service with an asari commando unit and return to the human Systems Alliance. She finds herself uncomfortable in the presence of other humans, which is partly due to her longtime association with the asari and their society. Alec Ryder recruits Cora for the human ark ship he leads and offers her a new direction in life on behalf of the Andromeda Initiative. The narrative for Initiation follows her story before she sets off with the Hyperion for a new life in the Andromeda galaxy.

=== Annihilation ===
The third novel follows the journey of the quarian-led ark ship, Keelah Si'yah, which is carrying colonists from various Milky Way species which were not part of the other four ark ships seen in Andromeda. While en route to its destination, a disease outbreak is discovered among some of the colonists placed in cryo-sleep. Its story features several non-human characters, including the drell maintenance crew member Anax Therion, the elcor scientist Yorrik, and Senna'Nir vas Keelah Si'yah, the quarian First Officer of the Keelah Si'yah.

== Release and reception ==
Andrew Liptak from The Verge responded with enthusiasm to Titan Books' December 2016 announcement about the involvement of Jemisin and Valente with the book series, claiming that it felt "like Isaac Asimov or Arthur C. Clarke coming down from the mountain to write a Star Wars novel". Liptak noted that Jemisin won the 2015 Hugo Award for Best Novel for The Fifth Season while Valente is a multi-award-winning author who won acclaim for her Fairyland series, and that these "authors could add a new flavor to the next Mass Effect novels".

Nexus Uprising met with varying reviews. Matt Heywood was of the view that as a tie-in novel, Nexus Uprising competently added more understanding to the plot of Andromeda, as it fleshes out the events that took place prior to the events of the game. While he considered it a mandatory read for players, he felt that it is also an entertaining sci-fi book for science fiction enthusiasts who are unfamiliar or indifferent to the video game series. Keri Honea from Playstation Lifestyle thoroughly enjoyed the book, and expressed a bewilderment as to "why the game wasn’t written half this well". Brendan Lowry from Windows Central said he liked the book due to its unique premise, noting that "this survival type of story is something that hasn't really been explored with Mass Effect before". He considered Nexus Uprising to be a good prequel to the video game, and also explains why the Nexus ended up in its run down state when encountered in the game. Sci-Fi & Scary scored the novel 3 out of 5 Stars, concluding that it was a good book which fell short of greatness, and the authors did a solid effort of making the extensive cast of characters "distinct from each other". Black Girl Nerds scored the novel 3.5 out of 5 Stars, praising it as a worthwhile read but criticized the dull, slow pace of the middle chapters as its main weakness. Jacek "Pottero” Stankiewicz from the Polish website Nerdheim scored the book 6 out of 10.

Liz Bourke from Tor.com praised the authors of Initiation for writing a fun book which has the feel of the original Mass Effect trilogy, noting that it is more light-hearted in tone than co-author Jemisin’s original solo work. She praised the novel for being "fast-paced and full of action", and that it successfully maintains its tension throughout the narrative. Bourke found the novel's version of Cora Harper to be a recognizable version of the video game character, but one who's more fully-fleshed-out. She compared the Andromeda book series favorably to previous novel tie-ins, which she considered have failed to live up to the standards of excellence set by the original trilogy. Luke K from Critical Gamer found Initiation to be much more enjoyable than the game it is supposed to serve as a tie-in prequel to, noting that the reader does not need to be familiar with any other works from the Mass Effect franchise to understand or appreciate the novel. He considered the novel to be "definitive proof that a story told in this universe without player agency can most certainly work", and that Cora comes across as a likeable protagonist though her video game iteration is noted as a divisive character among players. Merrin from Speculative Chic praised Initiation as an unusual tie-in novel which is well-written and engaging, and opined that Jemisin was more competent at fleshing out character motivations and backstory then the game's writers. She was impressed by Jemisin's ability to add depth to Cora's characterization, and address plot holes from Mass Effect 3 and Andromeda within the constraints of a shorter novel.

Liz Bourke from Tor.com praised Annihilation as a "fast, tense, deeply enjoyable novel in a space opera setting", and its author for having a "deft touch with characterisation, giving us people who aren’t types, but who have interesting relationships to whole cultures that in the games are mostly glimpsed only in passing". She commented that Valente "expertly manipulates pacing and tension", so that the narrative's combination of "buddy-cop dynamics, murder mystery, investigative thriller, and unfolding disaster story comes together into a smooth and riveting whole". She felt the "conclusion to the plague problem feels a little rushed, but the character work is on point and full of feeling", and that Valente should write more material in the Mass Effect universe. Patrick Sklar from TheGamer scored the book 4.5 out of 5 stars, noting that the narrative's three story arcs are all wrapped up neatly by the author and that each conclusion was satisfying to various degrees. He singled out Yorrik as an "absolute delight" given his amusing speech patterns, and considered him to be the best elcor character the franchise has ever seen. He concluded that it will satisfy fans of the Mass Effect franchise but is not easily recommendable as an entrance for newcomers to the lore of the series. Julian Benson from PCGamesN commented that "all the missing races being off on a different ship bears more than a passing resemblance to a story from The Hitchhiker’s Guide to the Galaxy: Golgafrinchan Ark Fleet Ship B".
