= The City We Became =

2020 novel by N. K. Jemisin

- First edition
- Author: N. K. Jemisin
- Language: English
- Series: Great Cities
- Genre: Urban fantasy
- Publisher: Orbit Books
- Publication date: March 24, 2020
- Publication place: United States
- Media type: Print, e-book, audio book
- Pages: 488
- Followed by: The World We Make

The City We Became is a 2020 urban fantasy novel by American writer N. K. Jemisin. It was developed from her short story "The City Born Great,” first published in her collection How Long 'til Black Future Month? It is the first novel in her Great Cities duology and her first novel since completing her Broken Earth series.

== Plot ==
The City We Became takes place in New York City, in a world in which major cities become sentient through human avatars. After the avatar of New York falls into a supernatural coma and vanishes, five new avatars, representing the city's five boroughs, come together to fight their common enemy.

A homeless Black graffiti artist who inhabits rooftops is told he is the avatar of the city by São Paulo, the avatar of that Brazilian city, warning that avatars face a great enemy. The avatar is chased through the streets by shape-shifting creatures attempting to take over the city; he defeats them but is wounded and destroys the Williamsburg Bridge, in the process.

A gay Black graduate student new to the city gets off a train and is struck with amnesia; realizing that he is the avatar of Manhattan, he takes the name Manny. He encounters white tendrils on FDR Drive and destroys them by channeling the city's power. He encounters the Woman in White, in a park, and defeats her, with the help of Brooklyn Thomason, a black woman who is the avatar of Brooklyn. They sense the manifestation of another borough's avatar and head to Queens to find it.

On Staten Island, the borough's avatar Aislyn, a white librarian in her thirties, is approached by the Woman in White, who offers to protect Aislyn from the avatar of New York City; they bond over racist humor. Bronca Siwanoy, a Lenape woman who is the avatar of the Bronx, is threatened by the Woman in White, who vanishes, during the confrontation; Bronca, as the oldest borough, receives the historical knowledge of living cities and their enemy. Manny and Brooklyn search the Internet and sense the avatars of the Bronx and Queens, an Indian PhD student named Padmini.

At the Center, Bronca reviews a painting titled Dangerous Mental Machines (a term for Asian New Yorkers coined by H. P. Lovecraft in a racist letter) by the "Alt Artistes,” an alt-right group controlled by the Woman in White. The painting turns out to be an interdimensional portal, and the Center's staff kick out the Artistes. Manny and Brooklyn arrive in Padmini's magically protected apartment and stay the night. Bronca is offered 23 million dollars to exhibit the Alt Artistes' work by the Woman in White, disguised as Dr. White of the "Better New York Foundation.” Bronca turns her down, and the Alt Artistes doxx her and her friend from Jersey City, Veneza.

In Staten Island, Aislyn's father invites a neo-Nazi to stay with them; he sexually harasses Aislyn. She uses her powers to stop him, and leaves the house. São Paulo meets her and tries to get her to join the other avatars, only for her to hurt him with an energy wave when the Woman in White tells her that the cities are assaulting her home. At the center, Manny, Brooklyn, Padmini, and Bronca enter "cityspace" to find the city's avatar. Bronca explains that parallel dimensions are real and that cities puncture the walls between them at their birth, destroying nearby dimensions. As they exit cityspace, Hong Kong enters carrying the injured São Paulo. The group discovers that the Woman in White is using non-profits like the Foundation to weaken cities before their birth.

Manny and São Paulo find the city's avatar in the old City Hall Station but cannot awaken him. Bronca, Brooklyn, Padmini, and Hong travel to Staten Island and discover the Woman in White is R'lyeh, a city from another dimension. Aislyn sides with the Woman in White, who is holding Veneza hostage, and blasts them away with an energy wave that deposits the avatars of the boroughs and Veneza in Wall Street. Veneza transforms into the avatar of Jersey City, and together with the borough avatars, awakens New York City's avatar. The avatars burn away the Woman in White, restricting her to Staten Island. Weeks later, the avatars celebrate on the Coney Island boardwalk. Hong Kong summons the living cities to a summit in Paris to discuss the Woman in White's hold over Staten Island, and the avatar of the New York City joins the celebrating avatars of the boroughs.

== Characters ==
=== The avatars ===
- The Primary: the avatar of New York City. A queer Black homeless young man. A graffiti artist and hustler.
- Manny: the avatar of Manhattan. A queer Black man in his late 20s. When he becomes Manhattan's avatar, he loses most memory of his former life as a newly arrived PhD student, representing his role as a new New Yorker. He can allow non-avatar New Yorkers to see the Enemy if he needs to use them. He is a somewhat ruthless strategist and channels the violent cut-throat nature of Manhattan and to a lesser extent the power of the financial markets. He has a crush on the Primary and feels a need to protect him.
- Brooklyn "MC Free" Thomason: the avatar of Brooklyn. A Black, middle-aged former rapper, lawyer, and current city councilwoman. She has a child and a sick father. Her power is rooted in music: she can use it to attack and can sense the music in the city's noise.
- Bronca Siwanoy: the avatar of The Bronx. A lesbian Lenape woman in her 60s. She has a PhD, a hot temper, and a son, and works at the Bronx Art Center. She is the oldest of the six avatars and thus the holder of the city's lexicon of knowledge. She channels her power through steel-toed boots which she used to kick men who sexually harassed her when she was 11 and police informants at Stonewall when she was 17.
- Padmini Prakash: the avatar of Queens. A 25-year-old Tamil immigrant graduate student living in Queens. Her first name means "she who sits on the lotus". She can use mathematical imagination to change physical reality.
- Aislyn Houlihan: the avatar of Staten Island. A 30-year-old Irish-American woman who lives with her parents on Staten Island. Her father is an abusive, racist cop who calls her "Apple", though her name means "dream". She can become invisible.
- Veneza: the avatar of Jersey City. A young Black and Portuguese woman who works with Bronca at the Bronx Art Center.

=== Other characters ===
- São Paulo: the avatar of the city he is named for. He grew up in favela and became the avatar during the military dictatorship. He is brown-skinned, lean, and a smoker whose cigarette smoke can combat the Enemy. He is the youngest living city which is why he was tasked with helping birth New York.
- Hong Kong: the avatar of the city he is named for. He became the avatar during the Opium Wars. He has a Chinese-inflected British accent.
- R'lyeh (AKA "The Enemy"): an infectious, otherworldly life form that wants to take over the newly born city of New York. It appears in many forms, including the Woman in White, Dr. White, mind-controlling fungal fronds, and x-shaped spider-like creatures. In an interview with Time, N. K. Jemisin notes that the antagonistic forces in the book oftentimes are metaphors for gentrification.

== Reception ==
In The New York Times, Amal El-Mohtar wrote that "In the face of current events, The City We Became takes a broad-shouldered stand on the side of sanctuary, family and love. It’s a joyful shout, a reclamation and a call to arms." She comments that New York City appears with all its "mundane problems", combined with a supernatural challenge. El-Mohtar traces the work's origins to a short story that Jemisin wrote in 2016, "The City Born Great", commenting that she read it "with a mixture of admiration and alienation" as a non-New Yorker. She adds that The City We Became overcomes the short story's limitations and "explicitly welcomes the foreignness of readers like me". She finds the novel "rich and generous" despite "the easy analogues of the plot". She notes that its casting of gentrification, police brutality and white supremacy as the evil Enemy is a "clever and satisfying reversal" of H. P. Lovecraft's racist mythos, but that Jemisin doesn't stay there, but moves swiftly on to tie communities together and demonstrate the need for unity, whatever people's own prejudices may be.

Steve Mullis wrote on NPR that the novel is "a love letter, a celebration and an expression of hope and belief that a city and its people can and will stand up to darkness, will stand up to fear, and will, when called to, stand up for each other." In his view, the book is a complete break from her Broken Earth science fiction trilogy, with its setting no longer in a strange future world but in the here and now of New York City: "Or at least, a version of New York", one in which the city itself is alive. Mullis writes that what Jemisin does outstandingly well is to show a physical embodiment of evil and make it real, the "monstrous forces" convincingly paralleling the "xenophobia and racism" in writers like H. P. Lovecraft, and in the reality experienced by Jemisin herself.

Laura Miller, reviewing the book in Slate, wrote that "The city she sings fizzes so joyously through the veins of this novel that anyone mourning the New York before COVID-19 will likely find The City We Became equally sustaining and elegiac, a tribute to a city that may never fully return to us." Miller describes the novel as a "valentine" and "a full throttle paean" to the city, and suggests that she was thinking of "the Trump regime" when writing it, unknowingly presaging the tensions of the pandemic. That said, Miller finds the plot rather generic in character, and too much like a superhero film, muddling up various genres. In her view, the basis of the novel is more like an urban fairy tale than an epic fantasy or science fiction story, and Jemisin should have followed the conventions of fairy tale by omitting detail to allow the metaphors to flourish through the unsaid. Miller comments that that is tricky to do, as the author has to trust the reader to find meaning in what is not spelt out.

== Awards and honors ==
Year	Award	Category	Result	Ref.
2020	BSFA Award	Novel	Won	
2020	Kitschies	Novel (Red Tentacle)	Finalist	
2020	Kitschies	Inky Tentacle	Finalist	
2020	Los Angeles Times Book Prize	Ray Bradbury Prize	Finalist	
2020	Nebula Award	Novel	Finalist	
2021	British Fantasy Award	Fantasy Novel (the Robert Holdstock Award)	Finalist	
2021	Hugo Award	Novel	Finalist	
2021	Ignyte Awards	Adult Novel	Finalist	
2021	Locus Award	Fantasy Novel	Won	
2021	Gotham Book Prize	Fiction	Finalist	
