= The Moral Philosopher and the Moral Life =

Essay by William James

"The Moral Philosopher and the Moral Life" is an essay by the philosopher William James, which he first delivered as a lecture to the Yale Philosophical Club, in 1891. It was later included in the collection, The Will to Believe and other Essays in Popular Philosophy.

He drew a distinction between three questions in ethics: the psychological, the metaphysical, and the casuistic.

"The psychological question asks after the historical origin of our moral ideas and judgments; the metaphysical question asks what the very meaning of the words 'good,' 'ill,' and 'obligation' are; the casuistic question asks what is the measure of the various goods and ills which men recognize, so that the philosopher may settle the true order of human obligations."

== The psychological question ==
As James sees it, the psychological question is whether human ideas of good and evil arise from "the association of [certain ideals] with act of simple bodily pleasures and reliefs from pain." He believes that some elements of our moral sentiment do have such a source, and that Jeremy Bentham and his followers have done the world a lasting service by pointing that out.

But he doesn't believe that association and pleasure/pain calculus are adequate to account for the psychology of morality. One must also admit innate, brain-born ideas or tendencies.

In a famous passage that recalls some of Dostoyevsky's work, James wrote that "if the hypothesis were offered of a world in which Messrs Fourier's and Bellamy's and Morris' utopias should all be outdone, and millions kept permanently happy on the one simple condition that a certain lost soul on the far-off edge of things should lead a life of lonely torture," most people would feel that the enjoyment of such a utopia would be a "hideous thing" at such a cost. That feeling, he infers, must be brain born. The passage was the inspiration for Ursula K. Le Guin's short story "The Ones Who Walk Away from Omelas (Variations on a theme by William James)".

== The metaphysical question ==
The gist of this section is the contention that to be good, something has to be desired, by some sentient being.

A world of only rocks would have no good or bad. A world with one thinking being in it would have plenty of good and bad—some things would work out as that being wanted them, others wouldn't. It could even have moral conflict of a sort, as that one thinker may have trouble rendering his own ideals consistent with one another.

From such considerations, James concludes that "claim" and "obligation" are two sides of the same coin. Without a claim actually made by some concrete person there can be no obligation, but there is obligation wherever there is a claim.

== The casuistic question ==
But this resolution of the metaphysical question only makes the casuistic question (settling the true order of human obligations) seem hopelessly difficult. If everything that anyone could want of me, or that I could want from myself, be considered an obligation, then my obligations are hopelessly in conflict with one another.

"The various ideals [operating in the world] have no common character apart from the fact that they are ideals. No single abstract principle can be so used as to yield to the philosopher anything like a scientifically accurate and genuinely useful casuistic scale." How, then, shall I make choices? How shall I live?

James' answer is that history is resolving this problem for us, and our task is to co-operate in the process by which it does so, by which apparently irreconciliable demands are reconciled over time. One might say, although the terminology would be foreign to him, that he found his ethics within a pluralist meta-ethics.

== Original publishing history ==
James, William: "The Moral Philosopher and the Moral Life" – International Journal of Ethics, volume 1, number 3 (April 1891), pp. 330–354

The essay was also featured in:

- James, William: The Will to Believe and Other Essays in Popular Philosophy. First edition: Longmans, Green, 1897.
