= Emergency Skin =

Science-fiction novellete

- Cover to Emergency Skin
- Author: N. K. Jemisin
- Audio read by: Jason Isaacs
- Language: English
- Series: Forward
- Genre: Science fiction
- Publisher: Amazon Original Stories
- Publication date: September 17, 2019
- Pages: 33
- Awards: Hugo Award, Audie Award, Ignyte Award

Emergency Skin is a science fiction novelette written by N. K. Jemisin. The story was first published by Amazon Original Stories as part of the Forward short fiction collection in September 2019. The story was well received, and it was awarded a Hugo Award, an Audie Award (for the audiobook), and an Ignyte Award in 2020.

== Plot ==
The unnamed protagonist lives on an exoplanet colony that was founded when the collapse of life on Earth (called Tellus in the story) was deemed inevitable. He, like all other lower-class people in the colony, has a synthetic body rather than skin, which is reserved for the colony's "Founders" and other elite. Aided by a collective AI implanted in his brain, he is sent on a mission to Tellus to retrieve HeLa cell cultures that his planet needs to survive.

However, when he arrives there, he discovers that Earth is lush and beautiful, not the lifeless husk he was led to believe, and that he is far from the first of his kind to come there on a cell culture mission. He is surprised to see the diversity of Earth's population, including women, the disabled, and the elderly, which his world does not tolerate. Fascinated by this and the altruism he experiences, instead of returning to his ship with the cells, he activates his "emergency skin," a layer of nanites that form synthetic skin, and stays on Earth to learn more.

An old man brings him to a museum and shows him what happened after the Founders left the planet to form their colony: everyone left on Earth abandoned country borders and individual property, pooling all their resources and working together to prevent the planet's destruction. The protagonist realizes that the Founders deliberately kept this information from everyone else on the colony so that they could continue to hoard resources as the elite, and that they kill everyone who returns from missions to Earth so that they cannot tell anyone the truth. Furthermore, the cell cultures are needed by his planet's elites in order to maintain their immortality, not just for their survival. The story ends with him disabling the collective AI in his brain and resolving to return to his colony to start a revolution against the Founders.

== Themes ==
=== Mutualism ===
Emergency Skin delves into the theme of mutualism. Mutualism occurs when two or more species interact with one another and all parties have a net benefit. The main character is taken to a museum by an older man on Earth (or Tellus as referred to by the Founders). There, the main character learns of the cause of the environment catastrophe on Earth and what led up to the "Great Leaving." In response the inquiry made about why the former United States didn't have a name anymore, the older man answered:

“We realized it was impossible to protect any one place if the place next door was drowning or on fire. We realized the old boundaries weren’t meant to keep the undesirable out, but to hoard resources within. And the hoarders were the core of the problem.” Jemisin, N. K.. Emergency Skin (Forward collection) (p. 19). Kindle Edition.

This assertion reveals the parasitotic relationship humanity had with the land and with one another. When hierarchal structures are put into place, a select few at the top are the only ones who benefit. It can be argued that borders are a distraction and hinderance to mutualism and community because building a community takes a level of sacrifice. In Shelley Streeby's Imagining the Future of Climate Change: World-Making through Science Fiction and Activism, Streeby discusses the work of Octavia E. Butler and her critiques on short-lived growth at the detriment of the environment. Butler describes the relationship between humans and the Earth as parasitic. Streeby states that:

"'They spend their tomorrows today' is a critique Butler leveled repeatedly at neoliberals who sacrifice the future for short-term gains and economic growth in the present, prioritizing immediate profits over water, the climate, and the earth." Streeby, Shelley. Imagining the Future of Climate Change : World-Making Through Science Fiction and Activism, University of California Press, 2018.

This sentiment is explored in N.K. Jemisin's Emergency Skin. Earth was described to be in great disarray. Bodies of water had dried up and the conditions were not the best to support human life. When the Founders discovered this, they took as much resources as they could and left Earth, leaving anyone they deemed undesirable behind, and also leaving their home behind. Human beings are symbionts, but at this stage, they were parasitic. When the Founders left Earth, there was an opportunity to ignite real change. This starts with the mind and then the removal of barriers:

“To save the world, people had to think differently...Yes, some new technology emerged once everyone was permitted a decent education. But there was no trick to it. No quick fix. The problem wasn’t technological.”

What, then?

“I told you. People just decided to take care of each other.” Jemisin, N. K.. Emergency Skin (Forward collection) (p. 19). Kindle Edition.

When the main character discovers that the old man that has been hosting him was a "traitor," the old man reveals why he took him to the museum and the true cause for the past world's detriment.

"The idea of doing something without immediate benefit, something that might only pay off in ten, twenty, or a hundred years, something that might benefit people they disliked, was anathema to the Founders. Even though that was precisely the kind of thinking that the world needed to survive...What the Leaving proved was that the Earth could sustain billions, if we simply shared resources and responsibilities in a sensible way. What it couldn’t sustain was a handful of hateful, self-important parasites, preying upon and paralyzing everyone else. As soon as those people left, the paralysis ended.” Jemisin, N. K.. Emergency Skin (Forward collection) (p. 21). Kindle Edition.

Jemison is critiquing the ruling class and one percent; those who are affluent and in power. To get rid of this parasitotic relationship human beings had with their environment and with one another, those who are selfish and individualistic in their pursuits have to be removed and a new way of thinking must be employed. in order to move away from parasitic dynamics to a more mutualistic relationship, humans have to start with taking care of one another and taking care of the land in which we originate. Jemisin is offering an optimistic solution to climate change and environmental catastrophe. This solution in the journey to a mutualistic relationship between human and Earth could fall under Optopia, a term often used by Kim Stanley Robinson, but was first coined by Joanna Russ. In an interview with Annett Mikes and Steve New in the article How to Create an Optopia? - Kim Stanley Robinson's "Ministry for the Future" and the Politics of Hope, Stanley Robinson discussed what an optopia is:

"Kim Stanley Robinson: In Ministry, I set out to imagine a positive history that gets us to a better state. It’s possible that utopia is not the right word here. Joanna Russ made up the term ‘optopia’, which denotes not a perfect society, but the optimum society, the best one possible given where we are now. We have a moral obligation to find that optopia."

Stanley Robinson was also interviewed by Bloomberg in August 2023 on How to Write a Climate Thriller Fit for Page or Screen, in reference to optopia, stated that:

"It's not the utopia — the no place, the perfect place,” Robinson says. “It's the optimum that we can do given the situation that we're handed. If we dodge a climate catastrophe and a mass extinction event in this century, that's a utopian story.”

N.K. Jemisin embodies this ideology in Emergency Skin. Once the Founders left Earth, the people left behind had a lot of work to do to get their home back on track and engage in a mutualistic relationship with the planet, but this is something that takes time, effort, sacrifice, and realism.

== Reception ==
Kirkus Reviews called it a subversive story that "shatters all expectations". AudioFile reviewer Emily Connelly found that the brief story cleverly conveyed both alarm and curiosity as to how the thriving society story could sustain itself. She also praised the audio performance of Jason Isaacs for immersing listeners in the story as if they were on the mission as well, giving it an Earphone Award for the month. The story was later collected in The Year’s Best Science Fiction, Vol 1: The Saga Anthology of Science Fiction 2020 as well, where Publishers Weekly highlighted it as a standout of the "year's best" anthology.

=== Accolades ===
In 2020, Emergency Skin received the following awards and nominations:

Award	Result	Ref.
Audie Award for Science Fiction	Won	
Hugo Award for Best Novelette	Won	
Ignyte Award for Best Novelette	Won	
Locus Award for Best Novelette	Finalist	
