= The Shadowed Sun =

2012 fantasy novel by N.K. Jemisin

- Author: N.K. Jemisin
- Language: English
- Series: Dreamblood Duology
- Release number: 2
- Genre: Fantasy literature
- Published: 12 Jun 2012
- Publisher: Orbit Books
- Publication place: United States
- Pages: 528
- ISBN: 9780316187299
- Preceded by: The Killing Moon

The Shadowed Sun is a 2012 fantasy novel by N.K. Jemisin. It is the final novel in her Dreamblood Duology, following The Killing Moon. The Shadowed Sun takes place ten years after the first novel and explores a rebellion against the Kisuati occupation of the city of Gujaareh, as well as a plague of nightmares sweeping through the city.

== Plot ==
The story takes place ten years after the Kisuati occupation of Gujaareh.

Hanani is a Sharer-Apprentice and the only woman in the Hetawa. During a healing trial in which Hanani hopes to become a Sharer, two people die. Initially, the Hetawa's leadership blames Hanani, but it soon becomes clear that a plague of nightmares is spreading through the city. Also in Gujaareh, the wealthy noble Sanfi and his daughter Tiaanet plot to overthrow the Kisuati occupiers. Unbeknownst to the public, Tiaanet's father sexually abuses her.

Meanwhile, outside the city, the story follows a surviving son of King Eninket named Wanahomen. Wana lives in exile with the desert tribe known as the Yusir Banbarra. The six Banbarra tribes are traditionally enemies of Gujaareh, but begin courting them as allies against the Kisuati occupiers. Wana hopes to overthrow the Kisuati Protectorate and rule Gujaareh as its Prince.

Gatherer Nijiri asks Hanani to free Gujaareh from Kisua's control; this will serve as her new trial and make her a full Sharer. The Hetawa agrees to support Wana and the Banbarra. Hanani and her mentor Mni-inh are sent as hostages with Wana. Wana calls a conclave of the six Banbarra tribes to vote on whether or not to go to war against Kisua. Mni-inh is killed by the nightmare plague. Wanahomen and the Banbarra agree to go to war.

Meanwhile, Sanfi and Tiaanet discuss Tantufi, a child who is the source of the nightmares. They plan to use her to spread the nightmare plague and undermine the Hetawa. Tantufi is later revealed to be their daughter. The Banbarra invade Gujaareh and go to the Hetawa. Unfortunately, the Kisuati have already taken control of the temple and are keeping hostages there, including Tiaanet and Tantufi. Hanani recognizes Tantufi as the source of the nightmares. Hanani destroys Tantufi's soul, realizing that the young girl would never be able to find peace otherwise. Tiaanet returns to her home and kills Sanfi; she then leaves the city.

Wanahomen is crowned Prince. Kisua is driven from Gujaareh. Hanani becomes a full Sharer, but decides to leave the Hetawa and become a healer for the Banbarra. Wanahomen proposes marriage, and she accepts.

== Reception ==
Stefan Raets of Reactor called the novel "absolutely brilliant" and a "modern classic." Raets stated that the "writing is once again simply gorgeous, combining elegance with density in a way that feels deceptively effortless, but is clearly a labor of love." The same review praised the complexity of the characters and the inclusion of various different societies within the world of the novel, stating that the "level of moral complexity is amazing: there are very few people who are purely good or evil, and many more who are occasionally willing to stray into the grey area to accomplish their goals. We meet characters whose mentalities are completely alien, not only to our sensibilities but also to those of people who live within traveling distance in the same world."

Publishers Weekly wrote that the "political intrigue and unusual setting are compelling and satisfying". The review praised Jemisin for eschewing "simplistic adventure tropes for a nuanced approach" in which some Kisuati are good and some Barbarra are despicable. The review criticized the characters, which often "fall flat", as well as the romance between Wanahomen and Hanani. The review called the inclusion of rape and abuse "discomfortingly prominent." Kirkus Reviews wrote that "it's easy to become absorbed in Jemisin's patient if sometimes pedantic attention to detail and emotionally complex characters. Otherwise, the plot lacks the tension of the first book, with much of it more embroidery than substance." The review concludes that the novel is "overstuffed and underpowered" but that fans of the first novel would still enjoy it.
