= Far Sector =

Comic book limited series

Publication information
- Publisher: DC Comics
- Format: Limited series
- Genre: Superhero
- Publication date: 2019–2021
- No. of issues: 12
- Main character: Green Lantern Sojourner Mullein

Creative team
- Written by: Nora Keita Jemisin
- Artist: Jamal Campbell
- Letterer: Daron Bennett
- Colorist: Jamal Campbell

Far Sector is a comic book miniseries in the DC Comics Green Lantern franchise, published from 2019 to 2021 by DC's imprint Young Animal. The Green Lantern of the series is Sojourner Mullein, created by science fiction and fantasy writer Nora Keita Jemisin. Far Sector won the 2022 Hugo Award for Best Graphic Story or Comic. Far Sector also received several more award nominations: three Eisner Awards nominations, a GLAAD Media Award for Outstanding Comic Book nomination, and an Ignyte Award. The series has an average critic rating of 8.7 out of 10 based on 169 reviews on the review aggregator website Comic Book Roundup.

== Plot Summary for Volume 1-12 ==
Far Sector takes place on a Dyson swarm called the City Enduring. The City is divided into several platforms. It is home to 20 billion members from three species: the winged Nah; the plant-based keh-Topli, who occasionally engage in reverent and consensual consumption of sentient species; and the @At, digital beings who can take physical form using light projectors. The three species initially lived on two separate planets until the Burnover, when they destroyed their homeworlds during a war sparked by the Cloud Kratocracy (an empire of powerful alien conquerors that the three species drove to extinction). To prevent further conflict, the three species bioengineered a virus called the Emotion Exploit to tone down their emotions. Although it limited their ability to create entertainment, the Exploit prevented them from making rash and destructive decisions. They then came together to create the City from the remains of their planets. Since then, the three species have lived peacefully under the rule of the Trilogy Council for centuries. The Trilogy Council consists of one member of each species; they are elected by their respective species, their position is lifelong, and their power is unrestricted.

In Platform Ever Forward, a district of the City, the first murder in 500 years has occurred. An autopsy and an analysis of the suspect's stomach contents show that the victim, Stevn of the Glacier, was eaten. Sojourner "Jo" Mullein and Peace Accountant Syzn discuss the murder with the Council, consisting of the Nah Marth, the @At @Blaze-of-Glory, and the keh-Topli Averrup. They believe that the keh-Topli suspect, Meile Thorn, was under the influence of Switchoff, a drug that nullifies the Emotion Exploit. After the council meeting concludes, Jo goes to see Meile. Upon entering Meile's jail cell, Jo discovers that Meile has just been killed, and the Nah perpetrator flees the cell. Sojourner pursues the Nah, but fails to capture her.

Jo goes to Marth's home to ask him for contact information so she can speak to Stevn's family. During their meeting, Marth makes multiple romantic gestures and reveals that he and Council members in the past have taken Switchoff.

The next day, Syzn messages Jo asking her to quell an unapproved protest of over a hundred thousand people in Platform Forget Not. The protest consists of Switchoff users, who want the Exploit abolished, and counter-protestors who want Switchoff banned and the Emotion Exploit to be kept active. Jo calms down the protestors by promising to give the Council the Switchoff users' viewpoints, but Marth orders firing on the protestors in order to "keep the peace". Jo uses her powers to shield the unarmed protestors, minimizing fatalities, and chastises the Peace Division officers for their attack.

After the protest, An, Stevn's wife, signals Jo. She reveals that she organized the protest, believing her husband wouldn't have died if the keh-Topli who ate him had the opportunity to learn to regulate her emotions so Meile could have learned to control her desire safely. They demand that Jo presents their demand to the Council or the protests will continue even with the threat of being killed by the Peace Department.

The next day, Jo brings the protestors' concerns to the Council, who, believing that the Switchoff epidemic is out of control and knowing that murder and civil unrest have occurred the previous twelve times citizens called for an end of the Exploit, has turned their focus from preventing additional murders to preventing dissolution of the City at any cost. Jo swears that as long as she is around, she will protect the City from the violence of the Council.

A week later, the Council formally apologizes for their deadly use of force and sets a date for a referendum on the Exploit. Jo searches through information about purchasing Switchoff, but the drug is purchased from throwaway companies using untraceable cryptocurrencies. Canhaz, Jo's assistant, mentions that she and many other @At have spent years mining cryptocurrency when times were rough. This leads Jo to remember her life on Earth where she joined the army and then the police force in an attempt to make the world a fairer place. A Guardian praised Jo for her commitment to justice and reporting her partner for police brutality before her firing, and offered her a position as a Green Lantern.

Jo meets with An again, who knows that the Council will likely ignore the demands of the people but the protestors will fight for change anyway. The discussion reignites Jo's concerns that she is being used by the Council to uphold the status quo instead of protecting the City's people. Jo gets a call from Averrup, who believes that Meile was not acting out of her own volition when she ate Stevn, as she was a strict vegetarian and much of Stevn's body remained.

Three days later, Marth comes to Jo's apartment to apologize for his order and to reveal that he will resign from his position after the referendum. He also tells her that he takes Switchoff to reflect on the decisions he makes as a Councilor under the Exploit. The two talk further discuss Marth's experiences with Switchoff, then make out and have intercourse.

The morning after, Averrup calls Jo and asks her to immediately come to his location. Jo calls Syzn for backup, then she and Canhaz fly to a wholesale warehouse in Platform Ever Forward. Jo enters the building and is attacked by armor machines from the long defunct Cloud Kratocracy. The machines are piloted by Nah and keh-Topli pilots, including an unresponsive Averrup. Canhaz suspects that the pilot's bodies have been killed and taken over by @At, who can control biological beings by taking over their nervous systems. An outraged Jo destroys the machines. Canhaz detects that the @At have escaped the pilot's bodies into the City Network, the City's equivalent to the internet. Jo uses her ring to enter the City Network with Canhaz to track down the @At pilots in Atville. After exploring Atville, the two confront and capture the three suspects. When interrogated, the suspects reveal that they had little knowledge of the details behind their job. They state that they were tasked with taking over Meile's body under the request of their anonymous employer and were instructed to kill anyone using her body.

Havesh Stump replaces Averrup as the Councilor. He questions if it is proper for the emotional Jo to carry on the investigation, while Blaze-of-Glory believes that the @At suspects were being exploited by the returning Cloud Kratocracy. Jo storms out of the Council meeting, accusing the Council of not taking responsibility and for not letting her do her job. Marth apologizes for the Council's behavior and tells Jo to look up the Feelsnet.

The next day, Jo and Canhaz are at a diner. Canhaz states that due to their dependence on digital media for nutrition and currency, the @At originally voted against the Exploit. She also notes that the majority of the other two races did not want it either, but the Nah Councilor of the time secretly applied it to the whole city. Canhaz then tells her that the Feelsnet is used for the exchange of illegal or scarce content, particularly memes made by residents of the City. Jo realizes that Switchoff users are being used as a black market commodity since they become emotional enough to produce creative content.

Jo goes to Platform Solid Ground to investigate a tip from Marth. Syzn doubts Marth's trustworthiness, and warns Jo about the risk she is taking, as Jo's ring is still low on power after the trip to Atville and Jo has refused backup. Jo flies to what appears to be a secret military facility. She knocks out a guard, takes their clothing, and sneaks into the building. She finds out that the building is a sweatshop-like facility filled with residents who are forced to take Switchoff to produce intellectual property and are collared to prevent escape.

Jo is captured by security guards after she reveals herself as the Green Lantern to fight guards forcibly giving Switchoff to a resident. Syzn meets Jo in the CEPD headquarters, asking Jo to plead "temporary emotional insanity" as an explanation for her actions, and tells her that dealing with the Switchoff facilities is too complicated to take care of before tomorrow's Exploit referendum. Jo realizes that Meile was one of the residents, and was used by Switchoff dealers after she escaped to set an example. She commands Syzn to not let the sweatshops or the murders be swept under the rug because of the Council's apathy.

Syzn allows Marth to visit Jo the next morning. With help from Canhaz and the CEPD, Jo has figured out that Marth owns the sweatshop (as well as multiple others) and is the main funder of Switchoff production. Marth explains that his ancestor was the one who imposed the Exploit, and while it served its purpose in the past, he wants to end it without disrupting the status quo so much that fortunes and power are disrupted. He is using the facilities to fund a revolution, and gave Jo the "tip" so she could investigate if the facility she entered wasn't using voluntary residents like the others. He and Averrup asked for a Green Lantern so they could use her to encourage support for the referendum. Syzn comes in to arrest Marth for trafficking and conspiracy to murder under Glory's request. Canhaz calls Jo to tell her that the Council has shut down half of the referendum voting servers, limiting the ability to vote, especially for the @At. Jo, Canhaz, and Marth enter the Council chambers to confront Glory, who has ordered the military to fire on rioters angry at their ability to vote being impeded (although they refuse to do so). Glory explains that she was waiting for the referendum since the CEPD's forces would be spread thin so she could take control of a military and use force against the biological civilians.

The chamber is suddenly rocked by an explosion. Lumir, the Council's seneschal and an anti-Exploit supporter, states that it is an antibomb (small weapons of mass destruction that release antimatter pulses) and more will go off all over the City if the referendum servers don't come back online. Since the illegal weapons are powerful enough to destroy the solar radiation-blocking shields that surround the City, Marth begs Glory to call off her coup so citizens don't resort to wiping themselves out to be free of the Exploit. Glory, certain that @At can survive the bombings, severely injures Marth and continues. Jo damages a projector, preventing Glory from being able to manifest physically to make it difficult for her to command the military. Meanwhile, An's rebel group and members of the CEPD fight the military to protect the screen generators while the digital @At prevent Glory from launching a cyberattack. Marth reveals that he used the money he made from selling Switchoff to hire the remainders of the Cloud Kratocracy as a contingency plan since he suspected Glory to be planning something.

Jo goes to fight off the Kratocracy fleet. The Widening Chasm, a City spaceship, is shooting at the City, so she damages and enters it. She meets with the captain, Marth's sister Minec. Jo asks CanHaz to broadcast their conversion to the surrounding ships, then criticizes Minec for her willingness to follow Glory's orders. Minec responds that she is only acting logically, as the situation of the City is completely out of control. Jo states that the City's problem isn't rooted in emotion, but rather the distribution of power, and fighting for order rather than justice isn't making the world a better place. Minec, agreeing with Jo, declares a ceasefire.

The servers come back online allowing voting to be completed; the referendum passes with a clear majority in favor of ending the Exploit, and the Council honors the result. Glory is imprisoned and awaiting trial for treason while Stump is forced out of the Council. Marth, being the only council member left, has his resignation postponed. New councilors will be elected within three months. Plans for the gradual transition off of the Exploit are being made. Jo and Syzn (the latter trying Switchoff for the first time) have a picnic together. When Jo returns to her apartment, CanHaz gives her a letter from her father back on Earth. Jo reminisces on her time in the City, realizing how much she loves it and wonders what her next six months assigned there will be like.

The story concludes with her reciting the Green Lantern Oath.

== Characters ==
=== Major ===
- Sojourner "Jo" Mullein is an ex-soldier and ex-cop turned Green Lantern who is assigned to the Far Sector, the farthest of the Guardian's jurisdiction, for one year. She quit the military feeling like she wasn't doing enough to improve the world and regrets standing idly as her partner severely beat up a suspect shortly before she was removed from the police force. She is given a special Power Ring that slowly recharges on its own instead of needing to recharge with a battery. The City asked the Guardians for her aid due to growing unrest in the city. She is the only person in the City Enduring legally allowed to be exempt from the Exploit. The City's conflicts frequently remind her of those back on Earth, making her frustrated and disillusioned, but more determined to protect civilians.
- Syzn "Siz" of the Cliffs, by the Streaking Ice: Peace Accountant and head of the City Enduring Peace Department (CEPD) of Platform Ever Forward, she is roommates with Jo and they once dated. She is surprised by how rational Jo is despite having emotions.
- @Blaze-of-Glory: A councilor representing the @At, her name is often shortened to Glory. She secretly conspires to take control of the City Enduring. She didn't believe the City needed a Green Lantern, and greatly resents Jo's presence.
- Averrup Thorn of the Dry Season Thorns: A councilor representing the keh-Topli, he respects Jo more than the other Council members. After his death, he is succeeded by Havesh Stump.
- Marth of the Sea, by the Wavering Dark, Until the Sun Falls: A councilor representing the Nah, he is romantically interested in Jo. He is described as manipulative and sentimental, and he secretly planned a revolution to end the Emotion Exploit.
- @ICanHazEarthStuff01: Sojourner's assistant, she is nicknamed @ICHES or Canhaz. She helps Jo get access to Earth media as well as search through and analyze data from the City Network. She enjoys cat memes. She is usually present in a physical form, but often travels in Jo's headset in a digital form.

=== Minor ===
- Stevn of the Glacier: A Nah education drone administrator who becomes the first murder victim of the City Enduring in 500 years.
- Meile Thorn: A keh-Topli librarian who is suspected of killing and eating Stevn. Before she can be interrogated, an unidentified Nah kills her in her jail cell. It is later revealed that a hired @At took over her body to kill Stevn, then the Nah attacked her in her jail cell to cover up her true nature behind her death.
- Lumir of the Cliffs, by the Wavering Dark: Seneschal of the Council, he is in favor of ending the Exploit. During Glory's coup, he is shot by her due to attempting to incapacitate her.
- An of the Glacier: Widow of Stevn and a leader of the anti-Exploit protests.
- Minec of the Sea, by the Streaking Ice, Until the Sun Falls: Marth's younger and more vicious sister, she is the admiral of the City Defence Fleet, which defends against extraterrestrial threats.

== Collected editions ==
Format	Issues collected	Pages	Publication date	ISBN
Trade paperback	Far Sector #1–12	312	Oct 19, 2021	978-1779512055
DC Compact	Far Sector #1–12	296	July 2, 2024	978-1779527295
Deluxe hardcover	Far Sector #1–12, Green Lantern 80th Anniversary 100-Page Super Spectacular #1; DC Pride #1; DC Power: A Celebration #1; DC Power 2024 #1	320	Feb 11, 2025	978-1779512055
