= Non-Zero Probabilities =

Speculative fiction short story

- Short story by N. K. Jemisin
- Language: English
- Genre(s): Speculative fiction

Publication
- Published in: Clarkesworld Magazine
- Media type: Online (Magazine)
- Publication date: September 2009

"Non-Zero Probabilities" is a speculative fiction short story by N. K. Jemisin, published in 2009 in Clarkesworld Magazine. The story features a semi-apocalyptic New York City where the laws of probability have shifted, and follows a young woman as she navigates a world driven by belief systems. Thematically, the short story deals largely with identity, belief, and society. It was nominated for both the Hugo and Nebula Awards, and was later published in other collections, including Jemisin's anthology How Long 'til Black Future Month? (2018).

== Plot synopsis ==
In East New York, for unknown reasons, life has become dictated by improbability and superstition. The most unlikely events have become the most likely, from highly improbable dice throws to serious infrastructure failure. Some effects are deemed good: massive lottery wins, sports successes, and cancer remissions. Others are not. Multiracial Adele uses prayers for a Christian god as well as African orishas, a selection of herbs, a Saint Christopher medal, and a collection of lucky objects as part of her daily ritual. As she walks to work, she encounters a shuttle train that has jumped the tracks because of a wrench left there (an event with a million to one odds), causing horrible carnage, and stops to help.

The news claims New York is a den of iniquity, causing this semi-apocalypse, but Adele is skeptical. Large quantities of missionaries have swarmed the city, and one corners Adele to give her a flyer for a mass prayer throughout the city on August 8 - a lucky day for the Chinese. Princeton has proved that the power of positive thought now has real effect over reality. In a chain of unlikely events, Adele is almost pushed into oncoming traffic on her walk home, but is saved by finding a four-leaf clover, which she plants in her fire escape garden.

On her way to the famers' market to barter her vegetables for fruit and news about the mass prayer, Adele gives her neighbor an eggplant. She teaches him how to cook it, and they discuss the prayer event. He is uninterested in prayer, and more noncommittal about the changed state of things. They have sex with protection - crossing fingers while putting the condom on and touching a rabbit's foot.

As the multi-denominational prayer event approaches, Adele debates going and considers the significance of belief and accepting change. She takes another flyer, folds it into a paper airplane, puts her Saint Christopher medal in it, and lets it fly until it's out of sight.

== Themes and motifs ==
=== The city and society ===
Taking place in New York City, often called a "cultural melting pot," Jemisin's story addresses the constant changes of society, and the struggles in trying to resist or adapt to it. In Brooklyn especially, where the story specifically takes place, there is an emphasis on open and diverse faith. In many respects, New York has returned to a more connected, locally-driven time in this story, although the narrative does not moralize it, using a character study approach of Adele to contemplate - somewhat ambivalently - the drawbacks and benefits of the altered world versus normalcy.

=== Heritage and belief ===
Adele is a multiracial/multiethnic protagonist - a "typical American" by the author's description - dealing with the multitude of beliefs that can occur in different cultures. The story examines the idea of choosing which parts of heritage to embrace when belief gains tangible effect, whether singular or multiple. Adele is normal, her life relatively mundane in spite of the changed world, but she is willing to explore herself and her history to encounter something new.

=== Algorithmic/performative identity ===
The story examines the cycle of meaning and behavior: belief both creates and reflects reality, and value is assigned to these concepts with the expectation that, if you perform adequately, you are leading a good life. The narrative explores the rejection of public, systemic belief systems (like group prayer) for personal ones, and the reflection this dichotomy has on our interpretations of our identity.

== Background ==
In one interview, Jemisin describes New York City as having an "inherently magical" quality that influenced her choice to use it as a setting, and says that although she is interested in probability, or "luck," she doesn't believe it has intrinsically personal qualities. However, her observation of the social impact of the 2004 World Series win in Boston and her interest in the way humans give meaning to superstitious or religious beliefs throughout human history led to her attempt to write a story about a woman attempting to integrate different aspects of her heritage with belief: religious, superstitious, and scientific.

== Recognition and reception ==
"Non-Zero Probabilities" was published in Clarkesworld Magazine (36). As a short story, it was nominated for a Nebula Award in 2009, and a Hugo Award in 2010. As part of Jemisin's short story collection, How Long 'til Black Future Month?, it received an Alex Award from the American Library Association.

In February 2010, a recorded version read by Kate Baker was produced for issue 41 of Clarkesworld Magazine's podcast. In June, this recording appeared as episode 224 of the Escape Pod podcast. The story also appeared in the 2012 limited edition collection Systems Fail from Aqueduct Press, and the anthology Million Writers Award: The Best Online Science Fiction and Fantasy.
