= The Killing Moon (novel) =

Fantasy novel

- Author: N. K. Jemisin
- Language: English
- Series: The Dreamblood Duology
- Release number: 1
- Genre: Fantasy
- Publisher: Orbit
- Publication date: May 1, 2012
- Media type: Print (Paperback & Hardcover)
- Followed by: The Shadowed Sun

The Killing Moon is a fantasy novel by N. K. Jemisin, the first novel in the Dreamblood Duology. It was followed by The Shadowed Sun. Released on May 1, 2012 by Orbit Books, The Killing Moon centers on a series of murders and a potential magic war.

== Synopsis ==
=== Premise ===
In the city of Gujaareh, power is divided between the secular Prince and the religious Hetawa temple. The Hetawa practices dream-based magic called narcomancy in service to the goddess Hananja. The Hetawa is divided into four orders: Teachers, Sentinels (warriors), Sharers (healers), and Gatherers (psychopomps). The Gatherers are a select group of priests with the ability to enter dreams and harvest dreamblood. They are tasked with bringing peaceful death to those who are terminally ill or those who are judged to be corrupt by the Hetawa.

Dreamblood is used in powerful healing magic but is also potent and addictive. A Gatherer may become addicted to dreamblood and lose his connection to reality. Such a Gatherer becomes a Reaper. Reapers destroys souls instead of transferring them to the afterlife.

Years before the start of the novel, Prince Eninket assumes control of the throne by killing his father and most of his siblings. The only survivor is his younger brother Ehiru, who had already joined the Hetawa and who was not seen as a rival for the throne.

=== Plot ===
In Gujaareh, Gatherer Ehiru attempts to collect the soul of a foreign visitor, but experiences a moment of hesitation. The man dies and his soul is destroyed. Ehiru begins to suffer a crisis of faith.

Ambassador Sunandi comes from Kisua, a nation where narcomancy is outlawed. She learns that Prince Eninket is building ships of war to attack Kisua. Additionally, a Reaper is in the city, and the Hetawa is covering it up.

Acolyte Nijiri becomes Ehiru’s apprentice. Nijiri is expected to replace the recently deceased Gatherer Una-une. Ehiru is tasked with Gathering Sunandi’s soul. When the Gatherers confront her, she reveals her information regarding the corruption of Prince Eninket and the Hetawa. Ehiru realizes that the Hetawa’s sacred mission has been compromised and that Gatherers have been used to eliminate political enemies rather than guilty citizens; he decides to join forces with Sunandi and investigate the corruption.

Sunandi, Ehiru, and Nijiri journey to Kisua. Ehiru begins to hallucinate due to lack of dreamblood. They are pursued and attacked by the Prince’s soldiers. In his growing madness, Ehiru destroys a soldier’s soul, becoming a Reaper. Sunandi brings Ehiru and Nijiri before the leaders of Kisua, where they share information about the Prince’s plans for war. Ehiru and Nijiri return to Gujaareh.

The two Gatherers are captured and brought to a dungeon. Prince Eninket reveals that the Reaper is the supposedly deceased Una-une. Eninket plans to use a Reaper to gather the dreamblood of every soldier on the battlefield, transferring the substance to himself and becoming functionally immortal.

Nijiri kills Una-une. Nijiri distracts Eninket, allowing Ehiru to regain control of himself. Ehiru kills the Prince. Nijiri Gathers Ehiru’s soul and sends him peacefully into the afterlife.

In an epilogue, the Kisuati army has defeated Gujaareh and occupied the city. Sunandi and Nijiri discuss the future of the city.

== Reception and awards ==
Reviews for the book were predominantly positive.

Writing for Slant Magazine. Das Indrapramit called the novel "refreshingly unique, evoking none of the generic medievalism of much Euro-centric fiction that dominates the fantasy market." Indrapramit praised the narrative, the worldbuilding, and the characterization, particularly noting that that "relationship between Ehiru and Nijiri is as complex and rewarding a portrayal of mentor and apprentice as I've seen in a while." A review in NPR stated that The Killing Moon "mixes ancient Egyptian magic and Jungian theory" and that the reader "won't regret" spending time with the novel.

io9 praised the book's themes of "religion, gods and magic." Kirkus Reviews wrote that the book was "fulfilling" but remarked that at points the book was "claustrophobic" and that it lacked maps.

Year	Award	Result	Ref
2012	Nebula Award for Best Novel	Finalist	
2013	Locus Award for Best Fantasy Novel	Finalist	
2013	World Fantasy Award for Best Novel	Finalist	
