= Mac Walters =

Video game developer

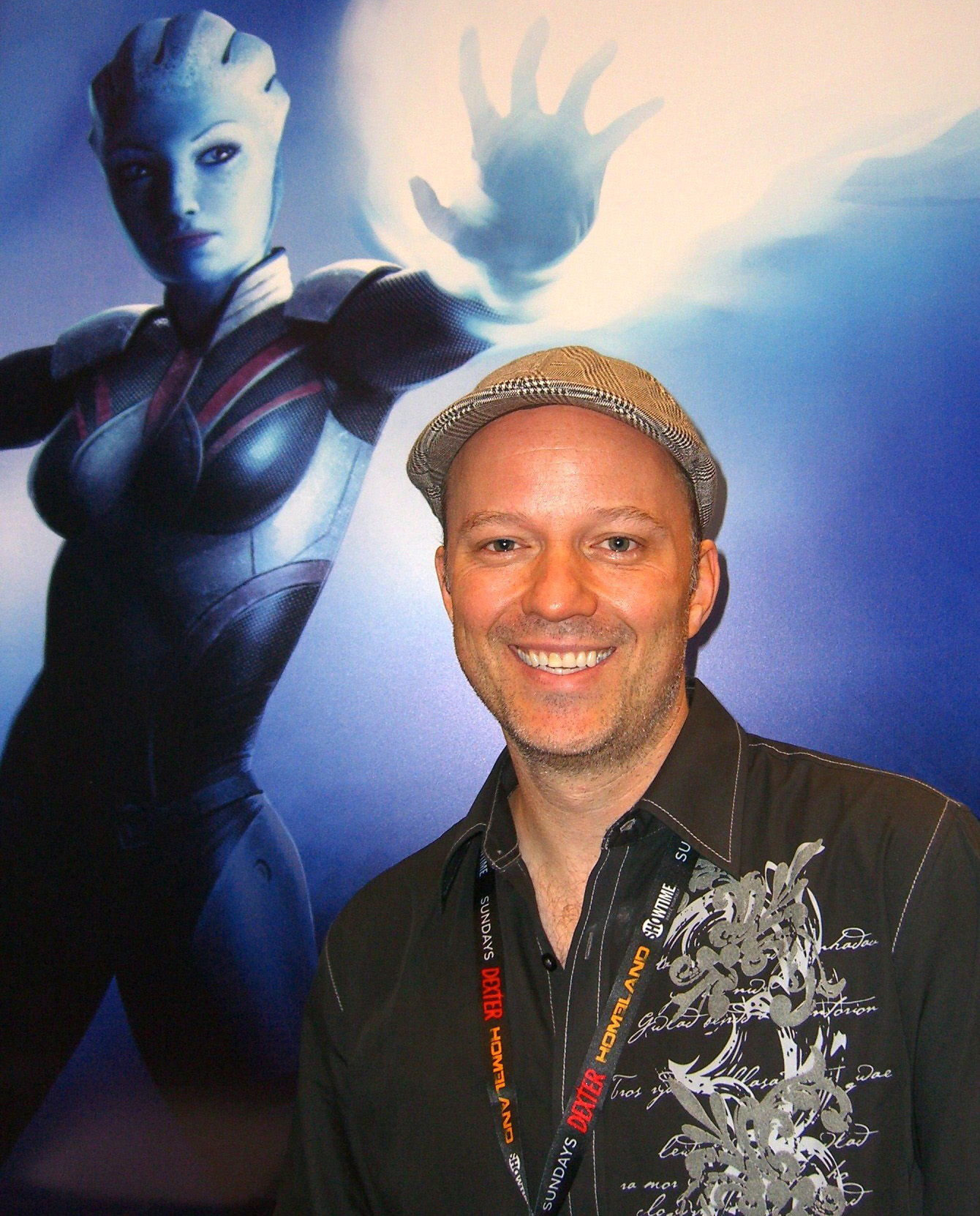
- Walters in 2011
- Occupations: Video game writer, director
- Years active: 2003–present
- Notable work: Mass Effect
- Title: Founder and studio head at Worlds Untold

Mac Walters is a video game developer best known for his work at BioWare as a writer on the Mass Effect series.

== Career ==
Walters joined BioWare in 2003 as a writer on Jade Empire. He followed this with a senior writer on the first Mass Effect game, before becoming lead writer on the second and third entry in the series. As the writing team worked on the story, Walters encouraged the team to focus more on characters, to get players invested in the events of the game. Around the time of the second Mass Effect game, Walters also wrote the story for a spin-off comic called Mass Effect: Redemption. In 2013, Walters was also nominated for a BAFTA award for his writing on Mass Effect 3.

He briefly served as narrative director on Anthem, before returning to the Mass Effect universe as creative director on Mass Effect: Andromeda. As they began work on Andromeda, Walters encouraged the team to return to a creative place where "anything is possible", rather than simply making Mass Effect 4. During this time, Walters also penned a novel to bridge the narrative events of the Mass Effect trilogy and Andromeda. The planned fourth novel was effectively canceled, as Walters' duties as creative director of Andromeda eventually took precedence, and development has stalled for the Mass Effect film. After the release of Andromeda, Walters became project director for Mass Effect Legendary Edition.

Walters became the production director on Dragon Age: Dreadwolf. In 2023, he announced he was leaving BioWare after 19 years with the company. Walters established Worlds Untold, which was acquired by NetEase in November 2023. However, NetEase withdrew its funding from Worlds Untold, resulting in the studio "pausing" its operations the next year.

== Video games ==
Year	Title	Notes
2005	Jade Empire	Writer
2007	Mass Effect	Writer
2010	Mass Effect 2	Lead writer
2012	Mass Effect 3	Lead writer
2017	Mass Effect: Andromeda	Creative director
2019	Anthem	Narrative director
2021	Mass Effect: Legendary Edition	Project director
