= N. K. Jemisin =

American science fiction and fantasy writer (born 1972)

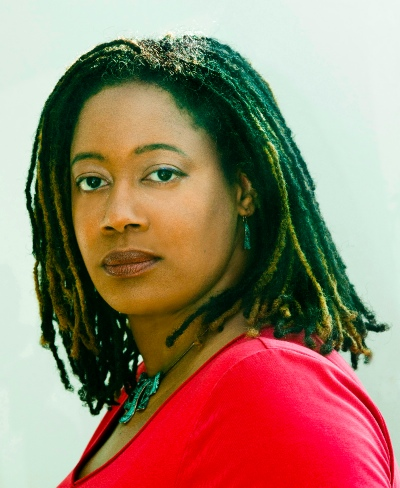
- Jemisin in 2015
- Born: Nora Keita Jemisin; September 19, 1972 (age 54); Iowa City, Iowa, U.S.
- Education: Tulane University (BS); University of Maryland, College Park (MEd)
- Occupations: Novelist; mental health and career counselor
- Writing career
- Language: English
- Genres: Science fiction; fantasy
- Notable works: Broken Earth series; Emergency Skin; Far Sector
- Notable awards: MacArthur Fellow; Hugo Award
- Website: nkjemisin.com

Nora Keita Jemisin (born September 19, 1972) is an American science fiction and fantasy writer. Her fiction includes a wide range of themes, notably cultural conflict and oppression. Her debut novel, The Hundred Thousand Kingdoms (2010), and the subsequent books in her Inheritance Trilogy received critical acclaim.

Jemisin has won several awards for her work, including multiple Locus Awards, starting with her first novel. Her Broken Earth series made her the first African-American author to win the Hugo Award for Best Novel, as well as the first author to win in three consecutive years, and the first to win for all three novels in a trilogy. She won a fourth Hugo in 2020 for the novelette Emergency Skin and a fifth in 2022 for the comic book series Far Sector. Jemisin was a recipient of the MacArthur Fellows Program prize in 2020.

In 2025, the Science Fiction and Fantasy Writers Association named Jemisin the 42nd Damon Knight Memorial Grand Master in recognition of her significant contributions to the literature of science fiction and fantasy.

== Early life ==
Jemisin was born in Iowa City, Iowa, while her parents Noah Jemisin and Janice Jemisin were completing masters programs at the University of Iowa. She grew up in New York City and Mobile, Alabama. Jemisin attended Tulane University from 1990 to 1994, where she received a B.S. in psychology. She went on to study counseling and earn her Master of Education from the University of Maryland. She lived in Massachusetts for ten years and then moved to New York City. She worked as a mental health and career counselor before writing full-time.

== Career ==
A graduate of the 2002 Viable Paradise writing workshop, Jemisin has published short stories and novels. She was a member of the Boston-area writing group BRAWLers, and as of 2010 was a member of Altered Fluid, a speculative fiction critique group. In 2009 and 2010, Jemisin's short story "Non-Zero Probabilities" was a finalist for the Nebula and Hugo Best Short Story Awards.

Jemisin's debut novel, The Hundred Thousand Kingdoms, the first volume in her Inheritance Trilogy, was published in 2010. It was a finalist for the 2010 Nebula Award and shortlisted for the James Tiptree Jr. Award (now called the Otherwise Award). In 2011, it was a finalist for the Hugo Award, World Fantasy Award, and Locus Award for Best First Novel, winning the latter. It was followed by two further novels in the same trilogy – The Broken Kingdoms (2010) and The Kingdom of Gods (2011).

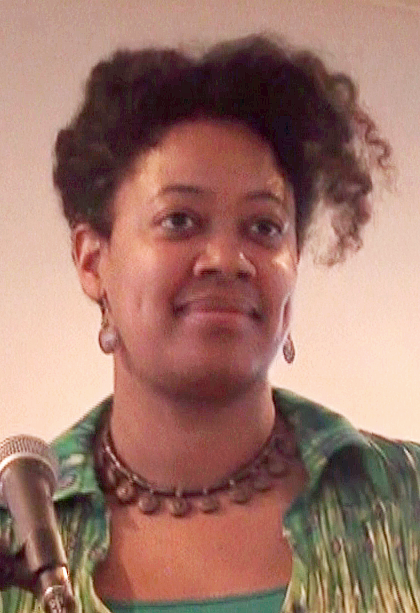
NK Jemisin in 2011

During her delivery of the Guest of Honour speech at the 2013 Continuum in Australia, Jemisin pointed out that 10% of the Science Fiction and Fantasy Writers of America (SFWA) membership voted for alt-right writer Theodore Beale, known as Vox Day, in his bid for the SFWA presidential position, stating that silence about Beale's views was the same as enabling them. Canadian writer Amal El-Mohtar characterized Beale's response to Jemisin as "an appallingly racist screed". A link to his comments was tweeted on the SFWA Authors Twitter feed, and Beale was subsequently expelled from the organization after a unanimous vote by the SFWA Board.

Jemisin was a co-Guest of Honor of the 2014 WisCon science fiction convention in Madison, Wisconsin. At that time, GQ described her as having "a day job as a counseling psychologist." She was the Author Guest of Honor at Arisia 2015 in Boston, Massachusetts. In January 2016, Jemisin started writing "Otherworldly", a bimonthly column for The New York Times. In May 2016, Jemisin mounted a Patreon campaign which raised sufficient funding to allow her to quit her job as a counselor and focus full-time on her writing.

=== Broken Earth ===
Jemisin's novel The Fifth Season was published in 2015, the first of the Broken Earth trilogy. The novel was inspired in part from a dream Jemisin had and the protests in Ferguson, Missouri about the death of Michael Brown. The Fifth Season won the Hugo Award for Best Novel, making Jemisin the first African-American writer to win a Hugo award in that category. The sequels in the trilogy, The Obelisk Gate and The Stone Sky, won the Hugo Award for Best Novel in 2017 and 2018, respectively, making Jemisin the first author to win the Hugo Award for Best Novel in three consecutive years, as well as the first to win for all three novels in a trilogy. In 2017, Bustle called Jemisin "the sci-fi writer every woman needs to be reading".

With Mac Walters, Jemisin co-authored the 2017 book Mass Effect: Andromeda Initiation, the second in a book series based on the video game Mass Effect: Andromeda. Jemisin published a short story collection, How Long 'til Black Future Month? in November 2018. It contains stories written from 2004 to 2017 and four new works. Far Sector, a twelve-issue limited series comic written by Jemisin with art by Jamal Campbell, began publication in 2019. It was nominated for the 2021 Eisner Award for Best Limited Series.

Jemisin's urban fantasy novel The City We Became was published in March 2020. In October 2020, Jemisin was announced as a recipient of the MacArthur Fellows Program Genius Grant. In June 2021, Sony's TriStar Pictures won the rights to adapt The Broken Earth trilogy in a seven-figure deal with Jemisin adapting the novels for the screen herself. In 2021, she was included in the Time 100, Time's annual list of the 100 most influential people in the world. The World We Make, a sequel to Jemisin's 2020 novel, was released in November 2022.

== Personal life ==
Jemisin lives and works in Brooklyn, New York. She is first cousin once removed to stand-up comic and television host W. Kamau Bell.

== Awards and honors ==
In 2026 she was inducted into the New York State Writers Hall of Fame.

=== Novels ===
| Year | Title | Award | Category | Result | Ref |
|---|---|---|---|---|---|
| 2010 | The Broken Kingdoms | Romantic Times Reviewers' Choice Award | Fantasy Novel | Won | |
| 2010 | The Hundred Thousand Kingdoms | Nebula Award | Novel | Nominated | |
| 2010 | The Hundred Thousand Kingdoms | Otherwise Award | — | Honor List | |
| 2010 | The Hundred Thousand Kingdoms | Romantic Times Reviewers' Choice Award | Epic Fantasy Novel | Finalist | |
| 2011 | The Hundred Thousand Kingdoms | Crawford Award | — | Shortlisted | |
| 2011 | The Hundred Thousand Kingdoms | David Gemmell Awards for Fantasy | Fantasy Newcomer | Finalist | |
| 2011 | The Hundred Thousand Kingdoms | Hugo Award | Novel | Finalist | |
| 2011 | The Hundred Thousand Kingdoms | Locus Award | First Novel | Won | |
| 2011 | The Hundred Thousand Kingdoms | Sense of Gender Award | Translation | Won | |
| 2011 | The Hundred Thousand Kingdoms | World Fantasy Award | Novel | Nominated | |
| 2011 | The Kingdom of Gods | Nebula Award | Novel | Nominated | |
| 2012 | The Kingdom of Gods | Locus Award | Fantasy Novel | Finalist–6th | |
| 2012 | The Shadowed Sun | Romantic Times Reviewers' Choice Award | Fantasy Novel | Won | |
| 2012 | The Killing Moon | Nebula Award | Novel | Nominated | |
| 2013 | The Killing Moon | Locus Award | Fantasy Novel | Finalist–4th | |
| 2013 | The Killing Moon | World Fantasy Award | Novel | Nominated | |
| 2015 | The Fifth Season | Nebula Award | Novel | Nominated | |
| 2016 | The Fifth Season | Hugo Award | Novel | Won | |
| 2016 | The Fifth Season | Dragon Awards | Apocalyptic Novel | Nominated | |
| 2016 | The Fifth Season | Dragon Awards | Fantasy Novel | Nominated | |
| 2016 | The Fifth Season | Locus Award | Fantasy Novel | Finalist–2nd | |
| 2016 | The Fifth Season | World Fantasy Award | Novel | Nominated | |
| 2016 | The Obelisk Gate | Nebula Award | Novel | Nominated | |
| 2017 | The Obelisk Gate | Hugo Award | Novel | Won | |
| 2017 | The Obelisk Gate | Dragon Awards | Apocalyptic Novel | Nominated | |
| 2017 | The Obelisk Gate | Locus Award | Fantasy Novel | Finalist - 2nd | |
| 2017 | The Obelisk Gate | World Fantasy Award | Novel | Nominated | |
| 2017 | The Stone Sky | Nebula Award | Novel | Won | |
| 2018 | The Stone Sky | Hugo Award | Novel | Won | |
| 2018 | The Stone Sky | Locus Award | Fantasy Novel | Won | |
| 2020 | The City We Became | BSFA Award | Novel | Won | |
| 2020 | The City We Became | Los Angeles Times Book Prize | Ray Bradbury Prize | Finalist | |
| 2020 | The City We Became | Nebula Award | Novel | Nominated | |
| 2021 | The City We Became | Locus Award | Fantasy Novel | Won | |
| 2021 | The City We Became | British Fantasy Award | Fantasy Novel | Shortlisted | |
| 2021 | The City We Became | Hugo Award | Novel | Finalist | |
| 2021 | The City We Became | Ignyte Award | Adult Novel | Finalist | |
| 2021 | The City We Became | Gotham Book Prize | Fiction | Finalist | |
| 2022 | The World We Make | Kirkus Reviews Best Science Fiction and Fantasy of 2022 | — | Listed | |

Jemisin is the first author to win three successive Hugo Awards for Best Novel.

=== Short fiction ===
| Year | Title | Award | Category | Result | Ref. |
|---|---|---|---|---|---|
| 2006 | "Cloud Dragon Skies" | Parallax Award | — | Shortlisted | |
| 2009 | "Non-Zero Probabilities" | Nebula Award | Short Story | Nominated | |
| 2010 | "Non-Zero Probabilities" | Hugo Award | Short Story | Finalist | |
| 2017 | "The City Born Great" | Hugo Award | Short Story | Finalist | |
| 2019 | "How Long 'til Black Future Month?" | Alex Award | — | Won | |
| 2019 | "How Long 'til Black Future Month?" | Locus Award | Collection | Won | |
| 2019 | "How Long 'til Black Future Month?" | World Fantasy Award | Collection | Nominated | |
| 2020 | "Emergency Skin" | Hugo Award | Novelette | Won | |
| 2020 | "Emergency Skin" | Ignyte Award | Novelette | Won | |
| 2020 | "Emergency Skin" | Locus Award | Novelette | Finalist-2nd | |
| 2022 | "Far Sector" | Hugo Award | Graphic Story or Comic | Won | |

== Selected bibliography ==
=== Novels ===
==== Inheritance Trilogy ====
- The Hundred Thousand Kingdoms (2010)
- The Broken Kingdoms (2010)
- The Kingdom of Gods (2011)

A sequel novella entitled "The Awakened Kingdom" was released as part of an omnibus edition on December 9, 2014.

A triptych entitled Shades in Shadow was released on July 28, 2015. It contained three short stories, including a prequel to the trilogy: "The Wild Boy", "The God Without a Name", and "The Third Why".

==== Dreamblood Duology ====
- The Killing Moon (2012)
- The Shadowed Sun (2012)

==== Broken Earth series ====
- The Fifth Season (2015)
- The Obelisk Gate (2016)
- The Stone Sky (2017)

==== Mass Effect: Andromeda ====
- Mass Effect: Andromeda Initiation (with Mac Walters, 2017)

==== Great Cities Series ====
- The City We Became (2020)
- The World We Make (2022)

The short story "The City Born Great", released in 2016, is a precursor to the series and was adapted to serve as the prologue for The City We Became.

=== Short stories ===
- "L'Alchimista", published in Scattered, Covered, Smothered, Two Cranes Press, 2004. Honorable Mention in The Year's Best Fantasy and Horror, 18th collection. Also available as an Escape Pod episode.
- "Too Many Yesterdays, Not Enough Tomorrows", Ideomancer, 2004.
- "Cloud Dragon Skies", Strange Horizons, 2005. Also an Escape Pod episode
- "Red Riding-Hood's Child", Fishnet, 2005.
- "The You Train", Strange Horizons, 2007.
- "Bittersweet", Abyss & Apex Magazine, 2007.
- "The Narcomancer", Helix, reprinted in Transcriptase, 2007.
- "The Brides of Heaven", Helix, reprinted in Transcriptase, 2007.
- "Playing Nice With God's Bowling Ball", Baen's Universe, 2008.
- "The Dancer's War", published in Like Twin Stars: Bisexual Erotic Stories, Circlet Press, 2009.
- "Non-Zero Probabilities", Clarkesworld Magazine, 2009.
- "Sinners, Saints, Dragons, and Haints in the City Beneath the Still Waters", Postscripts, 2010.
- "On the Banks of the River Lex", Clarkesworld Magazine, 11/2010.
- "The Effluent Engine", published in Steam-Powered: Lesbian Steampunk Stories, Torquere Press, 2011.
- "The Trojan Girl", Weird Tales, 2011.
- "Valedictorian", published in After: Nineteen Stories of Apocalypse and Dystopia, Hyperion Book CH, 2012.
- "Walking Awake", Lightspeed, 2014.
- "Stone Hunger", Clarkesworld Magazine, 2014.
- "Sunshine Ninety-Nine", Popular Science, 2015.
- "The City Born Great", published as a Tor.com exclusive available for free online, 2016.
- "Red Dirt Witch", Fantasy Magazine: PoC Destroy Fantasy, 2016.
- "The Evaluators", Wired, 2016.
- "Henosis", Uncanny Magazine, 2017.
- "Give Me Cornbread or Give Me Death", A People's Future of the United States, 2017.
- "The Storyteller's Replacement", How Long til Black Future Month, 2018.
- "The Elevator Dancer", How Long til Black Future Month, 2018.
- "Cuisine des Mémoires", How Long til Black Future Month, 2018.
- "Emergency Skin", Amazon Original Stories:Forward, 2019.
- "The Ones Who Stay and Fight", How Long 'til Black Future Month?, 2018, reprinted in Lightspeed Magazine, 2020.
- "Reckless Eyeballing", published in Out There Screaming: An Anthology of New Black Horror, Random House, 2023.

=== Short story collections ===
- How Long 'til Black Future Month? (November 2018)

=== Nonfiction ===
- Geek Wisdom: The Sacred Teachings of Nerd Culture (co-written with Stephen H. Segal, Genevieve Valentine, Zaki Hasan, and Eric San Juan, 2011)

=== Comics ===
- Far Sector #1-12 (with Jamal Campbell, DC Comics, 2019) - nominated for the 2021 Eisner Award for Best Limited Series

== See also ==
- Afrofuturism – Cultural aesthetic and philosophy
- "I Sexually Identify as an Attack Helicopter" – 2020 short story by Isabel Fall
