= Mass Effect: Andromeda =

2017 video game

- Developer: BioWare
- Publisher: Electronic Arts
- Director: Mac Walters
- Producers: Fabrice Condominas; Mike Gamble; Fernando Melo
- Designer: Ian S. Frazier
- Programmers: Harold Chaput; Brian Rae; Julien Adriano
- Artist: Joel MacMillan
- Writers: John Dombrow; Cathleen Rootsaert; Chris Schlerf
- Composer: John Paesano
- Series: Mass Effect
- Engine: Frostbite 3
- Platforms: PlayStation 4; Windows; Xbox One
- Release: NA: March 21, 2017; PAL: March 23, 2017
- Genre: Action role-playing
- Modes: Single-player, multiplayer

Mass Effect: Andromeda is a 2017 action role-playing game developed by BioWare and published by Electronic Arts. It is the fourth and final major entry in the Mass Effect series and was released in March 2017 for PlayStation 4, Windows, and Xbox One. The game is set within the Andromeda Galaxy during the 29th century, where humanity is planning to populate new home worlds as part of a strategy called the Andromeda Initiative. The player assumes the role of either Scott or Sara Ryder, an inexperienced military recruit who joins the Initiative and wakes up in Andromeda following a sleeper ship journey. Ryder becomes humanity's Pathfinder, who is tasked with finding a new home world for humanity while also dealing with an antagonistic alien species known as the Kett, and uncovering the secrets of a mysterious synthetic intelligence species known as the Remnant.

For Mass Effect: Andromeda, BioWare incorporated a lighter tone than previous installments in the series, utilized open world elements, and placed an emphasis on exploration. Many of the series' traditional gameplay elements remain, while others are modified, such as combat, which is less cover-based and more mobile. The game is the largest in the series, and offers the player the freedom to focus on either the main quest or side quests. Its score was composed by John Paesano and aims to match the game's mood by capturing the adventure of space exploration.

In contrast to the original Mass Effect trilogy, which was spearheaded by BioWare's Edmonton studio, Mass Effect: Andromeda was handled by a new team out of Montreal. The game experienced a troubled production cycle that saw many members of its leadership team depart mid-project and numerous changes in creative vision. It was built using Frostbite 3, which required that BioWare construct all systems, tools, and assets from scratch as the previous entries of the series were built using Unreal Engine 3. Following the game's release, BioWare released several patches in response to critical feedback, but decided not to release further single-player downloadable content additions.

Mass Effect: Andromeda was announced in June 2015. Upon release, it received average reviews from critics, who praised the game's improved combat, atmosphere and visuals, while criticizing its story, voice acting and technical issues. Following the game's disappointing commercial and critical reception, BioWare Montreal was merged into EA's Motive Studio and the Mass Effect franchise was temporarily put on hold. This was the final Mass Effect game released before BioWare's shutdown in 2026.

== Gameplay ==
Mass Effect: Andromeda is an action role-playing game in which the player takes control of either Sara or Scott Ryder from a third-person perspective. Both Ryders' appearances and first names can be determined by the player. The appearance of their father, Alec, is automatically adjusted based on the appearance of the Ryder twins. Upon beating the game, a New Game+ is unlocked, which allows the player to restart the game with certain bonuses and switch to playing as the other Ryder. The player can also choose to continue playing with their existing character and complete unfinished missions.

Unlike previous installments in the Mass Effect series, where the player begins each new game by choosing from six different character classes that each have their own unique set of skills, the player instead has free rein to assign any skills they want and build towards a specialty over the course of the game. For example, if the player chooses to invest solely in biotic skills, Ryder will unlock the Adept profile, which results in bonuses related to that playstyle. Experience points are earned by completing missions, and there is no cap on the number of points that can be earned. Once enough points are gained, Ryder levels up, which allows for the unlocking and upgrading of skills along a tree. Points assigned to each skill can be constantly reallocated so that the player can experiment with multiple gameplay approaches without having to restart their game and build up their skills from scratch again.

Similar to its predecessors, the player can interact with characters in Mass Effect: Andromeda using a radial command menu where the dialogue options depend on wheel direction. Around the wheel are four types of responses that shape each conversation: emotional, logical, professional, and casual. In general, conversations are based on agreeing or disagreeing with participants. During some conversations, the player is prompted with an "Impulse Action" that offers an additional choice to what is available on the dialogue wheel. For example, an on-screen prompt to "shoot" might appear and be momentarily selectable. By conversing with non-player characters, Ryder can develop friendships and, in some cases, romantic relationships with them over time. During both dialogue and quest sequences, the player is sometimes tasked with making moral decisions that do not have a clear good/bad distinction, but are intended to be more nuanced, marking a departure from the Paragon/Renegade morality system of prior titles in the series.

=== Navigation and exploration ===
In Mass Effect: Andromeda, the player explores the Heleus cluster of the Andromeda Galaxy by selecting destinations from the inside of a ship called Tempest. By having Ryder stand on the ship's bridge, the player is able to overlook the stars using a galaxy map and choose a navigation point. The game features five primary planets and over a dozen hub worlds that connect the player to various quests which can be completed, such as taking out hostile enemy bases or hideouts, scanning for objects with useful data, or finishing loyalty missions for Ryder's squadmates. As quests are completed, the player earns "Andromeda Viability Points", which allow for the waking of colonists from hibernation, and planets increase their "Viability Levels", which allow for the building of outposts. Each planet has a boss that the player may not be able to defeat at first and might need to revisit later once Ryder has sufficiently leveled up.

The game's primary planets have open world environments and can be traversed using the "Nomad", a six-wheeled, all-terrain vehicle. While driving the Nomad, the player has the ability to scan the planet's terrain for resources and then deploy mining drones to collect them. As new areas are explored, the player can find drop zones that serve as fast-travel points and allow for a loadout change. To aid the player in managing quests, the game automatically logs available missions in a journal where the player can select a single quest to make active, which is then marked on the game's user interface. Some planets have environmental hazards that must be accounted for, such as the planet Elaaden, where Ryder must avoid the heat to prevent taking damage. Over the course of the game, the player can find blueprints and resources that are used for crafting weapons and armor. All crafted items can be given customized names.

One way that the player can move around the world is by jumping into the air using a jetpack. A compass helps the player navigate around the map. Health bars and skill buttons at the bottom of the screen are used during combat.

=== Combat ===
Combat in Mass Effect: Andromeda takes place in real-time, and unlike previous installments in the series, pausing the game to aim or use skills from a menu is no longer a feature. During action sequences, the player has direct control of Ryder from an over-the-shoulder perspective, who can move around the battlefield in a variety of ways, including a side-to-side dash or vertical leap into the air using a jetpack. When the player approaches an object, Ryder will automatically take cover, providing protection in battle. The game encourages the player to keep moving during combat with large, open battlefields and enemies that attack from all angles, but also allows for both aggressive and defensive tactics.

Damage is dealt to enemies using gunfire, melee attacks, or specialized skills such as a flamethrower. At all times, three skills are available for use, along with a profile that provides playstyle bonuses. The player can rotate between up to four combinations of skills and profiles by setting up "favorite slots", which can be accessed during battle. For example, one slot might have three biotic skills and the Adept profile while another has three combat skills and the Soldier profile. A single skill cannot be deployed continuously, meaning that after a skill is used, there is a cool down phase during which the skill is disabled, but other skills can be used. Some weapons have a finite magazine and requires the player to replenish ammunition after a certain number of shots. Other weapons operate on an overheating system where the player must wait for the weapon to cool down after a certain number of shots.

=== Multiplayer ===
In addition to its single-player content, Mass Effect: Andromeda also contains a multiplayer mode. The mode revolves around horde-style cooperative matches in which the player must survive escalating waves of enemies and complete a series of objectives. Before heading into battle, the player can select a character, allocate skill points, and manage weapons. Unlike in the single-player mode, where the player is limited to playing as a human, the multiplayer mode offers a wider variety of species to choose from. At the conclusion of a match, all players earn experience points and credits; the former is used for further character upgrades and the latter is used to buy unlockables. The plot of the single-player campaign is not affected by the multiplayer mode.

== Synopsis ==
=== Setting and characters ===
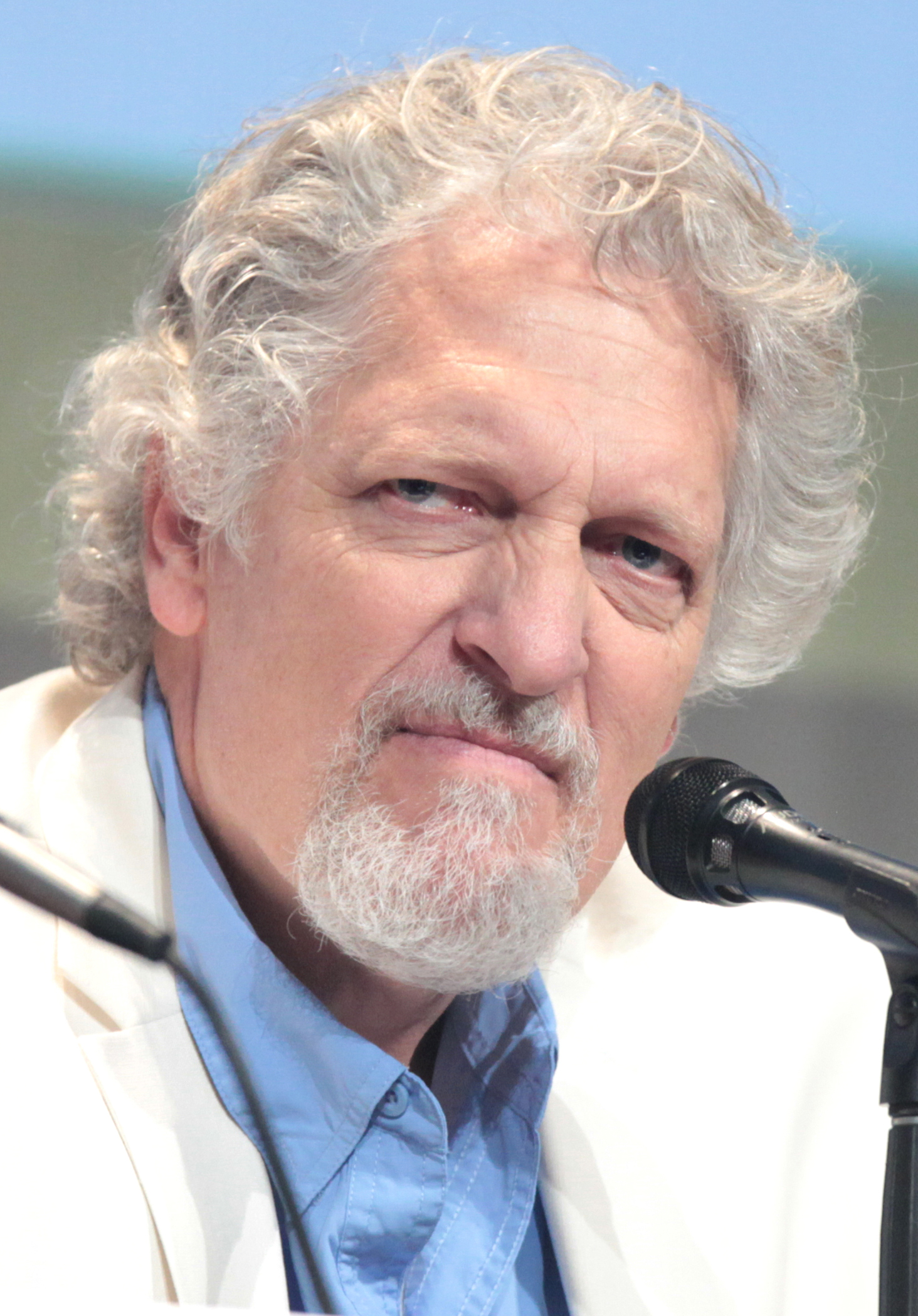
Clancy Brown voiced Alec Ryder.

Mass Effect: Andromeda begins in 2185, between the events of Mass Effect 2 and Mass Effect 3. The four Citadel Council races and the quarians are planning to populate new home worlds in the Andromeda Galaxy as part of a strategy called the Andromeda Initiative. Each race sends 20,000 citizens on a one-way, 600-year journey to Heleus Cluster located in Andromeda aboard their own sleeper ship, called an Ark, and selects a leader, known as a Pathfinder. Once the races arrive at their destination in 2819, they help build the Nexus, a space station that serves as a center of government and diplomacy, a living area, and a base of operations for the Pathfinders. Characters and player decisions from the original Mass Effect trilogy are not carried over into Mass Effect: Andromeda, and there is no canon ending which is referenced.

The protagonist of Mass Effect: Andromeda is, depending on player choice, either Sara or Scott Ryder (voiced by Fryda Wolff or Tom Taylorson, respectively). Their father, Alec Ryder (voiced by Clancy Brown), is humanity's Pathfinder, tasked with finding a new home for the species. Squadmates in the game include Alec's second-in-command, Cora Harper (Jules de Jongh), a biotic specialist with intensive commando training; Liam Kosta (Gary Carr), a security expert who specializes in crisis response; Pelessaria "Peebee" B'Sayle (Christine Lakin), an asari gunslinger capable of biotic destabilization; Nakmor Drack (Stanley Townsend), a veteran krogan warrior of the Nakmor clan specializing in close combat; Vetra Nyx (Danielle Rayne), a female turian mercenary who excels in shielding and protection; and Jaal Ama Darav (Nyasha Hatendi), a resistance fighter of the newly introduced angara race. Ryder's crewmates include Kallo Jath (Garett Ross), a salarian pilot; Lexi T'Perro (Natalie Dormer), an asari medical doctor; Suvi Anwar (Katy Townsend), a human science officer; Gil Brodie (Gethin Anthony), a human mechanic; and SAM (Alexia Traverse-Healy), an artificial intelligence that can communicate with all members of the team via implants.

=== Plot ===
In 2819, following a 634-year journey aboard the Ark Hyperion, Ryder awakens in the Heleus Cluster of the Andromeda Galaxy. Hyperion strikes a dark energy cloud called the Scourge, temporarily knocking out its power and sending Ryder's sibling into a coma. Pathfinder Alec Ryder, Ryder's father, informs Ryder and Cora Harper that the planet they were sent to scout may no longer be viable for colonization. Alec, Ryder, Cora, and Liam Kosta head down to the planet, coming into contact with a hostile alien race, the kett, as well as strange structures from a synthetic alien race, the Remnant. Ryder and Alec find a terminal inside an alien monolith, which Alec activates in an attempt to stabilize the lightning storm-stricken planet. A large blast throws the two off the elevated platform, damaging Ryder's helmet and exposing Ryder to the toxic atmosphere. Alec saves Ryder by giving Ryder his helmet, sacrificing his own life. Ryder is later revived and merged with the artificial intelligence SAM, learning that Alec has made Ryder the new Pathfinder.

Hyperion reaches the Nexus, finding it incomplete and with no other Ark in sight. The crew learn from Nexus leadership that all of the worlds in Andromeda have become inhospitable, and that the Initiative has been stranded upon arrival, suffering from civil unrest and a supply shortage. As humanity's new Pathfinder, Ryder is tasked with finding a suitable world to colonize, as well as uncovering the fates of the other Arks. Ryder is also assigned a spaceship, the Tempest, piloted by Kallo Jath and accompanied by Vetra Nyx.

Ryder's first stop on the search is Eos, a desert planet plagued by radiation, where Nakmor Drack and Peebee join the crew. With SAM's help, Ryder unlocks a Remnant vault, which houses a terraforming system that rapidly repairs the planet's ecosystem to more hospitable levels. The planet's newly-improved viability allows Ryder to establish Andromeda's first successful outpost. Ryder also discovers a star chart pinpointing the location of other worlds that might hold similar structures. It is deduced that these worlds could sustain the Initiative.

On the way to another system, the Tempest runs into the kett fleet, and is forced to escape through the Scourge, suffering significant damage. The ship lands on the planet Aya, coming into contact with a new alien species, the angara, who are mounting a resistance against the kett. Ryder proves the Initiative's good intentions by aiding the angara on two other planets, in addition to recruiting a member of their species, Jaal Ama Darav, to the Tempest's crew. Ryder also rescues high-ranking angara Moshae Sjefa from a kett facility, discovering in the process that the kett have been turning the angara into more kett through a genetic modification process known as "exaltation". The Moshae takes Ryder to Aya's vault, learning that the kett leader, the Archon, is chasing an object called Meridian, which can control all vaults and, by extension, the worlds that they are connected to. Ryder, anxious to stop the kett, tracks down their flagship and discovers that the kett have captured the Salarian Ark and have been experimenting with various Initiative species. Ryder frees the ark and learns the location of Meridian.

Ryder then proceeds to the presumed location of Meridian, which is revealed to be an ancient Remnant city. Ryder discovers that Meridian, a Dyson sphere-like construct, was taken away from the city, disconnecting the vaults and rendering the planets uninhabitable. The Archon launches an attack on Hyperion, severing SAM from Ryder, while also capturing Ryder's sibling, whose SAM implant he intends to use in order to take over Meridian. Ryder manages to activate the Remnant fleet and, together with other allied forces, makes an assault on the kett fleet guarding Meridian. The Ryder twins work to defeat the kett, eventually disconnecting the Archon from Meridian's system and killing him in the process. Ryder is hailed as a hero, having activated Meridian and made the cluster more suitable for settlement. Hyperion, after crash-landing onto Meridian, settles on the planet as humanity's new home.

In a post-credit scene, the Archon's second-in command, Primus, is seen observing Meridian, hinting at a possible future threat.

== Development ==
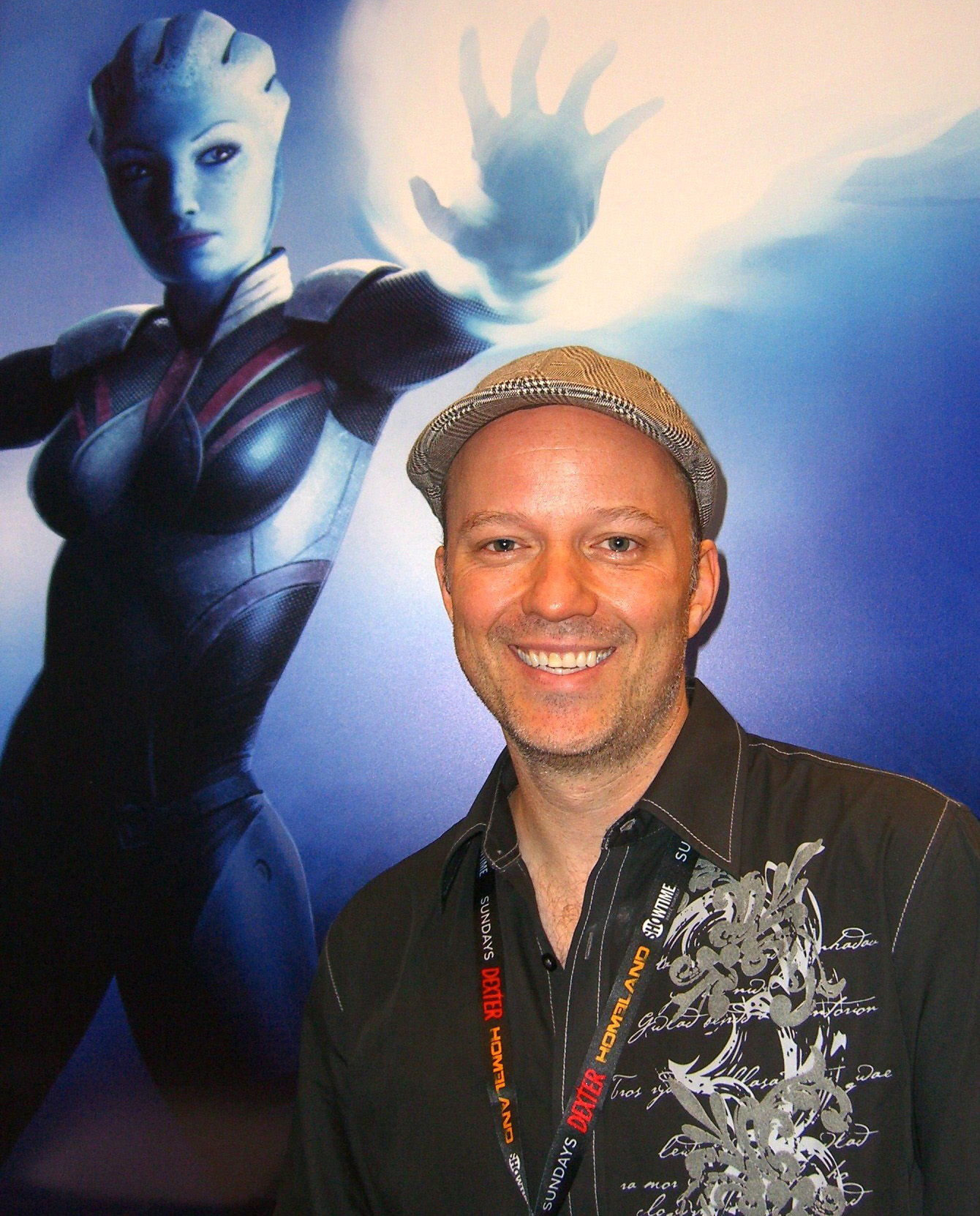
Mac Walters served as creative director for Mass Effect: Andromeda, taking over for Gérard Lehiany in 2014.

Mass Effect: Andromeda was developed by BioWare, the same company that developed the original Mass Effect trilogy, and published by Electronic Arts (EA), who published the second and third games in the original trilogy. In contrast to the original trilogy, which was spearheaded by BioWare's Edmonton studio, Mass Effect: Andromeda was handled by a new team out of Montreal. This was done so that Edmonton could focus on a new intellectual property (IP), later revealed to be Anthem. The company's Austin team assisted in development as well. BioWare's general manager, Aaryn Flynn, noted that many of the developers working on the project were fans of the original trilogy who came to BioWare specifically to work on a Mass Effect game.

=== Game design ===
Early stages of development on Mass Effect: Andromeda began in 2012, following the release of Mass Effect 3. One of the first decisions that BioWare made was not to include Commander Shepard, the series' original protagonist, in the game. This strategy allowed them to make changes to some of the series' traditional gameplay elements, such as the old Paragon/Renegade morality system, which they felt was tied to Shepard and would not make sense without the character. They originally considered developing a prequel, but decided against it after soliciting feedback from fans, focus groups, and the development team. Instead of preparing for another trilogy, the company tried to avoid locking themselves into a specific plan with regards to future installments in the franchise, which they felt gave them more creative freedom.

Although BioWare approached Mass Effect: Andromeda as a new beginning and wanted it to feel fresh and new, the company still borrowed elements from previous titles. For example, the ability to drive a vehicle was inspired by the Mako from Mass Effect and the concept of loyalty missions was taken directly from Mass Effect 2. The team also applied lessons that they learned from Mass Effect 3, which featured a controversial ending where some fans didn't feel as though their investment in the series' characters had paid off.

For Mass Effect: Andromeda, BioWare decided to include open world elements and place an emphasis on exploration. As a result, they also decided to lighten the game's tone compared to previous installments in the series so that players could do side quests without feeling as though they were "letting the universe burn". Producer Mike Gamble felt the game was BioWare's biggest yet in terms of content, but also noted that the company made an effort to make every planet and area memorable. To avoid the trap of making the player do side quests that felt tedious and insignificant–which was a common criticism of their previous title, Dragon Age: Inquisition–the company paid attention to what other games in the industry were doing, such as CD Projekt Red's The Witcher 3: Wild Hunt. As late as 2014, BioWare planned to create hundreds of explorable planets by using procedural generation, but ultimately scrapped the idea because of the difficulty involved in implementing it as well as a lack of internal resources. Due in part to the decision to abandon this concept so late in development, the company found themselves behind schedule, and ended up building most of the game during the ensuing 18 months.

The team proposed between five and ten native Andromedan species, but a combination of budget constraints, the presence of many species from prior games, and BioWare opting for "cosplay-safe" species resulted in most of them being cut. The latter consideration led to the remaining species having more humanoid designs rather than the "jellyfish"-like ones some species in the other games had. The final game only had three native species: the Angara, the Kett, and the Remnant.

=== Production ===
Mass Effect: Andromeda required a team of over 200 developers and, as reported by the Edmonton Journal, was given a total budget of C$100 million, which included marketing and research costs. The game was initially directed by Gérard Lehiany, who was previously best known for his involvement in Beenox's Spider-Man games. Casey Hudson, who directed the original trilogy, was promoted to the role of executive producer before leaving BioWare in 2014. That same year, Lehiany also departed from the project; he was replaced by Mac Walters, who previously served as lead writer for the series. In general, the game's development was plagued by internal instability, with its lead writer, senior editor, and other members of its leadership team all departing from BioWare during production.

Mass Effect: Andromeda was built using EA DICE's Frostbite 3 engine, which required that BioWare construct all systems, tools, and assets from scratch as the series was previously built on Epic Games' Unreal Engine. Going into development, the company knew that the transition to Frostbite would be a difficult one, having already made the switch for Dragon Age: Inquisition, which proved to be extremely challenging as the engine was not designed with role-playing games in mind. In an effort to optimize the engine's capabilities, BioWare sometimes enlisted the help of other Frostbite developers. For example, to ensure that the game's driving mechanics handled well, BioWare invited the Need for Speed team to come onsite and offer advice and guidance. BioWare tried to push the boundaries of the software, specifically in the area of character animation, but struggled with facial animations in particular. This was due in part to difficulties with various animation programs, an understaffed development team, and a delayed production cycle.

As part of the move to Frostbite, BioWare decided to unite the combat systems of the single and multiplayer modes. In Mass Effect 3, the single-player mode used a system tailored to a slower, cover shooter approach while the multiplayer mode used a system tailored to a faster-paced approach. It was important to BioWare that, for all gameplay modes in Mass Effect: Andromeda, the player stay moving and have a strategy behind every action as opposed to remaining in one location for the entire duration of an encounter. To encourage players to play this way, BioWare built open combat layouts, which required the programming of complex artificial intelligence so that enemies could understand space and know how to flank the player from all angles.

=== Music ===
The original score of Mass Effect: Andromeda was composed by John Paesano, who was previously best known for his work on The Maze Runner films and Daredevil television series. Scenes in the game that take place in nightclubs or other public venues were composed by Edmonton-based DJs and producers. In general, the game's soundtrack was inspired by films such as Blade Runner and aimed to combine organic and synthetic sounds, an approach that BioWare used to "represent the triumph of space exploration and the fear of the unknown."

=== Patches ===
A week after Mass Effect: Andromeda's North American release, BioWare announced that they were planning on making improvements to the game in response to feedback from fans. In April, the company unveiled a patch that focused on bug fixes and improvements to the player experience, including better lip-syncing and faster movement around the galaxy map. The following month, another patch was released which focused on improvements to cinematic scenes. Further improvements were released through the month of July, before BioWare released a statement on August 19 which confirmed that there would be no further single-player downloadable content developed or released for the game, though multiplayer patches could continue.

== Marketing and release ==
Mass Effect: Andromeda was announced on June 15, 2015 at Electronic Entertainment Expo 2015. The game was marketed with a wide variety of video content, including teasers, (Note: E3 2015, N7 Day 2015.) gameplay reveals at various awards shows and conferences, (Note: 4K PS4 Pro, CES 2017, The Game Awards.) cinematic trailers, (Note: N7 Day 2016, January 2017, Launch Trailer.) and an instructional gameplay series. (Note: Combat, Exploration, Skills.) It was also promoted with a set of action figures by toy company Funko, which consisted of Peebee, Liam Kosta, Jaal, Sara Ryder, and Archon. One aspect of BioWare's marketing strategy was to avoid discussing certain plot points or making too many promises ahead of time, a plan which helped the company avoid disappointing players if they needed to cut content from the game.

Leading to the release of Mass Effect: Andromeda, BioWare set up a promotional website whereby players could participate in a mock training program for the Andromeda Initiative, which included listening to recruitment pitches, reading the history of the Mass Effect universe, or watching mission briefings. Briefings included an orientation video, an introduction to the Arks and Nexus, an overview of the Tempest and Nomad, and dossiers on the game's main crewmembers. As part of the program, BioWare also selected six fans to participate in an authentic astronaut training experience at the European Astronaut Centre. BioWare originally planned a beta that would allow players to help test the game's multiplayer mode prior to release, but it was eventually cancelled as the company felt it was ultimately unnecessary.

Mass Effect: Andromeda was originally scheduled for release in late 2016, but its official release date was eventually moved to March 21, 2017 in North America and March 23 in Europe, Australia and New Zealand. In addition to the standard version of the game, players could also purchase a Deluxe Edition and Super Deluxe Edition, which included in-game single and multiplayer bonuses, as well as a free soundtrack download. For a short time, players could also order two versions of a Collector's Edition, one of which included a model of the in-game vehicle, the Nomad, while the second version included a remote-control Nomad. However, both versions of the Collector's Edition did not include the game or any other in-game bonuses.

A week prior to Mass Effect: Andromeda's official release, BioWare made the first ten hours of the game available to players as part of EA Access and Origin Access. The game's facial animations immediately became a topic of controversy, with players posting clips, images, and memes online that poked fun at its character movements. One group of players took their complaints a step further; due to certain elements of their Twitter and Facebook bios that they subsequently removed, a former EA employee was incorrectly identified as a lead developer and was abused on Twitter. In response to the incident, BioWare released an official statement, saying, "We respect the opinions of our players and community ... But attacking individuals, regardless of their involvement in the project, is never acceptable."

== Reception ==
Reception

Aggregate score
Aggregator	Score
Metacritic	(PC) 72/100 (PS4) 71/100 (XONE) 76/100

Review scores
Publication	Score
Destructoid	6.5/10
Electronic Gaming Monthly	6/10
Game Informer	8/10
GameRevolution	3.5/5
GameSpot	6/10
GamesRadar+	3.5/5
IGN	7.7/10
PC Gamer (US)	80/100
Polygon	7.5/10
VideoGamer.com	7/10

Upon release, the PlayStation 4 and Windows versions of Mass Effect: Andromeda received "mixed or average" reviews while the Xbox One version received "generally favorable" reviews from video game publications, according to review aggregator platform Metacritic. The game was later ranked the 26th best of 2017 by Eurogamer. Conversely, it also received several dishonors, including Worst Game (That We Played) from Giant Bomb.

Mass Effect: Andromeda was not as well received as its predecessors. In his review for Forbes, Paul Tassi predicted that Mass Effect fans would enjoy the game, but prefer the original trilogy, outside of perhaps the original game. Many outlets described Mass Effect: Andromeda as a disappointment, including Giant Bomb and PlayStation LifeStyle, who retrospectively ranked it as the most disappointing game of 2017. Some critics also described the game as a missed opportunity, such as Joe Juba of Game Informer, who concluded, "Mass Effect: Andromeda is fun, and the important parts work ... At the same time, I was often left looking through a haze of inconveniences and dreaming about the game it could have been."

The combat in Mass Effect: Andromeda was one of the best-reviewed aspects of the game. IGN observed that it felt more energetic than previous titles in the series, although they criticized the automatic cover system and some of the user interface. In an otherwise mediocre review for GameSpot, Scott Butterworth relented that he enjoyed the combat shooting mechanics and appreciated how he was able to experiment with different character loadouts.

The plot of Mass Effect: Andromeda was met with a mixed reception. Destructoid described it as "dull" and observed that it took too long to establish an easily identifiable conflict. Andy Hartup of GamesRadar+ felt that the game lacked the nuance of previous installments and missed out on what made the original trilogy successful. IGN remarked that the plot was sometimes derivative of prior games in the series, using the Remnant as an example, which they felt was simply another "long-dead civilization that's left advanced technology lying around". By contrast, VideoGamer.com listed the plot as a positive, likening it to a Hollywood hero story. Reflecting on his experience with the game, Polygon's Arthur Gies opined that the story contained a number of worthwhile mysteries on the critical path and some "really interesting" optional content.

Numerous publications praised Mass Effect: Andromeda for its larger-scale visuals and an immersive atmosphere with a lot of exploration and content, such as PC Gamer, which wrote that the game looked "stunning" and the Frostbite engine rendered environments at a scale that previous Mass Effect games could not match. GameSpot remarked that the game's worlds were "breathtaking to behold and exciting to explore", but also noted there were too many repetitive, inconsequential quests which felt like "padding". RPGamer observed that the game's atmosphere was enhanced by its score, which they felt complemented the setting with either a "spacey background" or something more "rousing", as required. Trusted Reviews noted that the alien worlds were detailed and busier to make it significantly more atmospheric due to improved geometry complexity, higher resolution shadows, and better quality horizon-based ambient occlusion. Ruined Chapel also noted that the atmosphere had a sense of freedom, exploration and adventure, with a universe of countless stories and an epic feel, while IGN felt the energetic combat and fantastic sound effects contribute to a potent sci-fi atmosphere.

Many reviewers criticized Mass Effect: Andromeda for its technical issues. Writing for Electronic Gaming Monthly, Ray Carsillo described the game as "broken" and recalled instances where it came to a halt, particularly during driving sequences. Character facial animations were often referenced as part of the problem, with Game Revolution's Aron Garst reflecting, "Andromeda is full of bugs and technical oddities. From the freaky facial animations to the entire screen turning a lime shade of green for a few minutes, many things went wrong during my playthrough." In an otherwise positive review, Game Informer noted that technical glitches were plentiful, which hindered the game's playability. Some outlets felt that animation glitches, model issues, and poor graphical fidelity were most apparent during the game's cinematic romance scenes in particular.

=== Sales ===
Mass Effect: Andromeda was the third-best-selling game of March 2017. It led the United Kingdom in physical sales during its first two weeks of release. As of August, it was the seventh best-selling game of the year. However, it eventually dropped out of the year-end top ten. The game had the second-best physical launch in the series after Mass Effect 3. Andromeda's digital revenues only increased by mid-single-digit percentages against 2012's Mass Effect 3, despite substantial growth in digital sales since then. In addition, Andromeda on PC sold less than the 349,000 PC digital units Mass Effect 3 that sold in its launch month.

Prior to the release of Mass Effect: Andromeda, Chief Financial Officer (CFO) Blake Jorgensen projected that it would sell 3 million units before the end of March, and 6 to 9 million units during its lifetime. BioWare General Manager Aaryn Flynn predicted that it would sell at least 5 million copies worldwide. Wedbush Securities analyst Michael Pachter estimated that Mass Effect: Andromeda sold at least 2.5 million units in its opening quarter, resulting in $110 million in revenue. The closest that EA has come to noting an exact figure was in their fourth quarter (Q4) of fiscal year 2017 (FY17) notes for investors, which stated that $53 million of the game's net sales related to its special editions were to be captured in Q1 FY18 instead of Q4 FY17 (the quarter of its release) for accounting purposes.

During EA's Q3 FY18 earnings call on January 30, 2018, EA Chief Executive Officer (CEO) Andrew Wilson was asked a general question about the company's non-sports titles, which had performed below expectations. As part of his answer, Wilson noted, "...if you look at Mass Effect [Andromeda], while there was some polarizing sentiment in that franchise, it's actually performed really well, and player engagement is really strong."

=== Accolades ===
Year	Award	Category	Result	Ref.
2016	Golden Joystick Awards 2016	Most Wanted Game	Won	
2016	The Game Awards 2016	Most Anticipated Game	Nominated	
2017	Golden Joystick Awards 2017	Best Gaming Performance (Fryda Wolff)	Nominated	
2018	National Academy of Video Game Trade Reviewers Awards	Game, Franchise Role Playing	Nominated	
2018	National Academy of Video Game Trade Reviewers Awards	Sound Editing in a Game Cinema	Nominated	

== Cancelled sequel ==
Although Mass Effect: Andromeda was not designed with specific plans for future installments, BioWare's original intention was to continue adding to the series. However, following the game's disappointing commercial and critical reception, reports arose that BioWare Edmonton would be taking a break from the franchise to focus on their new IP, Anthem, and that BioWare Montreal would focus on other games under the EA umbrella, such as Star Wars Battlefront II. In August 2017, BioWare Montreal was merged with EA's Motive Studio, casting further doubt on the future of the Mass Effect franchise. However, former series creative director Casey Hudson, who departed from BioWare in 2014, but returned following Mass Effect: Andromeda's release, later stated that he wanted the series to continue. As of November 7, 2020, a veteran team at BioWare was working on the next chapter of the Mass Effect universe. In May 2023, Mac Walters noted: "I only wish we had been able to then do a second one, because then you would have really seen that polish just like we did from [ME1] to [ME2] on the original [trilogy]."

On October 22, 2026, Electronic Arts shut down BioWare and the studio announced cancellation of development on the next Mass Effect title, which had been in early development since 2020.
