= 20th Century Home Entertainment =

American home video distributor

20th Century Studios Home Entertainment
- Main and final logo used during its operating years until 2020.
- Formerly: 20th Century-Fox Video (1981–1982); CBS/Fox Video (1982–2000); Fox Video (1991–1998); 20th Century Fox Home Entertainment (1995–2020)
- Type: Label
- Industry: Home video
- Predecessor: Magnetic Video (1968–1982)
- Founded: 1981; 45 years ago
- Defunct: 2020; 6 years ago
- Fate: Folded into Walt Disney Studios Home Entertainment; still exists as brand label
- Headquarters: Beverly Hills, California, United States
- Key people: Keith Feldman (president)
- Products: Home video
- Brands: 20th Century Studios; Searchlight Pictures; 20th Century Animation; 20th Century Family; 20th Television; FX Productions (until 2020); Searchlight Television; 20th Television Animation; Blue Sky Studios (until 2021)
- Parent: 20th Century Fox (1981–2020); CBS (1982–1995); Walt Disney Studios Home Entertainment (2020)
- Website: www.20thcenturystudios.com/movies#new-to-home-entertainment

20th Century Home Entertainment (previously known as Twentieth Century Fox Home Entertainment, LLC) was a home video distribution arm that distributed films produced by 20th Century Studios, Searchlight Pictures, Blue Sky Studios, 20th Century Animation and several third-party studios, as well as television series by 20th Television, Searchlight Television, 20th Television Animation and FX Productions (until 2020) in home entertainment formats.

For 38 years, 20th Century Home Entertainment was the distinct home video distribution arm of Fox Entertainment Group. It was formed in 1982 as 20th Century-Fox Video. On March 20, 2019, The Walt Disney Company acquired 21st Century Fox, and as a result, its operations were folded into Walt Disney Studios Home Entertainment, Disney's own home entertainment division.

== History ==
=== 20th Century-Fox Video (1981–1982) ===
20th Century-Fox Video
- Type: Division
- Industry: Home video; Film distribution
- Predecessor: Magnetic Video Corporation
- Founded: c. 1981; 45 years ago
- Defunct: January 14, 1983; 43 years ago
- Fate: Merged with CBS Video Enterprises to form CBS/Fox Video
- Successor: CBS/Fox Video
- Headquarters: Farmington Hills, Michigan
- Parent: Twentieth Century-Fox Film Corporation

From 1976 to 1981, the video distribution arm had been under a deal with a home entertainment company called Magnetic Video, a small independent home video distributor founded by Andre Blay and Leon Nicholson that was based in Farmington Hills, Michigan, after a previous relationship with the company. In March 1979, 20th Century-Fox acquired Magnetic Video. In late 1981, Fox renamed Magnetic Video Corporation to 20th Century-Fox Video and continued to be headquartered in Farmington Hills, Michigan. However, Blay was forced out at the time, with Telecommunications division president and CEO Steve Roberts taking charge of TCF Video.

During this time, 20th Century-Fox Video released a few titles for rental only, including Eye of the Needle, Caveman, Death Hunt, Dr. No, A Fistful of Dollars, Rocky, Taps, For Your Eyes Only, Omen III: The Final Conflict, Chu Chu and the Philly Flash (aka Chu Chu and the Philadelphia Flash), La Cage aux Folles II, and Star Wars. While sale tapes were in big boxes that were later used by CBS/Fox in its early years (dubbed "Fox Boxes" by VHS collectors), Video Rental Library tapes were packaged in black clamshell cases. Similar approaches were taken by other companies; however, none lasted long.

=== CBS/Fox Video/Fox Video (1982–2000) ===
CBS/Fox Video
- Trade name: CBS/Fox Video
- Type: Joint venture
- Industry: Home video
- Predecessors: 20th Century-Fox Video; CBS Video Enterprises
- Founded: June 20, 1982; 44 years ago
- Defunct: 2000; 26 years ago
- Fate: Closed
- Successors: 20th Century Fox Home Entertainment; Walt Disney Studios Home Entertainment; Sony Pictures Home Entertainment; Studio Distribution Services; CBS Home Entertainment; Paramount Home Entertainment
- Headquarters: Farmington Hills, Michigan (1982–1985); Livonia, Michigan (1986–1988); New York City, New York (1989–1991), United States
- Area served: Worldwide
- Products: Home media
- Owners: CBS Inc. (50%); 20th Century Fox (50%)

In June 1982, 20th Century Fox entered into a joint venture with CBS to form CBS/Fox Video; Roberts remained head of the joint-venture, but was replaced as president in January 1983 by a former Columbia Pictures executive, Larry Hilford. Hilford had been a verbal critic of the video rental business, but with the situation out of their control, he attempted to make the situation work for them. CBS/Fox and other home video units increased prices of the cassettes by around 67% to maximize income. They also moved to encourage customer purchasing instead of renting. As a part of that, CBS/Fox looked to existing retail chains for direct sales. Toys "R" Us and Child World signed the first direct deals in July 1985 with CBS/Fox. Walt Disney Home Video soon followed with a direct deal with Toys "R" Us.

During this period, two sub-labels of the company were created. The first was Key Video, launched in April 1984, structured as a separate company but utilizing the CBS/Fox sales and marketing arms; Key's remit was to exploit catalog titles (from both CBS and Fox as well as other companies whose catalogs CBS/Fox had access to at the time, including Lorimar, ITC and United Artists) targeted towards collectors and longer shelf life than other titles (later expanded to include acquired titles and non-theatrical programming from outside CBS/Fox, primarily B-movies). Key's offerings were often, though not always, priced for sale at cheaper rates than mainstream CBS/Fox titles. The other was Playhouse Video, launched in February 1985 (replacing the short-lived CBS/Fox Children's Video label) and run in a similar fashion to Key Video, with an emphasis on children's and family titles, including those of The Muppets, Planet of the Apes original pentalogy, Shirley Temple movies and content from CBS (including the Dr. Seuss specials owned by the network and Peanuts movies and specials). Both of these labels were rendered inactive by 1991; under Fox, the Key Video name (later renamed to Key DVD) made a brief comeback in the 2000s.

In March 1991, a reorganization of the company was made, which would give Fox greater control of the joint venture. All of CBS/Fox's distribution functions were transferred to the newly formed Fox Video, which would also take over exclusive distribution of all 20th Century Fox products. CBS began releasing their products under the "CBS Video" name (which had been sparingly used since the 1970s), with CBS/Fox handling marketing and Fox Video handling distribution. CBS/Fox would retain the license to non-theatrical products from third parties, including those from BBC Video and the NBA.

Fox Video was run by president Bob DeLellis, a 1984 hire at CBS/Fox who had risen to group vice president and president by 1991. With expected repeat viewing, FoxVideo dropped prices on family films starting in June 1991 with Home Alone at a suggested list price of $24.98, to encourage purchasing over rental.

Bill Mechanic's arrival in 1993 from Walt Disney Home Video, as the new head of Fox Filmed Entertainment, saw new plans to move Fox forward, including Fox Video. However, DeLellis was initially left alone, as Mechanic was occupied setting up multiple creative divisions within Fox. Mechanic had been the one to install the "Vault" moratorium strategy at Disney. Mrs. Doubtfire was released soon after Mechanic's arrival with a sell through price, and surpassed sale projections at 10 million tapes. In 1995, FoxVideo launched a line, Fox Kids Video, in order to release various titles that was aired on the Fox Kids Network, such as Bobby's World, The Tick, Eek! the Cat and Where on Earth Is Carmen Sandiego?, although the name was previously used a year earlier on the three volumes of the Bobby's World show.

=== 20th Century Fox Home Entertainment (1995–2020) ===
The company was renamed Twentieth Century Fox Home Entertainment on March 16, 1995, after Fox Entertainment Group acquired CBS's interest in CBS/Fox. The reorganization also created additional distribution operations (Fox Kids Video, CBS Video, and CBS/Fox Video) and two new media units, Fox Interactive and Magnet Interactive Studios. Total revenue for the expanded business unit would have been over $800 million, with FoxVideo providing the bulk at $650 million. Mechanic kept DeLellis as president of the expanded unit's North American operation, with Jeff Yap as international president. By May 1995, Fox had Magnet under a worldwide label deal for 10 to 12 titles through 1996. TCFHE would also be responsible for DVD when they hit the market. Mechanic had Fox Home Entertainment institute the moratorium strategy with the August 1995 release of the three original Star Wars movies giving them a sales window before going off the market forever; four months for New Hope, and until the fall of 1997 for The Empire Strikes Back and Return of the Jedi. Sales topped 30 million copies over expectations. The company's 1996 release of Independence Day sold 18 million units, making it the industry's bestselling live-action home video release.

With the May 1997 departure of DeLellis, a quick rotation of presidents led Fox Home Entertainment: Yapp for four months before he left to lead Hollywood Video, then an interim president—Pat Wyatt, head of 20th Century Fox Licensing & Merchandising, who assumed the post in September 1997. With DVD being a Warner Home Video property, the company did not initially issue DVDs; instead, Fox advocated for digital VHS tapes (which eventually emerged as the obscure D-Theater), then the disposable DIVX. DIVX was a DVD variant that had limited viewing time, launched by the Circuit City consumer electronics chain in June 1998. With DVD's low cost at $20 and DIVX at $4.50, and the desirability for consumers to own DVDs, the DVD format won quickly out over DIVX. News Corporation chief Rupert Murdoch wanted a deal with Time Warner Cable, as to secure a lower channel position for the then-new Fox Family Channel, so Mechanic adopted the DVD format to smooth the deal.

By 1998, Wyatt became permanent president of 20th Century Fox Home Entertainment. Wyatt then became head of Fox Consumer Products, which put together the video and licensing unit. Wyatt had to drop the licensing half eventually, as the home video unit boomed. DVD sales were so strong during this period that they factored into green-lighting theatrical films. Wyatt reorganized Fox Home Entertainment, and forged a partnership with replicator Cinram. Being ahead of the other studios, TCFHE began picking up additional outside labels as distribution clients, with their fees covering the company's overhead. Fox Home Entertainment won multiple Vendor of the Year awards. Wyatt's system was a great edge for years. The TV-on-DVD business was initiated by Wyatt through the release of whole seasons of The Simpsons, The X-Files, 24, Prison Break, It's Always Sunny in Philadelphia, and Family Guy, among other television shows, which started the binge-watching concept. However, the videocassette rental business was declining such that video rental chains signed revenue-sharing deals with the studios, so additional copies of hits could be brought in for a lower price, and share sales for more customer satisfaction.

Mechanic left Fox in June 2000, while Wyatt resigned in December 2002. Jim Gianopulos replaced Mechanic, while executive vice president of domestic marketing and sales, Mike Dunn, took over from Wyatt. Wyatt left to start a direct-to-video film production and financing company for Japanese-style animated programming.

In 2004, 20th Century Fox passed on theatrical distribution, but picked up domestic home video rights to The Passion of the Christ. Passion sold 15 million DVDs. TCFHE continued obtaining additional Christian films' domestic home video rights for movies like Mother Teresa and the Beyond the Gates of Splendor documentary. After a 2005 test with a Fox Faith website, in 2006, 20th Century Fox Home Entertainment launched its own film production banner for religious films using the same name.

Effective October 1, 2005, 20th Century Fox Scandinavia was split into two, 20th Century Fox Theatrical Sweden and 20th Century Fox Home Entertainment Scandinavia. For the Home Entertainment Scandinavia division, Peter Paumgardhen was appointed managing director and would report to senior vice president of 20th Century Fox Home Entertainment Europe Gary Ferguson.

By 2005, DVD was on the decline and the rise of HDTVs required a new, high-resolution format; Fox and half the studios backed Blu-ray, while the other half backed HD DVD, and some planned to issue releases in both formats. In late 2006, the company began releasing its titles on Blu-ray. Blu-ray won the format war in 2008, but with streaming services picking up in popularity and the Great Recession, the expected rebound in disc sales never happened.

With Metro-Goldwyn-Mayer (MGM) moving its home video distribution to TCFHE in 2006, by this time the company had moved into second place behind Warner Bros. and ahead of Walt Disney, and had its best year yet. In October, Fox Home Entertainment issued the first to include a digital copy along on a disc with the special-edition DVD of Live Free or Die Hard. The 2010 Blu-ray release of Avatar was the year's top-selling title and the top Blu-ray Disc seller, with 5 million units sold. In 2011, Fox released on Blu-ray Disc the full Star Wars double trilogy on 9 discs, a premium set selling 1 million units its first week in stores, generating $84 million in gross sales.

Variant introduced in 2010, usually shown on screen. This logo was also used in tandem with the 1995 logo until 2020.

In response to Warner Bros., Sony and MGM issuing manufactured-on-demand lines of no-frills DVD-R editions of older films in May 2012, TCFHE began its Cinema Archives series. By November 2012, the archive series had released 100 movies. Fox Home Entertainment also started the early window policy, where the digital version is released through digital retailers two or three weeks before the discs, and was launched with Prometheus in September 2012. This also started Fox's Digital HD program where customers could download or stream 600 Fox films on connected devices at less than $15/film through multiple major platforms. However, Digital HD was soon dropped as 4K, or Ultra HD, was introduced in 2012. In 2014, a high-tech think tank, Fox Innovation Lab, was formed under 20th Century Fox Home Entertainment.

In September 2015, the first Ultra HD Blu-ray player was introduced, leading TCFHE to have future movies released the same day in Ultra HD Blu-ray as regular Blu-ray and DVD. The first Ultra HD Blu-ray films were released in March 2016, with Fox being one of four studios involved; Fox had had the most titles with 10.

Dunn added another title in December 2016: president of product strategy and consumer business development. Dunn turned over TCFHE in March 2017 to Keith Feldman taking over his older title, president of worldwide home entertainment. Feldman was previously president of worldwide home entertainment distribution, and, before that, president of international.

=== 20th Century Home Entertainment (2020–present) ===
In December 2017, the acquisition of 21st Century Fox by The Walt Disney Company was proposed. Disney acquired most of 21st Century Fox's entertainment assets on March 20, 2019, including 20th Century Fox Home Entertainment. On January 17, 2020, Disney retired the "Fox" name from several of the acquired 21st Century Fox assets (to avoid confusion with Fox Corporation), including the renaming of 20th Century Fox Home Entertainment as 20th Century Home Entertainment. Disney also folded 20th Century Fox Home Entertainment into their existing Walt Disney Studios Home Entertainment division to be used solely as a brand label for films and television series by 20th Century Studios, Searchlight Pictures, 20th Television, Blue Sky Studios, 20th Century Animation, Searchlight Television, 20th Television Animation, and FX Productions. Additionally, the 20th Century Studios logo now serves as the all-encompassing logo for 20th Century Home Entertainment.

As a result of Disney's acquisition of 21st Century Fox, MGM's home media deal with 20th Century expired and transferred to Warner Bros. Home Entertainment on June 30, 2020.

Following the launch of Disney+ in 2019 and its international expansion in the following years, Walt Disney Studios Home Entertainment (which had been distributing 20th Century and Searchlight titles since 2020) has begun to discontinue physical distribution entirely in certain regions such as Latin America, Australia, New Zealand, Russia, Greece, India, the Middle East, Portugal, Asia (except for Japan), Hungary and Romania, or to let other companies distribute in certain international markets like the United Kingdom (Elevation Sales), Poland (Galapagos), Czech Republic (Magic Box), Spain (Divisa Films), Italy (Eagle Pictures), Scandinavia (SF Studios), France and Benelux (ESC Distribution), Germany, Austria and Switzerland (Leonine Studios) and Japan (Happinet). The new agreement negotiated by Bob Iger CEO, Luke Kang VP, Gohn Gelke AVP and Gerard Devan Group Executive is an amendment to the original agreement between 20th Century Fox and HBO that Disney inherited after its acquisition of Fox in 2019, and as such, is not expected to be renewed. Following the end of the 20th Century-HBO deal, Disney plans to retain the 20th Century films on their own streaming platforms going forward after 2022.

In February 2024, Disney entered into a home video distribution agreement with Sony Pictures Home Entertainment, in which Sony would handle all physical media production and distribution for Disney's home entertainment assets in the United States and Canada. The first 20th Century Studios film to be released by Sony was the home media release of The First Omen on July 30, 2024.

== Catalog library ==
20th Century Home Entertainment is used by Walt Disney Studios Home Entertainment as the home video label for products released under the 20th Century Studios, Searchlight Pictures, Blue Sky Studios, 20th Century Animation, 20th Century Family, 20th Television, and 20th Television Animation and FX Productions banners. In 2020, all operations moved to Walt Disney Studios Home Entertainment. 20th Century's best-selling DVD titles are the various season box sets of The Simpsons.

=== Distribution agreements ===
==== Guild/Pathé ====
Since July 1993, Fox's Home video operations in France have operated as a joint venture. The joint venture was originally between Fox, Pathé and Le Studio Canal+, and was known as PFC Vidéo (Pathé Fox Canal). In January 2001, StudioCanal exited the venture to start distributing releases through then-sister company Universal Pictures Video France (later switching to self-distributing their releases), and EuropaCorp joined the joint-venture. Effectively, the venture was renamed as Fox Pathé Europa. The venture ended shortly after Disney's purchase of 20th Century Fox, with Pathé and EuropaCorp moving to ESC Distribution.

From 1995 to 2020, Fox held a distribution partnership with Pathé's UK branch as well, which began after the then-named Guild entered into the 50-50 rental joint venture with Fox's UK branch called Fox Guild Home Entertainment. The deal also allowed Fox to take over retail distribution of Guild products from PolyGram Video. After Pathé retired the Guild name in 1997, The 50-50 rental joint venture was renamed to Fox Pathé Home Entertainment the following year. This physical and digital agreement was later briefly carried over to Walt Disney Studios Home Entertainment following the purchase of Fox before expiring on June 30, 2021, after which, Warner Bros. Home Entertainment took over.

==== Saban Entertainment ====
In 1996, Fox Kids Network merged with Saban Entertainment to form Fox Kids Worldwide, which included the Marvel Productions and Marvel Films Animation library. Shortly afterward, Saban terminated its existing home video deal with WarnerVision Entertainment, and decided that they would move itself to TCFHE.

In 2001, the Walt Disney Company acquired Fox Family Worldwide, which included the Fox Family Channel, the Fox Kids brand and Saban Entertainment. A year later in 2002, Saban became BVS Entertainment and its titles transferred to Buena Vista Home Entertainment for distribution.

==== Metro-Goldwyn-Mayer ====
In 1999, after ending their worldwide deal with Warner Home Video, MGM signed a deal with 20th Century Fox Home Entertainment to release MGM's films outside of the United States and Canada.

In May 2003, MGM reinstated full distribution rights to their products in regions like Australia, France, Germany, and the United Kingdom, although 20th Century Fox Home Entertainment continued distributing MGM titles in a majority of developing regions.

In 2006, after ending a similar deal with Sony Pictures Home Entertainment, MGM signed a worldwide distribution deal with 20th Century Fox Home Entertainment, reinstating the rights internationally. TCFHE and MGM renewed their home video distribution deal twice (one in 2011 and one in June 2016), this deal would briefly be passed to Walt Disney Studios Home Entertainment in 2019, before expiring on June 30, 2020, with Warner Bros. Home Entertainment taking over that same year. As of 2021, Studio Distribution Services, LLC., a joint venture between Warner Bros. Home Entertainment and Universal Pictures Home Entertainment, distributes in North America, with releases initially alternating between the two companies until 2023.

==== Entertainment One ====
After a prior home entertainment distribution arrangement for Australia and Spain, in February 2016, Entertainment One (eOne) and 20th Century Fox Home Entertainment signed a new multi-territory distribution agreement, allowing Fox to distribute eOne's titles in the United Kingdom. Fox would manage eOne's existing home video distribution, starting in July 2016.

In March 2019, after the purchase of Fox by Disney, Entertainment One ended its deal with Fox and signed a multinational distribution deal with Universal Pictures Home Entertainment shortly after. With the acquisition of Entertainment One by Lionsgate in 2023, Lionsgate Home Entertainment took over the home media distribution rights of these catalogs.

==== DreamWorks Animation ====
In 2013, as part of DreamWorks Animation's existing five-year distribution deal with 20th Century Fox, Fox also released the company's films on home media. This was extended to include DreamWorks' pre-2013 catalog following DreamWorks' purchase of it from Paramount Pictures on July 1, 2014.

Fox's rights with DreamWorks ended in 2017 after the release of Captain Underpants: The First Epic Movie and the purchase of DreamWorks Animation by NBCUniversal a year prior. With that, DreamWorks transferred the home entertainment rights to its movies to Universal Pictures Home Entertainment.

==== Other American agreements ====
In the United States, the company also distributed products from Anchor Bay Entertainment, Relativity Media, EuropaCorp U.S.A. and Yari Film Group.

CBS/Fox Video also once served as a distributor for television and film products released by BBC Video in the United States until these rights expired on June 30, 2000, and weren't renewed. On June 28, 2000, BBC Worldwide announced a new partnership with Warner Home Video for the United States and Canada that would begin effectively on July 1, 2000, excluding the release of Walking with Dinosaurs, which was instead transferred over from CBS/Fox to Warner Home Video on September 1, 2000.

In 1998, after ending their deal with WEA Video, Artisan signed a deal with Fox to release Artisan's film library in the United States. After the Lionsgate purchase in December 2003, it was expanded to include Canada as well. The deal expired in July 2021, with Lionsgate signing a deal with Sony Pictures Home Entertainment to distribute Lionsgate's film library and future releases in the United States.

In February 2006, British-American children's company HIT Entertainment signed a multi-year, multi-million dollar deal with Fox for the exclusive North American marketing, sales, and distribution rights of its properties beginning in August of that year. The deal would significantly boost HIT's distribution to over 70,000 retail storefronts. The deal between the two companies occurred after HIT closed their standalone home video unit in North America. The distribution deal was not renewed and in February 2008, HIT signed a new home video deal with Lionsgate Home Entertainment.

In November 2006, following the major success of Fox's distribution of the company's Strawberry Shortcake series, animation studio DIC Entertainment struck a five-year deal with Fox to release a small selection of DIC's catalogue on DVD, with the deal including Inspector Gadget, Madeline, Dennis the Menace and Care Bears. The distribution deal continued with Cookie Jar Group after its purchase of DIC in 2008. Eventually, Cookie Jar's deal with Fox expired after 2011.

In 2007, to commemorate the successful sales of Strawberry Shortcake in North America, American Greetings extended their home video deal with Fox to include DVD releases of Care Bears: Adventures in Care-a-Lot and Sushi Pack. In January 2009, American Greetings announced that they would move their North American distribution to Lionsgate Home Entertainment; however, Strawberry Shortcake remained under Fox due to the 2003 deal, and was soon expanded to include Strawberry Shortcake's Berry Bitty Adventures.

In 2008, WWE Studios signed a deal with 20th Century Fox, allowing it to distribute one theatrical title and four direct-to-video titles annually.

20th Century Fox Home Entertainment started distributing Annapurna Pictures films in the United States, as part of a distribution pact that began on July 11, 2017. The deal expired at the end of 2019, following Fox's acquisition by Disney.

==== Other agreements ====
From July 1993 until 2001, Le Studio Canal+'s content was released through PFC Vidéo in France. They exited the venture to release content through Universal.

In June 2013, 20th Century Fox Home Entertainment and Paramount Home Entertainment formed a joint-venture partnership titled Fox-Paramount Home Entertainment in Nordic territories. In 2016, the company was shut down.

In late 2013, 20th Century Fox Home Entertainment began distributing Sony Pictures Home Entertainment titles in Spanish territories, including Latin America and Spain. The deal expired in June 2016, allowing Sony to distribute Universal and Paramount titles in Spain. Later that month, Fox signed a deal with Warner Bros. Home Entertainment to distribute Warner's library. The deal was extended in September 2019 after Disney acquired Fox as Walt Disney Studios Home Entertainment took over Fox on distributing Warner's library in the country, starting in May 2020. When Divisa Home Video started distributing Disney's titles, the deal expired in April 2022, as Arvi Licensing (a joint venture between Universal and Sony Pictures) signed a deal with Warner to distribute its library.

In Italy, 20th Century Fox has distributed all the titles from Mediafilm on home media from 2005 to 2011.
