= History of the World, Part II =

2023 American sketch comedy series

- Genre: Sketch comedy
- Based on: History of the World, Part I by Mel Brooks
- Starring: Wanda Sykes; Nick Kroll; Ike Barinholtz
- Narrated by: Mel Brooks
- Country of origin: United States
- Original language: English
- No. of seasons: 1
- No. of episodes: 8

Production
- Executive producers: Mel Brooks; Wanda Sykes; Nick Kroll; Ike Barinholtz; David Stassen; Kevin Salter; Christie Smith
- Running time: 29−31 minutes
- Production companies: Good At Bizness, Inc.; 23 * 34; Brooksfilms Limited; 20th Television; Searchlight Television

Original release
- Network: Hulu
- Release: March 6 – March 9, 2023

History of the World, Part II is an American sketch comedy limited television series written and produced by Mel Brooks, Wanda Sykes, Nick Kroll, Ike Barinholtz, and David Stassen. The series serves as a sequel to the 1981 film written and directed by Brooks, with sketches parodying events from different periods of human history and legend. It premiered on March 6, 2023, on Hulu.

== Cast ==
The cast features a large ensemble, including a core of several regulars who are also among the series writers:

=== Main ===
- Mel Brooks as Narrator. Orson Welles served as Narrator in History of the World, Part I (1981).
- Wanda Sykes as various characters, including Harriet Tubman, Bessie Coleman, and Shirley Chisholm.
- Nick Kroll as various characters, including Schmuck Mudman, Judas, Galileo, Henry Kissinger, and Japheth.
- Ike Barinholtz as various characters, including Ulysses S. Grant, Alexander Graham Bell, Leon Trotsky, and Theodore Roosevelt.

=== Recurring ===
- Johnny Knoxville as Grigori Rasputin
- Jason "Wee Man" Acuña as Russian Assassin
- Chris Pontius as Russian Assassin
- Preston Lacy as Russian Noble
- Pamela Adlon as Fanny Mudman (loosely based on Fanny Kaplan)
- Charles Melton as Joshy Mudman
- Will Sasso as Fred
- Dove Cameron as Princess Anastasia Romanov
- Danny DeVito as Tsar Nicolas Romanov
- Ana Ortiz as Princess Alix
- Lisa Gilroy as a Romanov daughter / Eva Braun
- Rob Corddry as Vladimir Lenin
- Jack Black as Joseph Stalin
  - Craig Cackowski as 1940s Joseph Stalin
- Wendi McLendon-Covey as Russian Peasant
- Kumail Nanjiani as Vātsyāyana
- Sarayu Rao as Publisher
- Parvesh Cheena as Publisher
- Josh Gad as William Shakespeare
- Lauren Lapkus as Shakespeare Writer
- Lance Crouther as Shakespeare Writer
- Seth Morris as Freud Patient / Shakespeare Writer
- Taika Waititi as Sigmund Freud
- Guy Branum as Serf Board Vendor / Hare
- Paul Scheer as Bot Seed Vendor
- Fred Armisen as Glorp
- Rob Riggle as Roman Soldier
- Ayo Edebiri as Underground Railroad Slave
- Rachel Pegram as Japeth's Wife
- Jay Ellis as Jesus
- Anna Maria Horsford as Mother Mary
- Zazie Beetz as Mary Magdalene
- Quinta Brunson as Martha Magdalene
- Richard Kind as Saint Peter
- J. B. Smoove as Luke
- Andy Cohen as Andy Khan
- Ronny Chieng as Kublai Khan
- Jake Johnson as Marco Polo
- Poppy Liu as Ehri
- Kimiko Glenn as Chabi
- Jenifer Lewis as Grandma
- Jon Daly as Glenn
- Hannah Einbinder as Amelia Earhart
- Josh Fadem as Private Bryant
- Lennon Parham as Berlin Wall-pecker
- Owen Burke as Boris / Red Sox Fan
- Jillian Bell as Head Writer
- Ken Marino as Archbishop
- Emily Ratajkowski as White Mary Magdalene
- Brock O'Hurn as White Swole Jesus / Swole Mel Brooks
- Casey Wilson as White Mother Mary / Gloria Steinem
- David Duchovny as Howard Cosell Impersonator
- Marla Gibbs as Ruby Seale
- Colton Dunn as Conrad Chisholm
- Kym Whitley as Florynce Kennedy
- George Wallace as George Wallace
- Blake Griffin as Muhammad Ali
- Finesse Mitchell as Jesse Jackson
- James Adomian as President Richard Nixon / FDR
- Mary Holland as Typhoid Mary
- Mitra Jouhari as various characters
- Scott MacArthur as WV Man
- Andy Daly as Norwegian Ambassador
- Jason Mantzoukas as Greek Ambassador
- Mena Massoud as Egyptian Ambassador
- D'Arcy Carden as Turkish Ambassador
- Mousa Kraish as Palestinian Ambassador
- Michaela Watkins as Israeli Ambassador
- Crystal Kung Minkoff as Crystal
- Pam Oliver as Herself
- Gil Ozeri as Zakher
- Andrew Rannells as Sergei
- Seth Rogen as Noah
- Jessica St. Clair as Sarah
- Sarah Silverman as Lt. Silverman
- Edgar Blackmon as Private Johnson
- Jack McBrayer as Robert E. Lee
- Josh Meyers as General Philip Sheridan
- Jason Alexander as Maurice Cheeks
- Timothy Simons as Abraham Lincoln
- Nick Robinson as Robert Todd Lincoln
- Tim Baltz as Lt. Henry Honeybeard
- Tyler James Williams as Mason Dixon
- Zahn McClarnon as Mingoes
- David Stassen as Sitcom Director / Union Soldier
- Dan Bakkedahl as Winston Churchill
- Malcolm Barrett as Captain Hanks / Idi Amin
- Drew Tarver as Adolf Hitler / Private Tully
- Eugene Cordero as Private Cooper
- Natalie Morales as Cavewoman
- Reggie Watts as Hans

== Episodes ==
No.	Title	Directed by	Written by	Original release date
1	"I"	Alice Mathias, David Stassen, Nick Kroll, Lance Bangs	Ike Barinholtz, Emmy Blotnick, Guy Branum, Mel Brooks, Owen Burke, Adam Countee, Lance Crouther, Ana Fabrega, Fran Gillespie, Janelle James, Jennifer Kim, Nick Kroll, Sergio Serna, David Stassen, Wanda Sykes	March 6, 2023
In 1865, President Abraham Lincoln instructs Ulysses S. Grant to look after his son, Robert, as the Civil War nears its end. The Romanovs are murdered and Princess Anastasia is kidnapped at the dawn of the Russian Revolution. A family of Jewish shtetl dwellers decides to leave for Moscow, and later Rasputin is murdered by the cast of Jackass. In 400 BCE India, Vātsyāyana pitches the Kama Sutra as a cookbook. Three cavewomen discover fire while struggling to light a joint. A new hire struggles to fit into William Shakespeare's writers' room. Sports commentators react to Hitler on Ice.
2	"II"	Alice Mathias, David Stassen	Ike Barinholtz, Emmy Blotnick, Guy Branum, Mel Brooks, Owen Burke, Adam Countee, Lance Crouther, Ana Fabrega, Fran Gillespie, Janelle James, Jennifer Kim, Nick Kroll, Sergio Serna, David Stassen, Wanda Sykes	March 6, 2023
A group of soldiers get seasick on D-Day. Kublai Khan and Marco Polo exchange gifts. In a parody of Curb Your Enthusiasm, Judas is hired to betray Jesus for thirty pieces of silver. He and Luke go to Peter's one-man show, where he delivers the Kiss of Judas. In 1972, New York Representative Shirley Chisholm becomes the first black woman contender for the Democratic Party nomination for the US Presidency; she makes a sitcom about her life. She invites her boss, Richard Nixon, over for dinner and gets inspired to run for president. Grant and Robert Todd Lincoln head to Rock Ridge (not that one), West Virginia in search of liquor but end up held at gunpoint in a saloon.
3	"III"	Alice Mathias, David Stassen	Ike Barinholtz, Emmy Blotnick, Guy Branum, Mel Brooks, Owen Burke, Adam Countee, Lance Crouther, Ana Fabrega, Fran Gillespie, Janelle James, Jennifer Kim, Nick Kroll, Sergio Serna, David Stassen, Wanda Sykes	March 7, 2023
After inventing the telephone, Alexander Graham Bell gets the first crank call. Noah fills his ark with only dogs. Sigmund Freud gives a MasterClass on psychoanalysis. Three Union soldiers get lost while attempting to rescue Grant from West Virginia. They stumble upon the Underground Railroad where Harriet Tubman points them in the right direction. In Moscow, Schmuck Mudman gets a job serving lunch to Vladimir Lenin's politburo, where a bullied Joseph Stalin dreams of taking charge. Schmuck's wife, Fanny, plots Lenin's assassination. Their son, Joshy, finds Princess Anastasia in hiding and the two fall in love.
4	"IV"	Alice Mathias, David Stassen, Nick Kroll, Lance Bangs	Ike Barinholtz, Emmy Blotnick, Guy Branum, Mel Brooks, Owen Burke, Adam Countee, Lance Crouther, Ana Fabrega, Fran Gillespie, Janelle James, Jennifer Kim, Nick Kroll, Sergio Serna, David Stassen, Wanda Sykes	March 7, 2023
In Mesoamerica, a sacrificial virgin tries to claim she's had sex. In Russia, Fanny uses her husband's food cart to sneak into the politburo chambers and shoot Lenin, with Stalin secretly helping him die. Joshy and Anastasia announce their engagement, and the family decides to emigrate to America. In ancient Judea, Jesus and Mary Magdalene have their first date. In ancient Egypt, a scam artist entices a couple with a pyramid pyramid scheme.
5	"V"	Alice Mathias, Lance Bangs	Ike Barinholtz, Emmy Blotnick, Guy Branum, Mel Brooks, Owen Burke, Adam Countee, Lance Crouther, Ana Fabrega, Fran Gillespie, Janelle James, Jennifer Kim, Nick Kroll, Sergio Serna, David Stassen, Wanda Sykes	March 8, 2023
Galileo appears on Cameo and TikTok. General Grant and Robert Todd Lincoln are rescued by Harriet Tubman. Shirley Chisholm visits George Wallace in the hospital. The photographers at the Yalta Conference try to make things fun.
6	"VI"	Alice Mathias, David Stassen	Ike Barinholtz, Emmy Blotnick, Guy Branum, Mel Brooks, Owen Burke, Adam Countee, Lance Crouther, Ana Fabrega, Fran Gillespie, Janelle James, Jennifer Kim, Nick Kroll, Sergio Serna, David Stassen, Wanda Sykes	March 8, 2023
Jesus and the Apostles have their last jam session. Generals Grant and Lee attempt to sign the treaty at Appomattox Courthouse, but an officious notary wants to do everything by the book. Kublai Khan explains how he's probably your ancestor. A businessman touts his business of removing and reselling controversial statues. Amelia Earhart and Bessie Coleman advertise their "pilot bar" in the Bermuda Triangle.
7	"VII"	Alice Mathias	Ike Barinholtz, Emmy Blotnick, Guy Branum, Mel Brooks, Owen Burke, Adam Countee, Lance Crouther, Ana Fabrega, Fran Gillespie, Janelle James, Jennifer Kim, Nick Kroll, Sergio Serna, David Stassen, Wanda Sykes	March 9, 2023
At the Oslo Peace Accords, the factions argue over which people first created hummus. Shirley Chisholm and her husband relax at the Watergate Hotel, as Shirley tries to impress Jesse Jackson and Gloria Steinem, whose caucuses are also meeting there. Typhoid Mary livestreams her cooking show. Jesus and the Apostles give their rooftop sermon. The Real Concubines of Kublai Khan argue over the great Khan's affections.
8	"VIII"	Alice Mathias, David Stassen, Nick Kroll	Ike Barinholtz, Emmy Blotnick, Guy Branum, Mel Brooks, Owen Burke, Adam Countee, Lance Crouther, Ana Fabrega, Fran Gillespie, Janelle James, Jennifer Kim, Nick Kroll, Sergio Serna, David Stassen, Wanda Sykes	March 9, 2023
Two East Berliners accidentally tunnel into a man's bathroom. The First Council of Nicaea decides to retroactively make Jesus white, eventually turning him into an action movie star. Teddy Roosevelt shills for his bodybuilding course. The Chisholms travel to the 1972 Democratic National Convention. A "preview" of what's to come for next season, including The Great Fascist Bake Off, the Dust Bowl (grainy footage of a football game), and Jews in Space!

== Production ==
Despite the numeration History of the World, Part I, there were initially no plans for a sequel to the 1981 film. The title was a play on The History of the World by Sir Walter Raleigh, which was intended to be published in several volumes but only the first was completed.

However, in October 2021, Hulu and Searchlight Television announced the Part II sequel series was in the works, with production beginning in spring 2022. Mel Brooks would produce and write the series along with Wanda Sykes, Ike Barinholtz, and Nick Kroll, who would also appear.

== Release ==
The first two episodes premiered on Hulu on March 6, 2023, with the remaining episodes released over the following three days. It was released internationally on the same day as an original series on Disney+, under the dedicated streaming hub Star, on Disney+ Hotstar in India, and on Star+ in Latin America.

== Reception ==
=== Audience viewership ===
According to Hulu, History of the World, Part II was the most-watched Hulu Original scripted original series of 2023 in its first week of launch.

=== Critical response ===
On the review aggregator website Rotten Tomatoes, 75% of 51 critics' reviews are positive, with an average rating of 6.1/10. The website's consensus reads: "Nick Kroll takes up the torch from Mel Brooks and does him proud with an all-star sketch series that's just as uproariously funny — and as hit-and-miss — as the original motion picture." Metacritic, which uses a weighted average, assigned a score of 64 out of 100 based on 22 critics, indicating "generally favorable reviews".

=== Accolades ===
Year	Award	Category	Nominee(s)	Result	Ref.
2023	Primetime Emmy Awards	Outstanding Picture Editing for Variety Programming	Angel Gamboa Bryant, Stephanie Filo, Daniel Flesher and George Mandl (Episode: "III")	Nominated	
2023	Primetime Emmy Awards	Outstanding Character Voice-Over Performance	Mel Brooks (Episode: "VIII")	Nominated	
2024	Art Directors Guild Awards	Excellence in Production Design for a Variety, Reality, or Competition Series	Monica Sotto (for "VIII")	Nominated	

== Future ==
David Stassen has said that he would be on board for a Part III and would love to feature more historical figures and eras. Pamela Adlon also said she would love to be involved in a second season. Jay Ellis, who plays Jesus Christ, said he would like to play Mayor Eric Adams, while Zazie Beetz, who plays Mary Magdalene, said she would be interested in playing Josephine Baker. Josh Gad, who plays William Shakespeare, said if he were given another go at it that he would like to play a young Seth Rogen.
