= History of the World, Part I =

1981 film by Mel Brooks

- Theatrical release poster by John Alvin
- Directed by: Mel Brooks
- Written by: Mel Brooks
- Produced by: Mel Brooks
- Starring: Mel Brooks; Dom DeLuise; Madeline Kahn; Harvey Korman; Cloris Leachman; Ron Carey; Gregory Hines; Pamela Stephenson; Shecky Greene; Sid Caesar; Mary-Margaret Humes
- Narrated by: Orson Welles
- Cinematography: Woody Omens
- Edited by: John C. Howard
- Music by: John Morris
- Production company: Brooksfilms
- Distributed by: 20th Century-Fox
- Release date: June 12, 1981
- Running time: 92 minutes
- Country: United States
- Language: English
- Budget: $10 million
- Box office: $31.7 million

History of the World, Part I is a 1981 American anthology comedy film written, produced, and directed by Mel Brooks. Brooks also stars in the film, playing five roles: Moses, Comicus the stand-up philosopher, Tomás de Torquemada, King Louis XVI, and Jacques, le garçon de pisse. The large ensemble cast also features Sid Caesar, Shecky Greene, Gregory Hines (in his film debut), Charlie Callas, and Brooks regulars Ron Carey, Dom DeLuise, Madeline Kahn, Harvey Korman, Cloris Leachman, Andreas Voutsinas, and Spike Milligan.

The film also has cameo appearances by Royce D. Applegate, Bea Arthur, Nigel Hawthorne, Hugh Hefner, John Hurt, Phil Leeds, Barry Levinson, Jackie Mason, Paul Mazursky, Andrew Sachs and Henny Youngman, among others. Orson Welles narrates each story.

Despite carrying the numeration Part I, there were originally no plans for a sequel. The title is a play on The History of the World by Sir Walter Raleigh, which was intended to be published in several volumes but only the first was completed because Raleigh was arrested and executed in 1618. However, four decades later, Hulu announced the miniseries History of the World, Part II, which premiered on March 6, 2023.

== Plot ==
The film is a parody of the epic film genre, including the sword and sandal epic and the period costume drama subgenres. The four main segments consist of stories set during the Stone Age, the Roman Empire, the Spanish Inquisition, and the French Revolution. Other intermediate skits include reenactments of the giving of the Ten Commandments and the Last Supper.

=== The Stone Age ===
Cavemen (including Sid Caesar) depict the invention of fire, the first artist (which in turn gives rise to the first critic), the first marriages (heterosexual and then homosexual), primitive weapons (particularly spears), and the first funerals. Also depicted are early attempts at comedy and music, by smashing each other's feet with rocks and thus creating an orchestra of howls.

=== The Old Testament ===
Moses (Mel Brooks) comes down from Mount Sinai carrying three stone tablets, having received the Law from God (the voice of an uncredited Carl Reiner). As Moses announces the giving of the Law to the people, he accidentally drops one of the tablets, which shatters, and he "corrects" his proclamation from 15 Commandments to 10.

=== The Roman Empire ===
Comicus (Brooks) is a "stand-up philosopher", dispensing wisdom in the style of a stand-up comedian. He is notified by his agent Swiftus (Ron Carey) that he has landed a gig at Caesar's palace. En route, he meets and falls in love with a Vestal Virgin named Miriam (Mary-Margaret Humes) and befriends an Ethiopian slave named Josephus (Gregory Hines).

Josephus is conscripted into the service of the Empress Nympho (Madeline Kahn). Comicus performs for Emperor Nero (Dom DeLuise), unwisely joking about the emperor's weight and corruption. Josephus absentmindedly pours a jug of wine into Nero's lap, and they are ordered to perform a gladiatorial fight to the death. They instead fight their way out of the palace, assisted by Miriam and Empress Nympho.

Comicus, Josephus, and Swiftus briefly take refuge in Nympho's palace, posing as eunuch guards. When Josephus' visible arousal exposes them both as imposters, they are chased by soldiers led by Marcus Vindictus (Shecky Greene). They escape in a cart pulled by a horse named Miracle, lighting a huge marijuana joint to put the pursuing soldiers into a stupor.

They sail to Judea, where Comicus takes a job waiting tables, and blunders into a private room where Jesus is having the Last Supper with his disciples. Comicus interrupts Jesus (John Hurt) repeatedly (using his name in the modern sense, as an interjection). Leonardo da Vinci (Art Metrano) arrives to paint the group's portrait, directing them to all sit on the same side of the table, with Comicus behind Jesus, where his raised platter looks like a halo.

=== The Spanish Inquisition ===
The Spanish Inquisition segment parodies a grandiose Busby Berkeley-style production, consisting of an extended song-and-dance number featuring Brooks as the infamous Torquemada. The sequence opens with a herald introducing Torquemada and making a play on his name; despite pleas for mercy from the condemned, "you can't Torquemada anything" (talk him outta anything). Instances of comical torture include auto-da-fé, a spinning iron maiden, and "water torture" re-imagined with nuns performing an Esther Williams-style aquatic ballet. Jackie Mason and Ronny Graham supply cameos as Jewish torture victims.

=== The French Revolution ===
In her Paris tavern, Madame Defarge (Cloris Leachman) incites a mob to plot the French Revolution. Meanwhile, King Louis of France (Brooks) is warned by his advisors, Count de Monet (Harvey Korman) and Béarnaise (Andreas Voutsinas), that the peasants do not think he likes them — a suspicion reinforced by the king's use of peasants as targets in a game of skeet. A beautiful woman, Mademoiselle Rimbaud (Pamela Stephenson), asks King Louis to free her father, who has been imprisoned in the Bastille for 10 years, which he agrees to only if she will have sex with him that night.

De Monet persuades King Louis to go into hiding, and look-alike Jacques (also Brooks) – whose job is to hold buckets for the aristocrats to urinate into – is chosen to impersonate the king as a decoy. That night, Rimbaud visits Jacques – believing him to be Louis – to consummate the deal to free her father, but he pardons him without requiring sexual favors. After Rimbaud and her senile father (Spike Milligan) return from the prison, peasants burst into the room and take "King" Jacques to the guillotine. When Rimbaud exclaims that "only a miracle can save him", Josephus inexplicably arrives in the cart pulled by Miracle, and they escape, riding off toward a mountain carved with the words THE END.

=== Previews of coming attractions ===
The end of the film presents a mock teaser trailer for History of the World, Part II, "coming soon". The trailer is narrated by Brooks, and shows clips of segments "Hitler on Ice", "A Viking Funeral", and "Jews in Space" (a parody of Star Wars).

== Cast ==
- Mel Brooks – Moses, Comicus, Torquemada, Jacques and King Louis XVI
- Dom DeLuise – Emperor Nero
- Madeline Kahn – Empress Nympho
- Harvey Korman – Count de Monet
- Cloris Leachman – Madame Defarge
- Ron Carey – Swiftus
- Gregory Hines – Josephus
- Pamela Stephenson – Mademoiselle Rimbaud
- Shecky Greene – Marcus Vindictus
- Sid Caesar – Chief Caveman
- Sammy Shore – Prehistoric Man
- Mary-Margaret Humes – Miriam
- Orson Welles – Narrator
- Carl Reiner – God (uncredited)

=== Ancient Rome cameos ===
- Howard Morris – Court Spokesman
- Charlie Callas – Soothsayer
- Paul Mazursky – Roman officer
- Henny Youngman – Chemist
- Hugh Hefner – Entrepreneur
- Barry Levinson – Column Salesman
- John Myhers – Leader of Senate
- Dena Dietrich – Competence
- Fritz Feld - Maître d'hôtel
- John Hurt – Jesus
- Art Metrano – Leonardo da Vinci
- Bea Arthur – "Unemployment Insurance" Clerk (Dole Office Clerk) (uncredited)
- Ronny Graham – Oedipus
- Pat McCormick – Plumbing Salesman

=== Spanish Inquisition cameos ===
- Ronny Graham – Jewish torture victim #1
- Jackie Mason – Jewish torture victim #2

=== French Revolution cameos ===
- Andreas Voutsinas – Béarnaise
- Spike Milligan – Monsieur Rimbaud
- Sydney Lassick – Applecore Vendor
- Jack Carter – Rat Vendor
- Jan Murray – Nothing Vendor
- John Hillerman – Rich Man
- Andrew Sachs – Gerard
- Fiona Richmond – Queen
- Nigel Hawthorne – Citizen Official
- Bella Emberg – Baguette

== Production ==
Brooks recalled that the inspiration for the film came about from an incident in 1979:

"I was walking across the parking lot at 20th Century-Fox on my way to my office when one of the grips who had worked on High Anxiety shouted to me from the back of a moving truck. 'Hey Mel, what's next? Planning a big one?'

From out of the blue the biggest title I could think of popped into my mind: 'Yes, the biggest movie ever made. It's called 'History of the World.'' Someone else on the truck yelled: 'How can you cover the whole world in one movie?'

'You're right,' I shouted. 'Maybe I'll call it 'History of the World — Part I.'"

Richard Pryor was to play the role of Josephus, but two days before he was to shoot his part he was hospitalized with serious burns in a much-publicized incident. Brooks was about to write the part out when Madeline Kahn suggested Gregory Hines. John Cleese was originally scheduled to play "Count de Monet" but due to scheduling conflicts Harvey Korman was instead cast.

Orson Welles was slated to do five days worth of voice recording sessions as the Narrator, but he did his lines in just a few hours.

Comicus's arrival at Caesar's palace was filmed at the Caesars Palace hotel in Las Vegas.

One scene was removed from the final cut of the film that referred to the Three Mile Island accident. "I had a father and a mother," Brooks said, "made up to look like half a dog and half a cat as a result of a nuclear meltdown. But the audience was seriously chilled and didn't laugh, so I left it out."

== Release ==
=== Critical reception ===
The film holds an approval rating of 62% on Rotten Tomatoes, based on 37 reviews. The site's consensus reads: "History of the World Part 1 may not have enough comedic inspiration to merit a Part 2, but the sporadic cleverness of these anachronistic skits are [sic] still a testament to Mel Brooks' gift of farce". Metacritic, which uses a weighted average, assigned the film a score of 47 out of 100, based on 9 critics, indicating "mixed or average" reviews. It was nominated for Worst Picture at the 1981 Stinkers Bad Movie Awards but lost to Tarzan, the Ape Man. The revised ballot, released in 2007, removed its Worst Picture nomination and instead nominated it for Most Painfully Unfunny Comedy (which it won). It also garnered a Worst Song nomination at the same ceremony for "The Inquisition" (lost to "Baby Talk" from Paternity).

Roger Ebert gave the film two stars out of four and described it as "a rambling, undisciplined, sometimes embarrassing failure from one of the most gifted comic filmmakers around. What went wrong? Brooks never seems to have a clear idea of the rationale of his movie, so there's no confident narrative impetus to carry it along." Gene Siskel, however, gave it three stars out of four and said that even though the film "borrows heavily from [Brooks'] previous work," it "contains a bunch of solid laughs." Janet Maslin of The New York Times wrote, "There are loads of familiarly funny gags in the film ... But the movie is so sour that its humor is often undermined, because so many of the jokes are either mean-spirited or scatological, or both."

Pauline Kael of The New Yorker described the film as "show business through the ages, and some of the routines are golden shtick." She was positive when she wrote, "It's an all-out assault on taste and taboo, and it made me laugh a lot." Variety called it "a disappointingly uneven farce which serves up a fair share of hearty laughs during its first half, but sputters out long before the close." Sheila Benson of the Los Angeles Times wrote, "Presumably everyone was so busy doing shtick and reacting off each other that there was no one left to mind the story and to say, 'Not funny.' Not only not funny, but a big, overblown, crashing bore, fellas." Gary Arnold of The Washington Post called it "an entertaining mishmash of skits which finds Mel Brooks back in lively form, for better and for worse ... To a considerable extent the funny stuff works in a laughing-in-spite-of-yourself way." Leonard Maltin's film guide gave the movie one-and-a-half out of a possible four stars and stated that the gags "range from hilarious to hideous. After a while there's no more momentum, and it all just lies there, despite the efforts of a large comic cast."

=== Box office ===
The film opened in 484 theatres the same weekend as Raiders of the Lost Ark and Clash of the Titans and finished fourth for the weekend with a gross of $4.8 million, behind Raiders, Clash and Cheech and Chong's Nice Dreams. With a per-screen average of $10,000, it was Brooks's highest opening on a per-screen basis. Despite the strong start, poor word of mouth impacted its box office. Although it grossed $31.7 million, it was considered a commercial disappointment because the film had been "tracking" well and Brooks's previous films had been so successful.

=== Home media ===
History of the World, Part I was released on DVD. According to the MPAA, it was rated "R" for "crude sexual humor, language, comic violence, sex and nudity, and drug use". In May 2010, it was released on Blu-ray.

== Sequel series ==
On October 18, 2021, Hulu and Searchlight Television (the TV division of 20th Century's sister studio, Searchlight Pictures) announced that a sequel variety series, called History of the World, Part II was in the works, with production beginning in spring 2022. Mel Brooks produced and wrote the series along with Wanda Sykes, Ike Barinholtz, and Nick Kroll, who also star. It premiered on March 6, 2023.

== See also ==
- List of films featuring fictional films
