= The Kingdom of Gods =

Novel by N. K. Jemisin

- First edition
- Author: N. K. Jemisin
- Cover artist: Cliff Nielsen
- Language: English
- Series: The Inheritance Trilogy #3
- Genre: Fantasy
- Publisher: Orbit
- Publication date: 1 September 2011
- ISBN: 9780316043953
- OCLC: 1035759767
- Preceded by: The Broken Kingdoms

The Kingdom of Gods is a 2011 fantasy novel by American writer N. K. Jemisin, the third book of her The Inheritance Trilogy.

== Plot summary ==
The Kingdom of Gods takes place about 100 years after the events of The Broken Kingdoms and centers around the godling Sieh. The god of childhood and mischief, he is suddenly transformed into a mortal in the presence of twin Arameri children, Shahar and Deka.

The shock destroys part of the underpalace of the city of Sky, and sends Sieh from the mortal realm to recover for around eight years. When he wakes up, he reunites with Shahar, who is now poised to become heir to the Arameri family. The two quickly fall in love, and Sieh begins to age quickly as he takes on adult situations and responsibilities.

Sieh must uncover the reason he has become mortal, as well as a string of assassinations of Arameri family members.

== Characters ==
- Sieh – The Trickster and god of childhood, one of the godlings formerly enslaved by the Arameri.
- Shahar Arameri – Sieh's friend and lover, and heir to the head of the Arameri family.
- Dekarta Arameri (also called Deka) – Shahar's twin, he studies to be a Scrivener (a scholar who studies the god's language and uses it via writing specific god-words) at the Litaria.
- Hymn – A young woman in the city of Shadow who reluctantly helps Sieh find his way.
- Itempas – One of The Three (primary gods of the realm). The god of day, light, and order.
- Yeine – One of The Three. The resurrected god of life and death. A warm, maternal figure for Sieh.
- Nahadoth – One of The Three. The god of night, darkness, and change.
- Ahad – The former shell of Nahadoth during his enslavement with the Arameri, now a godling in the city of Shadow.
- Glee Shoth – A demon (spawn of god and mortal) who associates with Itempas and Ahad.
- Remath Arameri – The head of the Arameri.

== Reception ==
The book was well received. Publishers Weekly noted that "Jemisin is as talented as ever, and the focus on desperate longing lends the series thematic unity."

Year	Award	Result	Ref
2011	Nebula Award for Best Novel	Finalist	
2012	Locus Award for Best Fantasy Novel	Finalist	
