= The Hundred Thousand Kingdoms =

2010 novel by N. K. Jemisin

- First edition cover
- Author: N. K. Jemisin
- Cover artist: Cliff Nielsen for US version
- Language: English
- Series: The Inheritance Trilogy #1
- Genre: Fantasy
- Publisher: Orbit
- Publication date: 25 February 2010
- Publication place: United States
- Media type: Print (Paperback & Hardcover); Audio CD
- Pages: 398
- ISBN: 9780316043915
- Followed by: The Broken Kingdoms

The Hundred Thousand Kingdoms is a fantasy novel by American writer N. K. Jemisin, the first book of The Inheritance Trilogy. Jemisin's debut novel, it was published by Orbit Books in 2010. It won the 2011 Locus Award for Best First Novel and was nominated for the World Fantasy, Hugo, and Nebula awards, among others. Its sequel, The Broken Kingdoms, came out later that year.

== Summary ==
Yeine Darr, mourning the murder of her mother, is summoned to the magnificent floating city of Sky by her grandfather Dekarta, the ruler of the world and head of the Arameri family. As Yeine is also Arameri (though estranged due to the circumstances of her birth), he names her his heir but has already assigned that role to both his niece and his nephew, resulting in a thorny three-way power struggle. Yeine must quickly master the intricacies of the cruel Arameri society to have any hope of winning. She is also drawn into the intrigues of the gods, four of whom dwell in Sky as the Arameri's powerful, enslaved weapons. With only a few days until the ceremony of the Arameri succession, Yeine struggles to solve her mother's murder while surviving the machinations of her relatives and the gods.

== Plot ==
Yeine Darr was born to Kinneth Arameri, who was heir to the Arameri throne but abdicated twenty years before the start of the story to marry Yeine's father, a Darre man. Kinneth was disowned by Dekarta (patriarch of the ruling Arameri family), and Darr blacklisted by the Arameri (throwing the country into a crippling economic crisis) as a result.

The day she arrives, she meets T'vril, the palace steward, who is also an Arameri (although lower-ranked); the entire palace staff down to the floor cleaning servants is Arameri. This is because only Arameri are permitted to pass a night in Sky, for reasons that T'vril does not immediately explain. T'vril attempts to get Yeine to Viraine—the palace scrivener—to be "marked" as an Arameri before nightfall. However, Scimina, one of the other potential heirs, finds them first. Because Yeine lacks the mark, she unleashes Nahadoth, one of the Arameri's captive gods, on Yeine.

Yeine flees and is assisted by Sieh, another of the captive gods. Before they can escape, Nahadoth catches up and attacks Sieh, whereupon Yeine stabs Nahadoth to apparent death with her knife. Nahadoth kisses her before he falls, saying he has been waiting for her, much to Yeine's confusion. Being a god, Nahadoth returns to life shortly afterward. Yeine then meets the other gods—and quickly realizes that they, like the Arameri, have frightening plans for her.

Yeine, however, has her own agenda: still in mourning, she has come to Sky to determine who may have killed her mother before the start of the story. While attempting to forge an alliance with Relad, her cousin and the other potential heir, she also seeks out answers to the mystery of her mother's past. This leads Yeine to terrifying revelations about herself, her world's history, and the gods themselves.

As the day of the succession ceremony approaches and Yeine finds herself left with few options, she chooses to ally with the Enefadeh—even though Nahadoth warns her that they want her life in exchange for their assistance. Determined to learn the truth about her mother even if she dies in the process, she agrees to the gods' bargain. She also begins brief liaisons with first T'vril, then Nahadoth himself, the latter of whom seems equally drawn to her, though his motives are unclear.

The story culminates with the Arameri Ceremony of the Succession, at which Itempas himself—the Skyfather, ruler of the universe—appears, and Yeine makes a fateful choice.

== Characters ==
The following main characters appear in the book:

- Yeine – Yeine Darr (the short form of her full name, which is "Yeine dau she Kinneth tai wer Somem kanna Darre") is half Arameri and half Darre. Her mother, formerly the Arameri heir, has been murdered when the story opens, and part of Yeine's goal in the city of Sky is to avenge her death. Yeine is the chieftain, or ennu, of the Darre—an hereditary/figurehead role, though with some representative power. She is considered a barbarian by the Arameri.
- Nahadoth – The Nightlord, otherwise known as the god of night, chaos, and change, is the eldest of the Gods and the most dangerous. He appears in different guises.
- Itempas – The god of law, order, and light, Itempas is worshipped as the Skyfather the world over.
- Enefa – The goddess of twilight, dawn, balance, life, and death, she was murdered several thousand years before the start of the tale.
- Sieh – The Trickster, a godling who chooses to take the form of a nine-year-old boy. In reality he is the eldest of all the godlings, several billion years old. He befriends Yeine for inexplicable reasons.
- Kurue – Another godling, the goddess of wisdom, and the apparent leader of the enslaved gods.
- Zhakkarn – Another godling, the goddess of war and battle.
- Dekarta – As the head of the Arameri family, Dekarta is the "uncrowned" ruler of the Hundred Thousand Kingdoms and Yeine's grandfather. He summons Yeine to Sky at the beginning of the story, and names her one of his heirs.
- Scimina – One of Yeine's cousins, a fellow heir. The apparent primary antagonist of the story.
- Relad – Scimina's younger twin brother and the other potential heir. He is a bitter drunkard, but Yeine's best chance for an alliance in order to survive the contest of heirs.
- T’vril – A half-blood like Yeine, he is the palace steward. He quickly becomes one of Yeine's allies.
- Kinneth – Kinneth was Dekarta's only child, Yeine's mother.
- Viraine – He is the palace scrivener, a scholar who studies the gods' language; this language permits him to work limited magic. He too helps Yeine, though his motives are unclear.

== Reception and awards ==
Year	Award	Result	Ref
2010	Nebula Award for Best Novel	Finalist	
2010	Otherwise Award	Honor List	
2010	Romantic Times Reviewers' Choice Award for Best Epic Fantasy Novel	Finalist	
2011	Crawford Award	Shortlisted	
2011	David Gemmell Award for Best Fantasy Newcomer	Finalist	
2011	Hugo Award for Best Novel	Finalist	
2011	Locus Award for Best First Novel	Won	
2011	Sense of Gender Award in Translation	Won	
2011	World Fantasy Award for Best Novel	Finalist	
