= Searchlight Pictures =

American film and distribution company

Searchlight Pictures, Inc.
- Print logo used since 2023

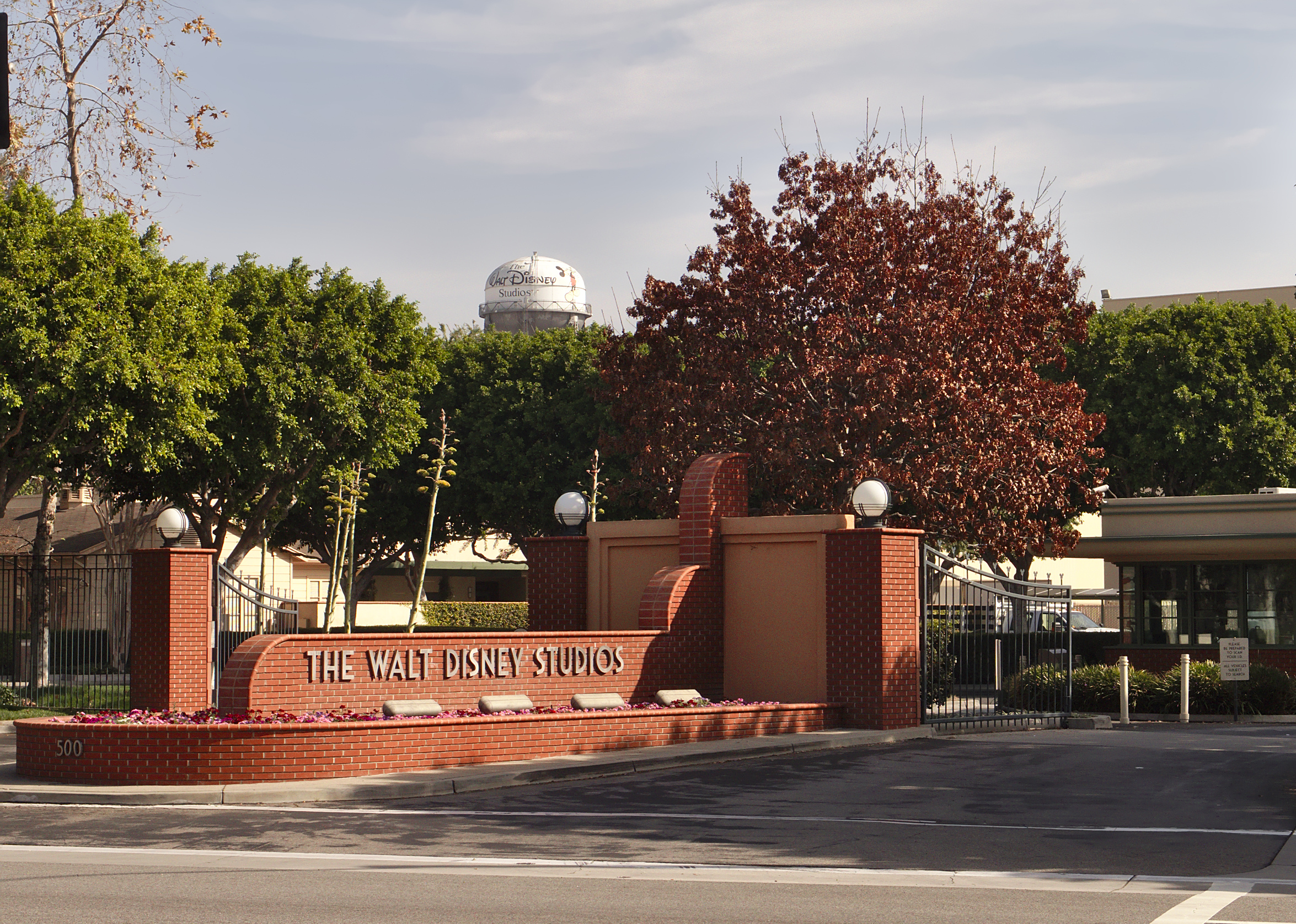
- The Walt Disney Studios' Riverside Drive property in Burbank, California
- Formerly: Fox Searchlight Pictures, Inc. (1994–2020)
- Type: Subsidiary
- Industry: Film
- Founded: April 29, 1994; 32 years ago
- Founder: Tom Rothman
- Headquarters: Walt Disney Studios, Burbank, California, United States
- Area served: Worldwide
- Key people: Matthew Greenfield (president); Derval Whelan (president of distribution)
- Products: Motion pictures
- Number of employees: 101
- Parent: Fox Entertainment Group (1994–2019); Walt Disney Studios (2019–present)
- Divisions: Searchlight Television
- Website: searchlightpictures.com (Note: The original website of Searchlight Pictures "foxsearchlight.com" now redirects to disney.com or its regional affiliates such as disneylatino.com.)

Searchlight Pictures, Inc., formerly known as Fox Searchlight Pictures, is an American film production and distribution company owned by Walt Disney Studios, a division of the Disney Entertainment segment of the Walt Disney Company. Founded on April 29, 1994 as a division of 20th Century Fox (now 20th Century Studios), the studio focuses primarily on producing, distributing, and acquiring independent and specialty films.

Searchlight is most known for distributing the films Slumdog Millionaire, 12 Years a Slave, Birdman, The Shape of Water, and Nomadland, all of which have won the Academy Award for Best Picture. The studio's films has grossed over $5.3 billion worldwide and amassed 51 Academy Awards, 30 Golden Globe Awards, and 56 BAFTA awards. Slumdog Millionaire is the studio's highest-grossing film, with over $377 million (US) of box office receipts, against a production budget of only $15 million.

Searchlight was one of the 21st Century Fox film production units that was acquired by Disney in 2019. The studio's current name was adopted in order to avoid confusion with Fox Corporation. Searchlight is currently one of five live-action film studios within the Walt Disney Studios, alongside Walt Disney Pictures, Marvel Studios, Lucasfilm, and its larger sister unit 20th Century Studios. Compared to 20th Century, whose distribution operations have folded into Walt Disney Studios Motion Pictures, Searchlight retains its autonomous distribution unit.

== History ==
=== Before the creation of Searchlight Pictures ===
Main logo for Fox Searchlight, used from 1997 to 2020.

Prior to the creation of Searchlight Pictures, 20th Century Fox was active in the specialty film market, releasing independent and specialty films under the banner of 20th Century-Fox International Classics, later renamed 20th Century-Fox Specialized Film Division, then TLC Films. The most notable of the releases under these banners include Suspiria, Bill Cosby: Himself, Eating Raoul, The Gods Must Be Crazy, Reuben, Reuben, and Ziggy Stardust and the Spiders from Mars.

In the early 1990s, 20th Century Fox executives decided to emulate the commercial success of Disney's newly acquired Miramax studio. In 1994, Fox announced the formation of a subsidiary that would drive their entry into the specialty film market, and in July that year, they brought in Thomas Rothman, then president of production at The Samuel Goldwyn Company, to head up the new subsidiary. It was soon given the name "Fox Searchlight Pictures", with Rothman as its founding president. The new company inherited the familiar branding elements associated with 20th Century Fox; Fox Searchlight films opened with a production logo consisting of the "Fox Searchlight Pictures" name presented as a large monolith, illuminated by the eponymous searchlights and accompanied by the 20th Century Fox fanfare composed by Alfred Newman.

=== First years and 21st Century Fox era ===
From its first release, The Brothers McMullen (1995), Fox Searchlight went to distribute a series of independent films such as Girl 6, Stealing Beauty, and She's the One (all 1996). While critically well received, these early releases were not commercially successful; Fox Searchlight's first real commercial breakthrough came with The Full Monty (1997), garnering the studio's first awards.

In 2006, a companion label, Fox Atomic, was created to produce and/or distribute genre films. Fox Atomic closed down in 2009.

On June 28, 2012, Rupert Murdoch announced that Fox Searchlight's owner News Corporation would be split into two publishing and media oriented companies: the second News Corporation, which takes on the publishing and Australian broadcasting assets, and 21st Century Fox, which operated Fox Searchlight parent Fox Entertainment Group. Murdoch states that the 21CF name was a way to maintain 20th Century Fox's heritage.

Fox Stage Productions was formed in June 2013. The creation of 21st Century Fox was completed on June 28, 2013. In August 2013, 20CF started a theatrical joint venture with a trio of producers, both film and theater, Kevin McCollum, John Davis and Tom McGrath.

Nancy Utley joined Fox’s Searchlight branch in 1999, and she served in leadership capacities for over 20 years. Gilula and Utley were partnered at Searchlight since 1999 and jointly served as presidents of Searchlight since 2009. They first collaborated on “Boys Don’t Cry,” which was released in 1999 and as of 2018, led the release of 150 Searchlight productions and acquisitions. Under Utley and Gilula, Searchlight received 122 Golden Globe nominations, 159 Oscar nominations, and 40 Oscars, including four Best Picture Awards. Notable films released under Utley’s tenure at Searchlight include Jojo Rabbit, The Favourite, Three Billboards Outside Ebbing, Missouri; The Grand Budapest Hotel, Beasts of the Southern Wild, The Best Exotic Marigold Hotel, Juno, Little Miss Sunshine, Napoleon Dynamite, Boys Don’t Cry, Black Swan, Sideways, The Tree of Life, Nightmare Alley, Slumdog Millionaire, The Shape of Water, 12 Years a Slave, and Nomadland. As of 2018, Searchlight had grossed over $5 billion in worldwide box office sales.

=== Disney era ===
On December 14, 2017, the Walt Disney Company agreed to acquire most assets from 21st Century Fox, including Fox Searchlight, for $52.4 billion. After a bid from Comcast (parent company of NBCUniversal) for $65 billion, Disney counterbid with $71.3 billion. On July 19, 2018, Comcast dropped out of the bid for 21st Century Fox in favor of Sky plc and Sky UK. Eight days later, Disney and 21CF shareholders approved the merger between the two companies. On March 12, 2019, Disney announced it has set to close the Fox deal on March 20. On March 19, 2019, 21st Century Fox spun off the remaining assets – the Fox Broadcasting Company, Fox Television Stations, the Fox News Group (which includes the Fox News Channel), and the domestic operations of Fox Sports – to the new Fox Corporation in preparation for the completion of the sale, which occurred the following day. The following day it was announced that Fox Searchlight Pictures would be situated under The Walt Disney Studios banner and several high profile layoffs occurred.

As of November 2019, FX Networks and Fox Searchlight were assigned to supply Hulu with content. On January 17, 2020, it was announced that the "Fox" name would be dropped from several of the Fox assets that were acquired by Disney, shortening the company's name to "Searchlight Pictures", in order to avoid brand confusion with Fox Corporation.

The then co-chairs Nancy Utley and Steve Gilula stayed on through the transition. In 2021, Utley departed Searchlight Pictures to launch Lake Ellyn Entertainment, and struck a first look deal with Chernin Entertainment. Disney elevated David Greenbaum and Matthew Greenfield, the then-current heads of production. In February 2024, it was announced that David Greenbaum would take over Sean Bailey and Steve Asbell's roles as the new head of Disney Live Action & 20th Century Studios, leaving Greenfield as the sole President of the studio.

In April 2025, Disney announced that it would not renew its lease with Fox Corporation and that it would vacate the Fox Studio Lot in Century City at the end of 2025. As a result, Searchlight relocated to the Walt Disney Studios in Burbank.

== Film library ==
=== Highest-grossing films ===
Rank	Title	Year	Worldwide gross
1	Slumdog Millionaire	2008	$383,825,427
2	Black Swan	2010	$331,266,710
3	The Full Monty	1997	$261,249,383
4	Juno	2007	$231,450,102
5	The Shape of Water	2017	$195,790,794
6	12 Years a Slave	2013	$180,765,061
7	The Descendants	2011	$175,507,800
8	The Grand Budapest Hotel	2014	$163,037,661
9	Three Billboards Outside Ebbing, Missouri	2017	$161,158,351
10	A Complete Unknown	2024	$140,508,652
11	The Best Exotic Marigold Hotel	2011	$134,639,780
12	Poor Things	2023	$117,537,274
13	Sideways	2004	$109,726,800
14	Birdman	2014	$102,926,247
15	Little Miss Sunshine	2006	$100,642,353
16	The Favourite	2018	$95,829,459
17	The Second Best Exotic Marigold Hotel	2015	$89,400,862
18	Jojo Rabbit	2019	$86,878,073
19	28 Days Later	2003	$82,784,517
20	The Menu	2022	$75,820,378
21	Bend It Like Beckham	2002	$74,566,042
22	The Hills Have Eyes	2006	$70,355,813
23	Street Kings	2008	$65,457,811
24	Brooklyn	2015	$62,076,141
25	The Tree of Life	2011	$61,721,826

== Accolades ==
Since 1994, Searchlight Pictures has accumulated 205 Academy Award nominations with 52 wins (including five Best Picture winners since 2009), 117 Golden Globe nominations with 30 wins, 190 BAFTA nominations with 57 wins, 68 Screen Actors Guild Award nominations with 14 wins, 215 Critics Choice Award nominations with 55 wins, and 137 Independent Spirit Awards nominations with 54 wins.

== Related units ==
=== Searchlight Television ===
Searchlight Television is the television production division of Searchlight Pictures. Launched in April 2018, Searchlight Television broadens the variety of projects produced under the Searchlight banner. It is headed by David Greenbaum and Matthew Greenfield.

Both original material and adaptations of Searchlight's existing film library will be produced for cable, streaming and broadcast television, in the form of documentaries, scripted series, limited series and more. In April 2019, the Hulu streaming service ordered The Dropout, starring Amanda Seyfried from Searchlight Television and 20th Television. The studio is also developing an adaptation of the City of Ghosts novel with ABC Signature and an adaptation of N. K. Jemisin's Inheritance Trilogy with Westbrook Studios. In October 2021, Hulu ordered a sequel series to the Mel Brooks film History of the World, Part I from Searchlight Television and 20th Television.

=== Searchlight Shorts ===
In March 2019, the studio launched Searchlight Shorts, a collection of short films that the studio would acquire from upper-tier festivals and release on their YouTube channel. The first two films to be acquired by the studio for this collection were Shelly Lauman's Birdie and Guy Nattiv's Skin, the latter of which won the 2018 Academy Award for Best Live Action Short Film. Other acquisitions for the collection included A. V. Rockwell's Feathers, Matthew Puccini's Lavender, Freddy Macdonald's Sew Torn, Savanah Leaf and Taylor Russell's The Heart Still Hums and Julia Baylis and Sam Guest's Wiggle Room.

== See also ==
- 20th Century Studios
- Touchstone Television
