= The Broken Kingdoms =

Novel by N. K. Jemisin

- First edition cover
- Author: N. K. Jemisin
- Cover artist: Cliff Nielsen
- Language: English
- Series: The Inheritance Trilogy #2
- Genre: Fantasy
- Publisher: Orbit
- Publication date: November 3, 2010
- Publication place: United States
- Pages: 411
- ISBN: 9780316043960
- OCLC: 503596010
- Preceded by: The Hundred Thousand Kingdoms
- Followed by: The Kingdom of Gods

The Broken Kingdoms is a fantasy novel by American writer N. K. Jemisin, the second book of her The Inheritance Trilogy. It takes place ten years after the events of The Hundred Thousand Kingdoms and centers around a young woman named Oree Shoth, who lives in the World Tree-shrouded, godling-inhabited city of Shadow.

== Plot ==
A decade after the events of The Hundred Thousand Kingdoms comes the story of Oree Shoth, a young street artist who lives in the city of Sky, which has been unofficially renamed "Shadow" after the growth of the enormous World Tree. Oree is blind, but has the ability to see magic; she has inherited this sensitivity to magic from her father, who also taught her to conceal her gift, as it is considered heretical by the Order of Itempas. Oree seeks only to live as ordinary a life as possible, despite her unusual abilities and disability.

Shadow is a city in which many "godlings"—immortal, demigod children of the gods—live hidden among the mortal citizens, so Oree is not very surprised to find a downtrodden being who is apparently unconscious, yet glowing brightly to her magic-sight, in the trash-strewn alley behind her house. She takes in this apparently mute homeless man, whom she later whimsically dubs "Shiny", and lives with him without incident for several months. She has no inkling of his identity, suspecting only that he is a godling, though readers familiar with The Hundred Thousand Kingdoms will quickly realize that he is Itempas, god of light and order. Itempas was disgraced and sentenced to humanity by his fellow gods at the end of the previous book.

When one of the local godlings is murdered, Oree finds the body—and falls under suspicion when the Itempan Order seeks a scapegoat rather than the actual culprit. Shiny increases the danger to Oree when, in an apparent fit of pique, he manifests inhuman power and injures, then kills, several Orderkeepers. Madding, another godling denizen of the city and Oree's ex-lover, attempts to aid her. However, he and a number of other godlings, and Oree, are then captured by a heretical group of Itempans who call themselves the Order of the New Light. The New Lights, led by a renegade Arameri fullblood named Serymn and her scrivener husband, Dateh, oppose the Order of Itempas, which has attempted to change mortal society and doctrine in response to the events of the previous novel, which are not widely known. Dateh reveals to Oree that she is a demon, a part-god mortal whose blood is toxic to gods; it is demon blood, which Dateh also bears, that has been used to kill godlings. The gods, led by Itempas, long ago attempted to hunt down and destroy all demons due to the threat they represented, but a few escaped.

Oree is left with no choice but to seek allies from among the gods and the Arameri—although both groups would happily kill or use her for their own purposes—in order to defeat the New Lights before their actions can threaten the entire mortal realm.

== Characters ==
=== Oree Shoth ===
Oree is a street artist who lives in Shadow, eking out a living by selling trinkets and art to souvenirs. She has been blind since birth, and is of the Maroneh, remnants of a people whose continent was destroyed by the Nightlord centuries before.

=== Itempas/"Shiny" ===
After being bound in human form Itempas wandered until Oree took him in. Because of his general contempt for mortal beings, he initially refuses to talk—leading Oree to call him "Shiny" because of the way his magic appears to her.

=== Yeine ===
After the events in The Hundred Thousand Kingdoms, Yeine has taken Enefa's place as one of The Three, the goddess of life and death. To conceal the fact that Enefa has been reborn, the Order of Itempas has dubbed her "the Gray Lady", in an attempt to brand her as a new goddess for the purposes of worship.

=== Nahadoth ===
The god of darkness and change, he is feared throughout the world as the Nightlord. To conceal the fact that he has been set free from his long enslavement by the Arameri, the Order of Itempas has dubbed him "the Lord of Shadows" in an attempt to brand him as a new god for the purposes of worship.

=== Madding ===
The god of obligation, and Oree's former lover. As an openly godly denizen of Shadow, he runs an organization of disaffected mortals and his fellow godlings, who trade in illegal magic and godsblood, a narcotic.

=== Lil ===
The goddess of hunger, another godling who lives in Shadow.

=== Sieh ===
The Trickster and god of childhood, one of the godlings formerly enslaved by the Arameri. Now free, he visits the mortal realm only to torment Itempas.

=== Dateh/Nypri ===
Dateh is a scrivener, a licensed user of magic, who abandoned the Order of Itempas. He is the husband of Serymn.

=== Serymn Arameri ===
An Arameri fullbood who defected from the family following her belief that they'd perverted the way of Itempas.

== Reception ==
The book received a Romantic Times Reviewers' Choice Award for Fantasy (2010).

Joshua S. Hill, of Fantasy Book Review, gave it a 9 out of 10, stating "This book manages to weave together grand themes in the true style of high fantasy literature with a very personal and relatable story, full of unease and fear and sadness, joy and pleasure".
