= Searchlight Television =

Television arm of Searchlight Pictures

Searchlight Television, LLC
- Type: Division
- Industry: Television
- Founded: April 11, 2018; 8 years ago
- Founders: David Greenbaum; Matthew Greenfield
- Headquarters: Walt Disney Studios, Burbank, California, U.S.
- Products: Miniseries; Television shows; Television documentaries
- Parent: Searchlight Pictures

Searchlight Television, LLC is the television arm of Searchlight Pictures, a subsidiary of the Walt Disney Studios, a sub-division of the Disney Entertainment business segment of the Walt Disney Company. Founded on April 11, 2018, it seeks to broaden the variety of projects produced under the namesake Searchlight Pictures film banner. It is headed by Matthew Greenfield.

Both original material and adaptations of Searchlight's existing film library will be produced for cable, streaming and broadcast television, in the form of documentaries, scripted series, limited series and more. In April 2019, the Hulu streaming service ordered The Dropout, starring Amanda Seyfried from Searchlight Television and 20th Television. The studio is also developing an adaptation of the City of Ghosts novel with ABC Signature and an adaptation of N. K. Jemisin's Inheritance Trilogy with Westbrook Studios. In October 2021, Hulu ordered a sequel series to the Mel Brooks film History of the World, Part I from Searchlight Television and 20th Television.

== Filmography ==
Year	Title	Network	Notes	Ref.
2022	The Dropout	Hulu	with Elizabeth Meriwether Pictures, Semi-Formal Productions, and 20th Television	
2023	History of the World, Part II	Hulu	with Good at Bizness, Inc., 23/34, Brooksfilms Limited and 20th Television	
2023	The Full Monty	FX on Hulu (U.S); Disney+ (U.K)	with Little Island Productions, New Wave Films and FX Productions	
2024	La Máquina	Hulu	with La Corriente del Golfo and Nine and a Half Fingers, Inc.	
2026	Furious	Hulu	with Composition 8, Elizabeth Meriwether Pictures and 20th Television	
TBA	Anything Factory	HBO Max		
TBA	Razzlekhan: The Infamous Crocodile of Wall Street	Hulu	with Vox Media Studios	
TBA	Untitled City of Ghosts series	TBA	with 20th Television	
TBA	Untitled Inheritance Trilogy series	TBA	with Westbrook	
TBA	Untitled Sundance Institute series	Hulu	with 51 Entertainment, Truckstop Media, Proximity Media and Loveless and Monroe	
