= The Inheritance Trilogy (Jemisin series) =

Fantasy series written by N. K. Jemisin

- The Hundred Thousand Kingdoms (2010); The Broken Kingdoms (2010); The Kingdom of Gods (2011); "The Awakened Kingdom" (2014); Shades in Shadow (2015)
- Author: N. K. Jemisin
- Cover artist: Cliff Nielsen
- Country: United States
- Language: English
- Genre: Fantasy
- Publisher: Orbit Books (United States)
- Published: 2010–2011
- Media type: Print (hardcover and paperback), audiobook, e-book
- No. of books: 3

The Inheritance Trilogy is a fantasy trilogy written by American author N. K. Jemisin and published by Orbit Books. The trilogy consists of The Hundred Thousand Kingdoms that won the Locus Award for Best First Novel and was nominated for the World Fantasy Award; followed by The Broken Kingdoms and The Kingdom of Gods.

After the original trilogy, Jemisin published additional stories in the series. "The Awakened Kingdom" was a sequel novella published in the 2014 omnibus edition of The Inheritance Trilogy. Shades in Shadow was released as a 2015 ebook triptych of short stories, including a prequel to the trilogy: "The Wild Boy", "The God Without a Name", and "The Third Why".

== Characters ==
=== Yeine ===
Yeine is half-Arameri and half-Darr. She is small with curly hair, and can sometimes be taken for a boy. She's the chieftain, or ennu, of the Darre, which is a matriarchal society of warriors (reminiscent of the Amazons), until she is made a potential heir to the Arameri throne and put in charge of three other countries, all of which are bigger than Darre. Because of her bluntness and Darre manners, she is called a barbarian by the Arameri.

Yeine is a resilient, independent woman. She's learned to mask her emotions from the Darre people, but cannot fake friendliness and affection for those she does not like. She loathes the Arameri family, but will use Arameri tactics to protect those she loves. She treats the Enefadeh with respect unlike most of her kinsmen.

Because Enefa's soul is within her body, she can hear the goddess' voice and see visions. Even though everyone, including Nahadoth, expects Enefa's soul to overtake her own, her soul defeats Enefa's and she replaces the goddess with Enefa's blessing.

N.K. Jemisin's character study names her as impulsive and irrational (she obsesses over her mother's murder even when she has other things to worry about), and not above hurting herself to get what she needs.

=== Nahadoth ===
Nahadoth is the Nightlord, otherwise known as the god of night, chaos, and change. He was the first of the gods to exist. When Itempas murdered Enefa, he led his children in revolt against him, and was forced into a mortal body as a punishment. By day, he is "Naha," a tortured human. By night, however, he is free to become something close to what he once was. Nahadoth is shaped by the thoughts and expectations of those around him.

He is the father of Sieh, and loves Enefa, Itempas and later Yeine.

=== Bright Itempas ===
The god of law, order, light, and rules, Bright Itempas came after Nahadoth and though at first they fought, they later became lovers. He kills Enefa and imprisons Nahadoth and his children, but offers the Nightlord a chance to be free and serve him every time a new Arameri ruler is chosen.

He is worshipped as the Skyfather by the Arameri people, who imposed him on all the peoples they conquered and declared all who remembered Nahadoth and the others as heretics.

=== Enefa ===
The goddess of twilight, dawn, balance, life, and death, she came third of the Three. She was the one who created life. Sieh was her firstborn. From the beginning, Nahadoth delighted in her creations, but Itempas didn't because he disliked change. She loves both Nahadoth and Bright Itempas, and Sieh obviously longs for her to love him like a mother. She seemingly has no choice but to love her children, but is also feared by them. When she is murdered, Itempas keeps a part of her soul, trapped in the Stone, and the rest is gathered and placed into Yeine by the Enefadeh.

=== Sieh ===
The Trickster god, he is the firstborn of Nahadoth and Enefa. A perpetual child, with a child's cleverness and a child's cruelty, he has bright green eyes and a falsely innocent demeanor. Sieh has chosen the path of a child, and therefore despite his age he can't stop loving and longing for a mother. Yeine notices at one point that when he is intent on something, he doesn't blink. In Sky, the Arameri palace, he possesses a room full of multi-colored orbs that are actually a sun and planets stolen from various other solar systems.

=== Kurue ===
The goddess of wisdom, she betrays the Enefadeh's plan to Itempas. She is described as very beautiful, with gold and silver wings, though she takes the form of a plump, old librarian when she first appears to Yeine. Yeine kills her after she replaces Enefa.

=== Zhakkarn ===
The goddess of war and battle, she is huge, and described as taller kneeling than Sieh standing. Like Kurue and Sieh, she is another of Nahadoth's children, and the one to mark Yeine so that she'll be free from Arameri control. Yeine earns her respect after she kills Kurue.

=== Dekarta ===
The ruler of the Arameri and Yeine's grandfather, he offered his wife to transfer the Stone to him, which killed her and alienated his daughter, Kinneth. Despite this he continues to love his daughter, and always hoped for her return. In N.K. Jemisin's character study, she reveals that Dekarta blames Yeine for taking Kinneth from him.

=== Scimina ===
One of the potential heirs and a cousin once-removed from Yeine, Scimina is a cruel, half-mad woman with no conscience whatsoever. She sets Nahadoth on Yeine the first time she meets her and threatens to destroy Darre if she isn't named as heir. She sits at Dekarta's right hand at the Council, and is described as “a reedy Amn beauty of sable hair, patrician features, and regal grace.”

=== Relad ===
Scimina's younger twin brother and the other potential heir, Relad surrounds himself with his vices. He knows if he aligns with Yeine his sister will kill him.

=== T'vril ===
A half-blood like Yeine, he is the palace steward and a good man who takes care of the servants and cares for Yeine. He was part Amn and part Ken, and gets his red-colored hair from his Ken side. His Amn father was also Relad and Scimina's older brother. T'vril is said to be just as smart as Scimina or Relad. Yeine orders Dekarta to name him heir after she takes Enefa's place.

=== Viraine ===
The palace Scrivener—or scholar of the gods—he claims to have been Kinneth's friend and offers to befriend Yeine. Yeine doesn't trust him, and later figures out that he was her mother's lover and that she used him to learn the truth about her mother's death.

== Geography ==
=== Darre ===
A matriarchal society, Darre is made of tribes and ruled by the ennu, which happens to be Yeine. Darre publicly rescinded their faith in Nahadoth and the Enefadeh when they were conquered by the Arameri, but still worship them in secret. The men in Darre are trophies, and used basically to sire children, though many couples, such as Kinneth and Yeine's father, are deeply in love.

The Darre have a brutal coming-of-age ceremony, in which the young woman has to survive in the forest for a month, and then return home to fight publicly with a man her sponsor has chosen. She will either win and control the sex that follows, or be brutally raped.

Usually, the sponsor chooses a weak man, but because the Darre people don't trust Yeine's Amn blood, her grandmother chooses the strongest warrior. Yeine fights as best she can, fulfills the ceremony, and then kills her rapist with a rock afterwards, effectively claiming her right to rule.

The Darre people are said to have dark skin, straight hair, and lush curves. In the words of the author, "the closest racial analogue for the Darre, if they were in our world, would be South American Indian, specifically Inka."

=== Sky ===
The city of Sky is sprawled over a small mountain and completely white. The Palace, which is also called Sky and where the majority of the story takes place, was built by the gods and sits above the earth, floating in the sky. In Sky (the city), there is the Salon, a white-walled building where the Consortium (world council) meets to pretend that they aren't all just obeying the Arameri.

=== Gateway Park ===
A park built around Sky and the World Tree's base.

=== Sky in Shadow ===
Official name for the palace of the Arameri and the city beneath it.

=== The Gray ===
The "Middle City" of sky in shadow, situated atop the World Trees roots. Includes, servants, suppliers, and crafters, and the mansions they serve (which encircle the Tree's trunk) by means of a network of steam-driven escalators.

=== Antema ===
Capital of the largest province of the Teman Protectorate.

=== Amn ===
The most populous and powerful race, ruled by the Arameri, who indirectly rule the Senmite races by "advising" the Nobles Consortium, (world council), and the Order of Itempas (Itempas priests). Though they possess many armies and are a powerful nation in their own right, the reason the Amn people rose to power was largely due to the priestess, Shahar Arameri, who helped Itempas kill Enefa and whose offspring were therefore granted the Enefadeh as weapons.

The Amn people are said to be tall with sable hair.

=== The Islands ===
To the east of Senm, a volcanic archipelago. Easternmost portions of the archipelago were close to the Maroland, and the people of those islands have a markedly different culture, darker skin, and curlier hair than those of the western islands.

- Ken: Largest of the islands, at the western end of the chain.
- Irt: Nation occupying half of a largish island.
- Uthr: Nation occupying the other half of the Irtin island.

=== The Maroland ===
Lost continent, once to the southeast of High North. Smallest continent. Climate was subtropical-to-temperate. A place of great beauty and biodiversity; the first humans evolved here, then spread westward. The first Arameri home city was here, before the continent was destroyed by Nahadoth. For several centuries afterward the area where the Maroland had been was prone to underwater earthquakes/tsunami that made sea travel treacherous. Colloquially called “Maro”.

== Races/Clans ==
=== Godly Races ===
==== The Maelstrom ====
The origin of all things. The Maelstrom is the force, or entity, that gave birth to the Three. It has never communicated with any of its children, and not even the gods fully understand its nature. Yeine perceives it during her lovemaking with Nahadoth in The Hundred Thousand Kingdoms as “a sound: a titanic, awful roar.” The gods describe it as a churning storm, not just of energy or matter but of concepts as well. Most godlings, demons, or mortals who approach too closely are torn apart by its raging power.

==== Gods ====
The creator entities of the Inheritance Trilogy. Gods are equally at home as corporeal or incorporeal beings, are able to travel virtually anywhere in creation, and have complete power over all material and metaphysical objects and concepts. Only three gods exist at the beginning of the trilogy: Nahadoth, Itempas, and Enefa. Enefa was murdered by Itempas, and eventually replaced by Yeine. Individually the gods are extremely powerful, but not omnipotent or omniscient. Only the Three acting in concert have absolute power, rivaled only by the Maelstrom.

==== Godlings ====
Godlings are immortal children of either the Three or other godlings, or some combination thereof. Each has an affinity and antithesis, and all possess the ability to travel anywhere and manipulate matter, including their own bodies. Beyond this, their powers vary widely per individual. Godlings exist in three rankings: niwwah, elontid, and mnasat. In The Kingdom of Gods, Sieh defines the demons as a fourth ranking, but notes that they are all (to his knowledge) dead.

Niwwah: The first ranking of godlings, born of the Three; the Balancers. More stable but sometimes less powerful than the elontid.

Elontid: The second ranking of godling. The Imbalancers, born of the inequality between gods and godlings or the instability of Nahadoth and Itempas.Sometimes as powerful as gods, sometimes weaker than godlings.

Mnasat: The third ranking of godlings; godlings born of godlings. Generally weaker than godlings born of the Three.

===== List of Godlings =====
Godlings named thus far include:

- Sieh the Trickster: One of the Enefadeh; god of childhood/mischief/innocence/caprice. A child of Nahadoth and Enefa. Niwwah.
- Zhakkarn of the Blood: One of the Enefadeh; goddess of battle. A child of Nahadoth and Enefa. Niwwah.
- Kurue the Wise: One of the Enefadeh; goddess of wisdom. A child of Itempas and Enefa. Niwwah.
- Madding: A child of Itempas and Enefa; god of obligation, murdered by the New Lights. Niwwah.
- Role: A child of Nahadoth and Enefa; goddess of compassion, murdered by the New Lights. Niwwah.
- Lil the Hunger: A child of Nahadoth and Itempas; goddess of hunger. Elontid.
- Nemmer: A child of Nahadoth and Enefa; goddess of secrets. Niwwah.
- Paitya: One of Madding's lieutenants; affinity and parentage unknown. Murdered by the New Lights.
- Kitr: One of Madding's lieutenants; affinity and parentage unknown. Mnasat.
- Dump: “The Lord of Discards”; affinity and parentage unknown. Murdered by the New Lights.
- Nahadoth's Shadow/Hado/Ahad: A child of Nahadoth, with some assistance from Yeine; god of love.
- Eyem-Sutah: God of commerce; affinity and parentage unknown.
- Egan: A godling who now works in the Arms of Night; affinity and parentage unknown.
- Selforine: A former lover of Sieh. Affinity and parentage unknown.
- Elishad: A former lover of Sieh. Affinity and parentage unknown.
- Nsana: A former lover of Sieh. A child of Nahadoth and Enefa; god of dreams.
- Spider: A former lover of Sieh. A child of Nahadoth and Enefa. Affinity unknown, though she is a prophet, able to see the future.
- Kahl: A child of Sieh and Enefa; god of vengeance. Elontid.

=== Mortal Races ===
Or more specifically, human races. There are many sentient species in the universe, though only one matters for the Inheritance Trilogy. Below are the relevant subgroups of humankind:

- Darre - Primary ethnic group of the barony of Darr, on the High North continent. A small population of ethnic Mencheyev also inhabit Darr, and many Darre are at least partially descended from other ethnic groups conquered or captured during the nation's warrior past. Matriarchial/egalitarian, ruled by a council of respected elders with a young warrior as their figurehead (the ennu). Darre tend toward short stature and deep-chestedness. They have brown skin and long black or brown hair; many Darre also have epicanthic-fold eyes. Like most High Northers, they may be a distant offshoot of the Tema people. According to the author they resemble South American Indians from our world.
- Amn - Primary ethnic group of most nations on the Senm continent. Amn have white skin but varying hair and eye colors and morphology, legacy of their past as nomadic barbarians raiding and conquering other ethnic groups. Egalitarian, ruled by the Arameri family, the Nobles’ Consortium, and the Order of Itempas. Amn once spoke many languages, but since the Gods’ War they speak only Senmite.
- Maroneh - Primary ethnic group of Nimaro,. Maroneh have black to dark brown skin and brown or black hair; their hair has a natural tight coil. There were once over 100 separate ethnicities in the Maroland, but the survivors of the Maroland's sinking have become a single group calling themselves Maro’n’neh, or “those who mourn Maro”.
- Ken - Most populous of the island races, in the east. Known for their seafaring and shipbuilding. Generally pale-skinned and tall, with brown or red hair. Their language is Kenti. Offshoot races of the Ken include the Irtin and the Uthre.
- Min - An island race. Known for their seacraft and piracy.
- Teman - The people of the Teman Protectorate, a collection of several smaller nations which act as a union. They are ruled by the Triadice. Temans are of moderate height, generally have black or brown hair, and have brown skin of varying shades. Most Temans wear their hair in “cable locks” — long locks of hair which have been bound together until the hair fibers fuse. Wealthy Temans decorate their hair with jewels and wire made of precious metal; poorer Temans use found objects (e.g., seashells). Tema's capitol, Antema, is the oldest city in the world, and the only city to survive the Gods’ War intact.
- Tokken - A High North race. Fierce warriors, patriarchial.
- Uthre - The people of the island kingdom of Uthr. Conquered the neighboring land of Irt in a bloodless conquest that was later approved by the Nobles’ Consortium. The Uthre resemble the Ken.
- Narshes - A High North race. Their nation was conquered centuries ago; they exist as a minority in several High Northern countries.
- Irti - The people of the island kingdom of Irt. Irt was annexed by the neighboring land of Uthr in a bloodless conquest that was later approved by the Nobles’ Consortium. The Irti resemble the Ken.

=== The Demon Race ===
Demons, in the world of the Hundred Thousand Kingdoms, are the offspring of a mating between gods and humans. They are mortal, like humans, and for the most part resemble humans, though there are some cases of demons bearing visible “deformities” as a marker of their inhuman heritage. (An example is Oree Shoth's eyes, which are specialized to see magic but incapable of seeing anything else.) Since nearly all mortal humans have gods somewhere in their lineage, the designation of “demon” refers to degree of godly heritage — generally only those who are 1/8th god or greater. Some mortals with more distant godly heritage are also deemed demons if they are throwbacks in some way. They must possess the three traits which mark a demon:

1. Abnormally powerful (for a mortal) magical abilities
2. Unusually long lifespan (averaging 200 years)
3. “Toxic blood”; the blood of demons is a deadly poison to gods if ingested or otherwise inserted into the god's corporeal body.

The discovery of this last trait, the demons’ deadly blood, caused their downfall as the gods then turned on them and hunted them to near extinction. Only a few demon lineages now survive, in secret and sometimes unknown even to themselves. The only known demons at the time of the Inheritance Trilogy include Oree Shoth, her father (deceased), her daughter Glee Shoth, Itempan priest and scrivener Dateh Lorillalia, Shahar Arameri the younger, Dekarta Arameri the younger, and Remath Arameri. Sieh and Itempas also remember Shinda Arameri, Itempas’ first demon child (deceased).

Little is known of the age before the Demon War — that period in which they lived and walked freely among the realms. There were possibly thousands of them at the height of this age.

In many cultures demons were hailed as mortal gods due to their great magical abilities. They were generally regarded as more approachable than “pure” gods. In The Broken Kingdoms Appendix 2, Nemue Sarfith Enulai speaks of Yiho of the Shoth Clan — a daughter of Enefa, and likely an ancestor of Oree Shoth — who created salmonlike river fish to feed her countrymen during a famine. As a result of this and other boons provided by the demons, many mortals helped to hide their local demons when the gods turned on them. In the Maroland, demons became a special class of bodyguard-historians called enulai, who helped to guard and guide the royal family of the various Maro peoples until the Maroland's destruction.

Most demons were the descendants of Nahadoth via hundreds of mortal men and women, though godlings parented many as well. The goddess Enefa bore comparatively few demon children, as carrying these children made her unwell (a warning of their deadly blood). The god Itempas is known to have fathered only two demons: Shinda Arameri, son of Shahar Arameri; and Glee Shoth, daughter of Oree Shoth.

== Adaptations ==
=== Film and television ===
In March 2021, Searchlight Television and Westbrook Studios announced the development of a live-action series based on the book.
