= Fox Innovation Lab =

Fox's research & development division

The Fox Innovation Lab was Twentieth Century Fox's research and development center, located in Los Angeles. Working across all film and television divisions, the lab was created in 2014 as a hub for Fox's short- and long-term projects aimed at producing new consumer technologies and experiences. Hanno Basse, CTO, Twentieth Century Fox and Danny Kaye, Executive Vice President, global research and technology strategy, co-managed the Lab. In March 2019, Fox was acquired by Disney, and Fox laid off about 4,000 employees, including both Basse and Kaye.

The Lab was focused on 4K Ultra HD with HDR, TV, digital content user interfaces, and mobile content delivery systems. Announced at the IFA consumer electronics show in Berlin in September 2014, Samsung was the Lab's first commercial partner.

In 2016, The Fox Innovation Lab released The Martian VR Experience, a virtual reality experience based on the 2015 film The Martian, that was executive produced by Ridley Scott and Joel Newton and directed by Robert Stromberg. The Martian VR debuted at CES 2016 and was then accepted into the New Frontier Program at the Sundance Film Festival. The project also received a Cannes Silver Lion in Digital Craft as well as the Association of Independent Commercial Producers (AICP) Next VR Award.

As an outgrowth of the Lab’s VR work, Fox in 2017 launched a new business unit, FoxNext, which not only worked on VR and AR, but also on location-based entertainment and gaming. In March 2018, Kaye said that while the Lab was initially a studio-only endeavor, based on its early successes its scope has since expanded to work across the entire 21st Century Fox company, from Fox Sports to FX Networks, from the Fox Networks Group to National Geographic. In January 2020, FoxNext was sold to Scopely.
