= The History of the World (Raleigh) =

1607 historical work by Walter Raleigh

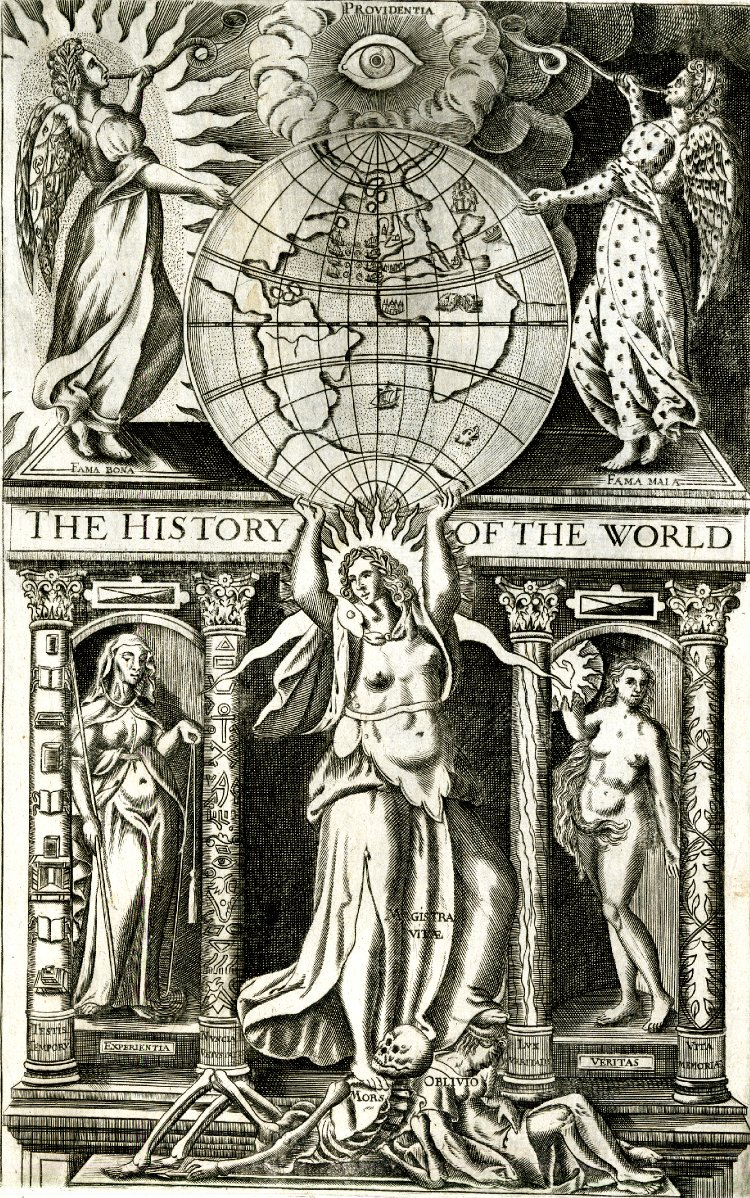
Title page (1614), 283 x 179 mm

The History of the World (originally The Historie of the VVorld / In Five Bookes) is an incomplete work of history by Sir Walter Raleigh, begun in about 1607 whilst the author was imprisoned in the Tower of London, and first published in 1614. It covers the course of human history from Genesis to the conquest of Macedon by Rome. Raleigh intended to write more volumes relating the rise and fall of the great empires, but his release in 1615, his expedition to Guiana, and ultimately his execution in 1618 prevented the accomplishment of his plan. According to Edmund Gosse, "This huge composition is one of the principal glories of seventeenth-century literature, and takes a very prominent place in the history of English prose."

== History ==
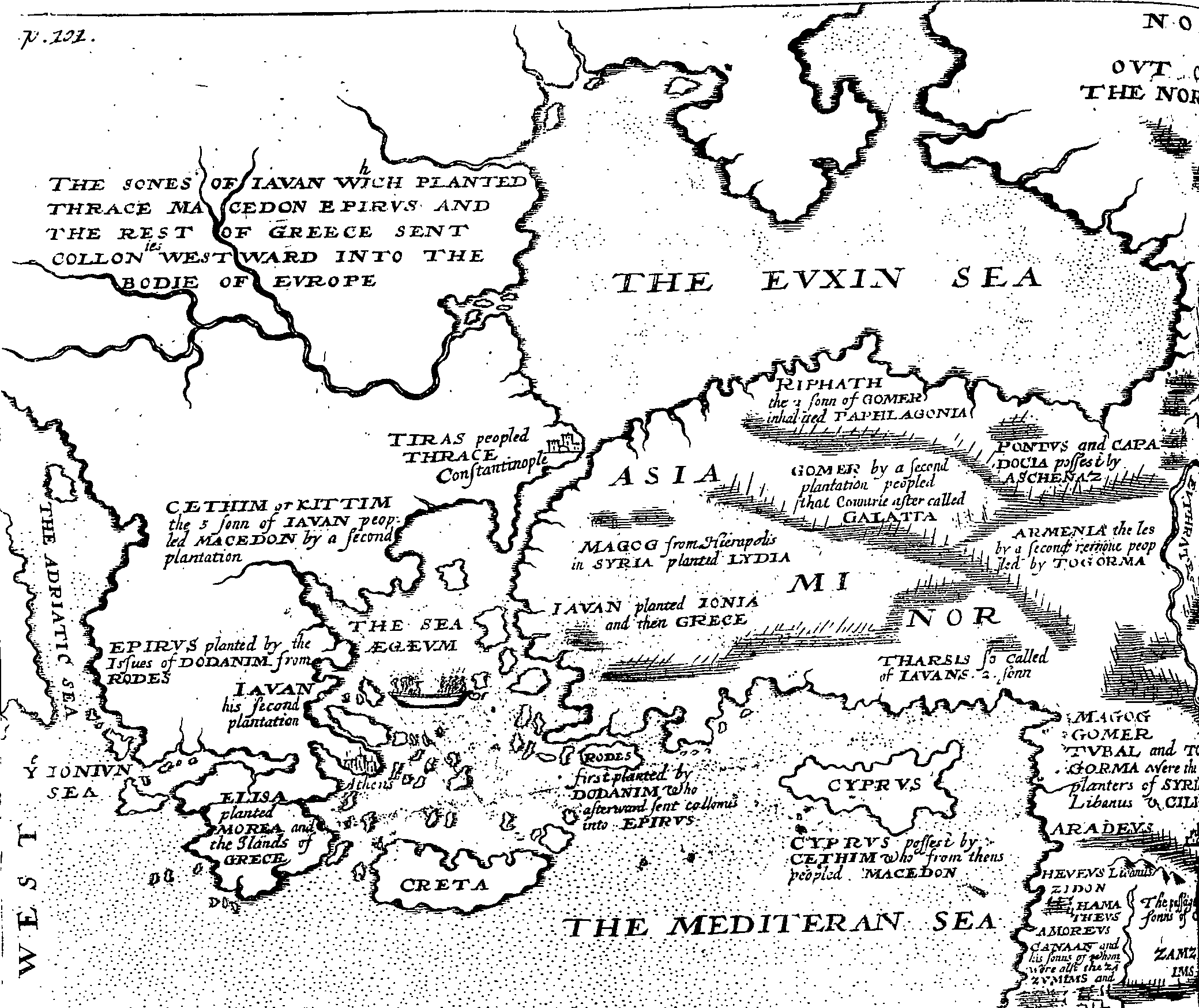
Map of Greece and the ancient Near East (1736)

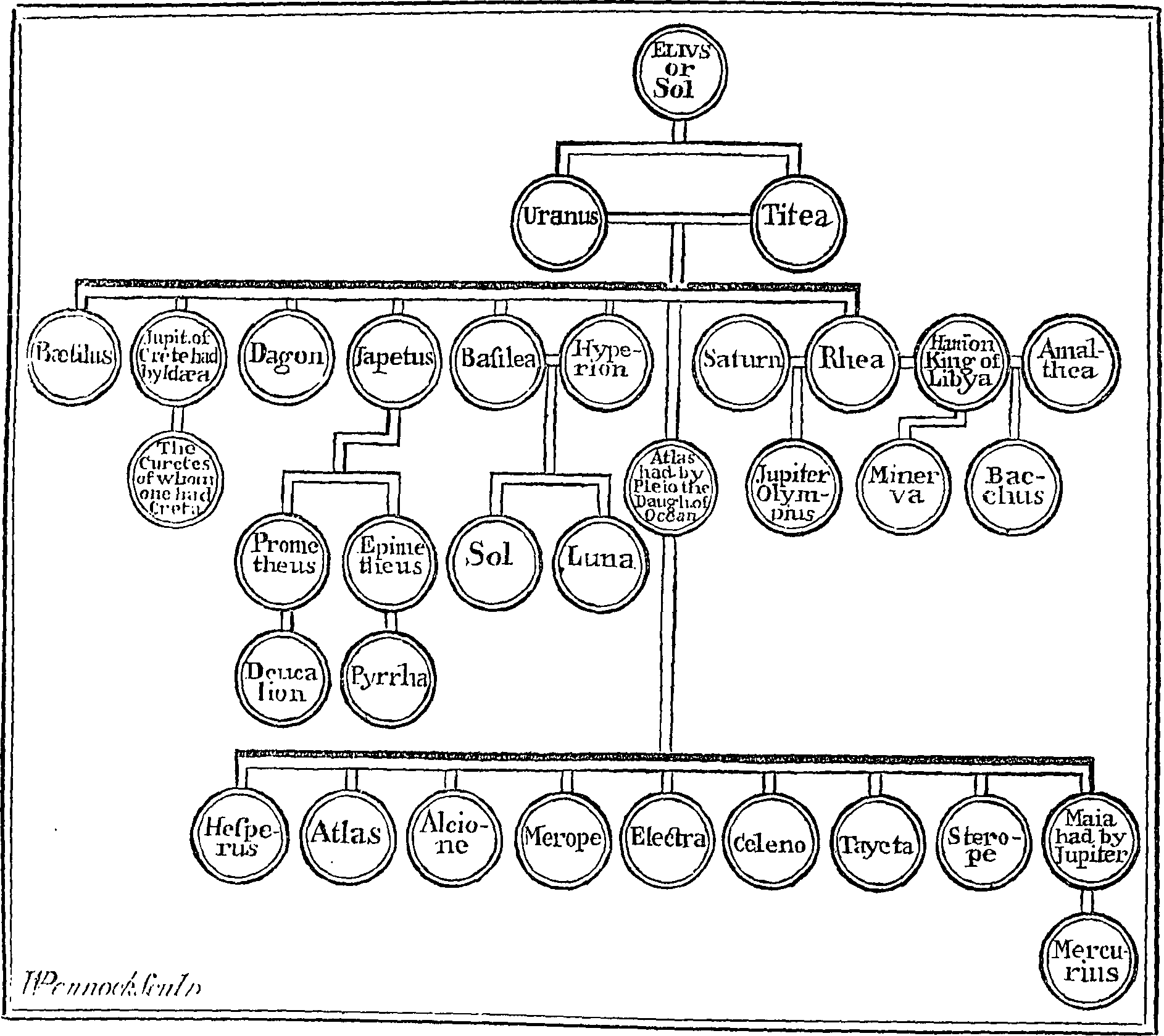
Family tree of the Graeco-Roman deities (1736)

This work, which was done by the author during his twelve years' imprisonment in the Tower of London, was begun probably in 1607, and published, under the care of Ben Jonson, in March 1614. This was only the first, though it remained the last, volume of a work which Raleigh intended should consist of at least three tomes, yet this one instalment contains 1354 folio pages. It passed through eight editions, in less time than it took for the plays of Shakespeare to attain four. In 1615 King James ordered the whole impression called in, giving as his reason that it was "too saucy in censuring the acts of princes".

== Contents ==
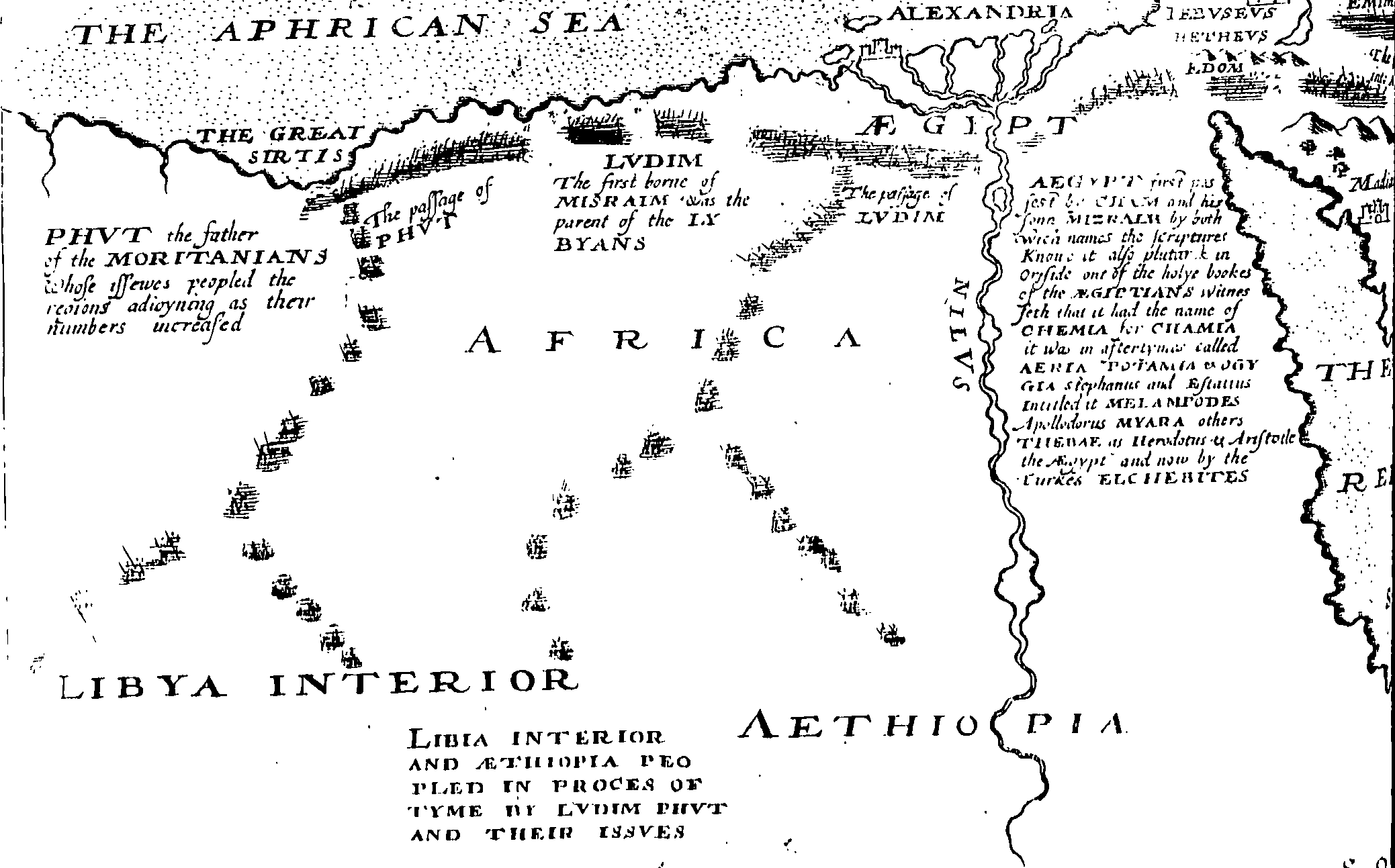
Map of North Africa (1736)

The history is divided into five books: the first covering the time from the Creation to Abraham; the second from the Birth of Abraham to the destruction of the Temple of Solomon; the third from the Destruction of Jerusalem to the time of Philip of Macedon; the fourth from the Reign of Philip to the death of Pyrrhus; the fifth, from the Reign of Antigonus to the Conquest of Asia and Macedon by the Romans. There are many digressions: one, "wherein is maintained the liberty of using conjectures in history"; another, "Of the Several Commandments of the Decalogue"; and another on "Tyranny".

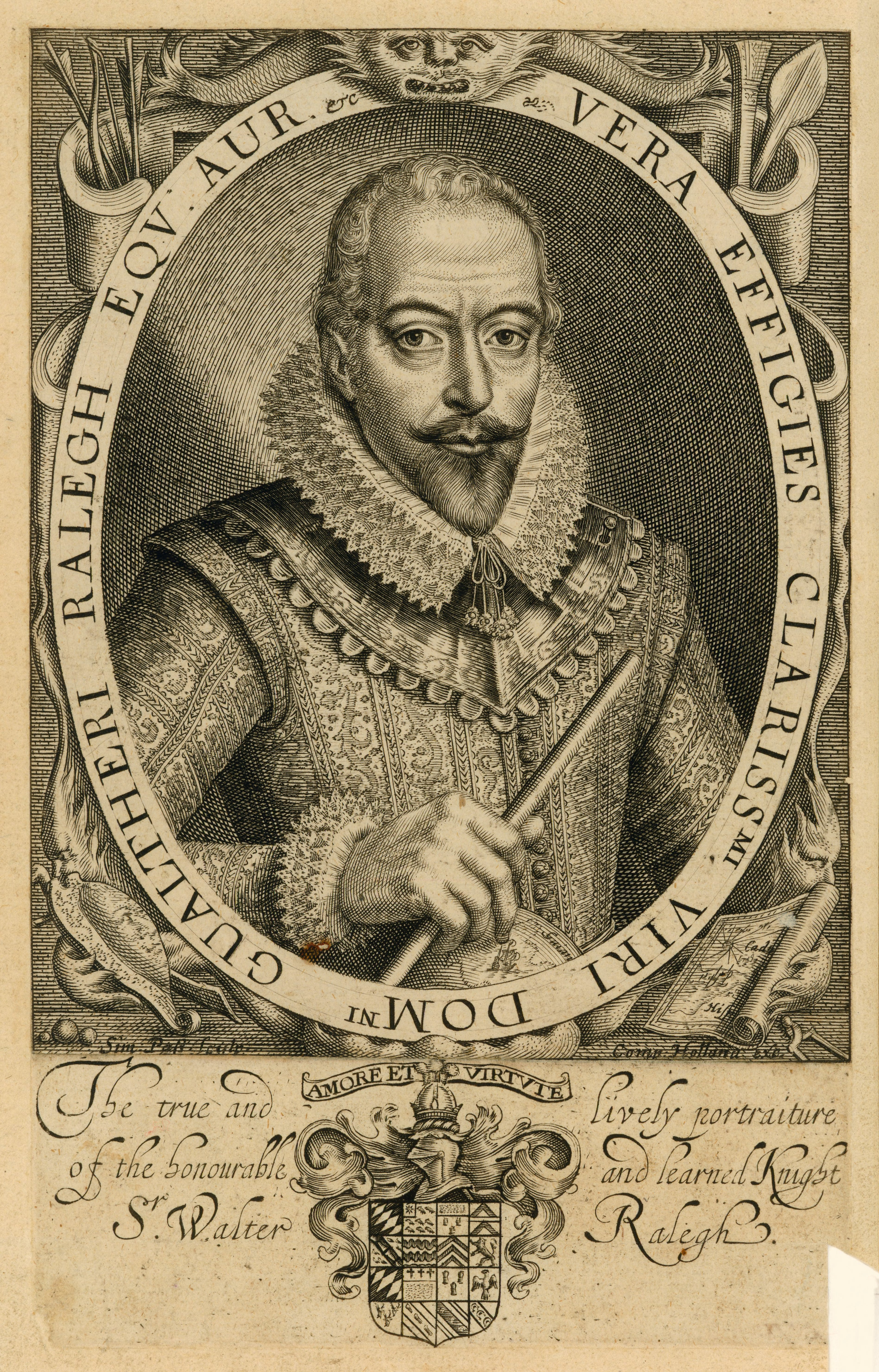
Plate by Simon van de Passe; used as the frontispiece to the third edition of Raleigh's History of the World in 1617.

In the preface the author speaks of a second and third volume "if the first receive grace and good acceptance". It was his ambition to relate the successive fortunes of the four great empires of the world, by way of a preface to the History of England; but his release from imprisonment in 1615, his expedition to Guiana, and his execution in 1618, prevented the accomplishment of his plan.

== Appraisal ==
Edmund Gosse gives the following appraisal of the History of the World: "He [Raleigh] indites a large matter, and it is in a broad and serious style. The Preface, perhaps, leads the reader to expect something more modern, more entertaining than he finds. It is not easy to sympathise with a historian who confutes Steuchius Eugubinus and Goropius Becanus at great length, especially as those flies now exist only in the amber of their opponent. But the narrative, if obsolete and long-winded, possesses an extraordinary distinction, and, in its brighter parts, is positively resplendent. The book, is full of practical wisdom, knowledge of men in the mass, and trenchant study of character. It is heavy and slow in movement, the true historical spirit, as we now conceive it, is absent, and it would probably baffle most readers to pursue its attenuated thread of entertainment down to the triumph of Emilius Paulus. But of its dignity there can be no two opinions, and in sustained power it easily surpassed every prose work of its own age."

== Sources ==
- Cust, Lionel (1919). "The Portraits of Sir Walter Ralegh". The Volume of the Walpole Society, 8. pp. 9–10.
- Keller, Helen Rex (1924). "History of the World, A". The Reader's Digest of Books. (The Library of the World's Best Literature). New York: The Macmillan Company. pp. 404–405.

Attribution:

- Gosse, Edmund (1893). "Sir Walter Raleigh". Craik, Henry (ed.). English Prose Selections. Vol. 1. New York and London: Macmillan and Co. pp. 527–532.
