= A History of the World (disambiguation) =

A History of the World is a six-volume history of the world in Hungarian, published between 1906 and 1908. The title may also refer to:

- The History of the World (Raleigh), an unfinished work of history by Sir Walter Raleigh, published in 1614
- A History of the World in 10½ Chapters, a work of fiction by Julian Barnes, published in 1989
- A History of the World in the 20th Century, a history textbook by J. A. S. Grenville, first published in 1994
- A History of the World in 100 Objects, a joint project of BBC Radio 4 and the British Museum, published in 2010
- A History of the World in Seven Cheap Things, a book by Raj Patel and Jason W. Moore, published in 2018

== See also ==
- History of the world (disambiguation)
