= Chronicon Paschale =

7th-century Greek Christian chronicle

- Ἐπίτομὴ χρόνων τῶν ἀπὸ Ἀδάμ τοῦ πρωτοπλάστου ἀνθρώπου ἕως ιζ' ἔτους τῆς βασιλείας Ἡρακλείου
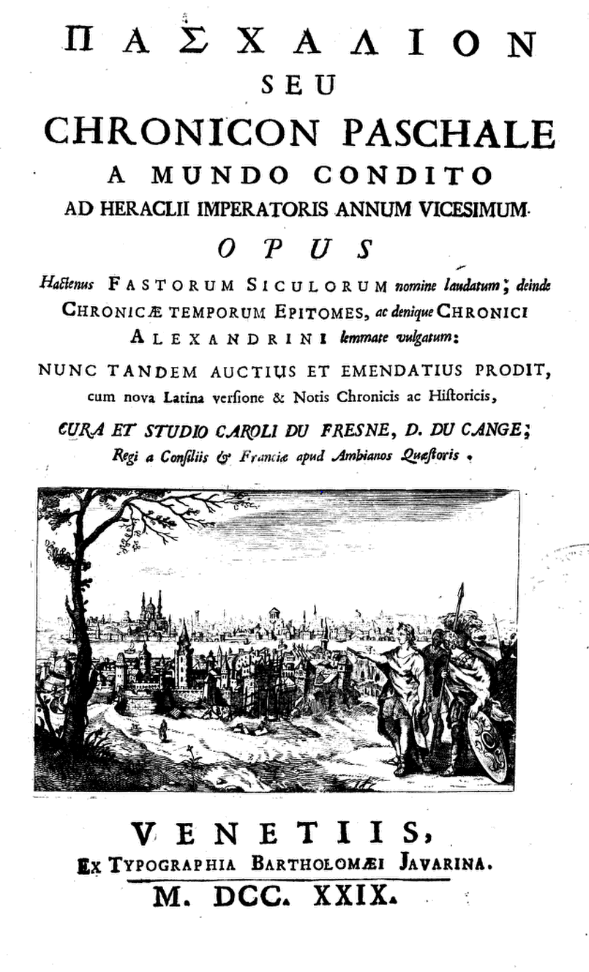
- Title page of a 1729 edition of the Chronicon Paschale
- Full title: Epitome of the ages from Adam the first man to the 17th year of the reign of the most August Heraclius
- Also known as: Chronicum Alexandrinum, Chronicum Constantinopolitanum, Fasti Siculi, Paschal Chronicle, Easter Chronicle
- Author(s): Anonymous
- Language: Medieval Greek
- Date: c. 630
- Manuscript(s): Codex Vaticanus graecus 1941 (10th century)
- Genre: Chronicle
- Subject: Universal history, Christian chronology
- Period covered: Creation to AD 628
- Sources: Eusebius of Caesarea, John Malalas, Sextus Julius Africanus

Chronicon Paschale (the Paschal or Easter Chronicle), also called Chronicum Alexandrinum, Constantinopolitanum or Fasti Siculi, is the conventional name of a 7th-century Greek Christian chronicle of the world. Its name comes from its system of chronology based on the Christian paschal cycle; its Greek author named it Epitome of the ages from Adam the first man to the 17th year of the reign of the most August Heraclius.

== Structure ==
The Byzantine Empire inherited the concept of chronicles (Annales) and histories (Historia) as distinct genres, with different writing styles and public appeal; this distinction can already be found in the works of Sempronius Asellio in the 1st century BC. As with other examples of its genre, the Chronicon Paschale is a popular account which relates anecdotes, physical descriptions of the chief personages (which at times are careful portraits), and extraordinary events such as earthquakes and the appearance of comets. It links Church history with a supposed Biblical chronology. For the years 600 to 627 the author writes as a contemporary historian—that is, through the last years of emperor Maurice, the reign of Phocas, and the first seventeen years of the reign of Heraclius.

The Chronicon Paschale is a huge compilation, attempting a chronological list of events from the creation of Adam. The principal manuscript, the 10th-century Codex Vaticanus graecus 1941, is damaged at the beginning and end and stops short at 627. The Chronicle proper is preceded by an introduction containing reflections on Christian chronology and on the calculation of the Paschal (Easter) cycle. The so-called Byzantine calendar, which continued in use in Greek Orthodox Christianity until the end of Turkish rule as the 'Julian calendar', was adopted in the Chronicon as the foundation of chronology; accordingly the date of the creation is given as 21 March 5507 BC.

== Authorship ==
The author identifies himself as a contemporary of the Emperor Heraclius (r. 610–641), and was possibly a cleric attached to the suite of the Ecumenical Patriarch Sergius. The work was probably written during the last ten years of the reign of Heraclius.

The chief authorities used were: Sextus Julius Africanus; the Fasti consulares; the Chronicle and Church History of Eusebius; John Malalas; the Acta Martyrum; the treatise of Epiphanius, bishop of Constantia (the old Salamis) in Cyprus (fl. 4th century), on Weights and Measures.

== Editions ==
- Matthaeus Raderus (Munich, 1615): Chronicon Alexandrinum idemque astronomicum et ecclesiasticum (editio princeps, Greek text with Latin translation)
- L. Dindorf (1832) in Corpus Scriptorum Historiae Byzantinae, with du Cange's preface and commentary
- J. P. Migne, Patrologia graeca, vol. 92.

=== Partial English translation ===
- Chronicon Paschale 284–628 AD, translated by Michael Whitby and Mary Whitby (Liverpool: Liverpool University Press, 1989) ISBN 0-85323-096-X
