= A History of the World in the 20th Century =

Book by John Grenville

- Author: J. A. S. Grenville
- Subject: History
- Publication date: 1994
- Dewey Decimal: 909.82
- LC Class: D421

A History of the World in the 20th Century is a history textbook by J. A. S. Grenville, first published in 1994. It is followed by A History of the World from the 20th to the 21st Century, which has reached its 5th edition, and is commonly used in International Baccalaureate 20th Century World History classes.

== Table of contents ==
- Social change and national rivalry in the West, 1900–1914
- The response of China and Japan to western dominance
- The Great War, revolution and the search for stability
- The continuing world crisis, 1929–1939
- The Second World War
- Post-war Europe, 1945–1947
- The United States and the beginning of the Cold War, 1945–1948
- The transformation of Asia, 1945–1955
- The ending of European dominance in the Middle East, 1919–1980
- The Cold War : superpower confrontation, 1948–1964
- The recovery of Western Europe in the 1950s and 1960s
- Who will liberate the Third World? : 1954-1968
- Two faces of Asia : after 1949
- Latin America after 1945 : problems unresolved
- Africa after 1945 : conflict and the threat of famine
- The United States and the Soviet bloc after 1963 : the great transformation
- Western Europe gathers strength : after 1968
- The Cold War and after

== Publication data ==
- A History of the World in the Twentieth Century, Belknap Press of Harvard University Press (2000), 1002 p., ISBN 0-674-00280-6
- A History of the World From the Twentieth to the Twenty-first Century, Routledge (2005), 995 p., ISBN 0-415-28954-8
