= Richard Geiger =

Austrian painter of Jewish descent (1870–1945)

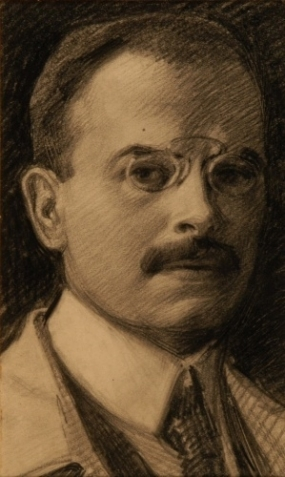
- Geiger
- Born: 29 June 1870; Vienna, Austria-Hungary
- Died: 9 February 1945 (aged 74); Budapest, Kingdom of Hungary
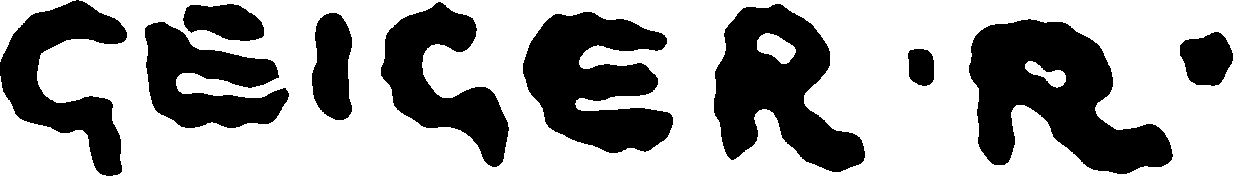

Richard Geiger (29 June 1870 – 9 February 1945) was an Austrian painter.

== Life and work ==
Geiger was born in Vienna, into a Hungarian Jewish family. His parents were Antal Geiger and Jozefin Wahringer. He first attended a drawing school and then studied at the Academy of Fine Arts Vienna, where he studied under Christian Griepenkerl and August Eisenmenger. He studied sculpture with Fritz Klimsch at the Academy of Arts in Berlin. There he took part in the exhibitions of the Academy with his portrait busts and sculptures. In Paris he studied at the Julian Academy and worked in the studio of François Flameng. While at the Julian Academy, he focused on painting scenes from the life of the clochards.

From 1893 Geiger worked as a genre painter in Budapest. He worked for the Izidor Kner publishing house in Gyomaendrőd, among others. From 1906 Geiger illustrated twenty Hungarian editions of the works of Karl May for the Budapest Athenaeum publishing house. He produced a total of 104 autotypes. During World War I he worked as an illustrator for the Hungarian weekly Tolnai Világlapja. In the 1920s he illustrated a large number of books and produced numerous portraits of Pierrette (the female version of a Pierrot). He won several prizes in graphic competitions and took part in exhibitions in France, Germany and Hungary.

Initially he worked for a Hungarian weekly magazine. By the 1920s, he worked illustrating books, bookplates and posters. His paintings included portraits, nudes, genre paintings, and mythological scenes, but he was known for his illustrations, especially his carnival motifs.

== Selected works ==
- A világ történelme (Endrei) with Endrei Zalán
- Sich räkelnde, rauchende Dame mit Akkordeonspieler im Wirtshaus
- Sängerin mit Bandoneonspieler in einem Wirtshaus
- Colombine mit Pierrot und Harlekin
- Varietémusikerin mit Gitarre
- Zigeunerin mit Tamburin
- Haremsdame mit Papagei
- Südländische Schönheit
- Harlekinek
- Sérénade

== Gallery ==
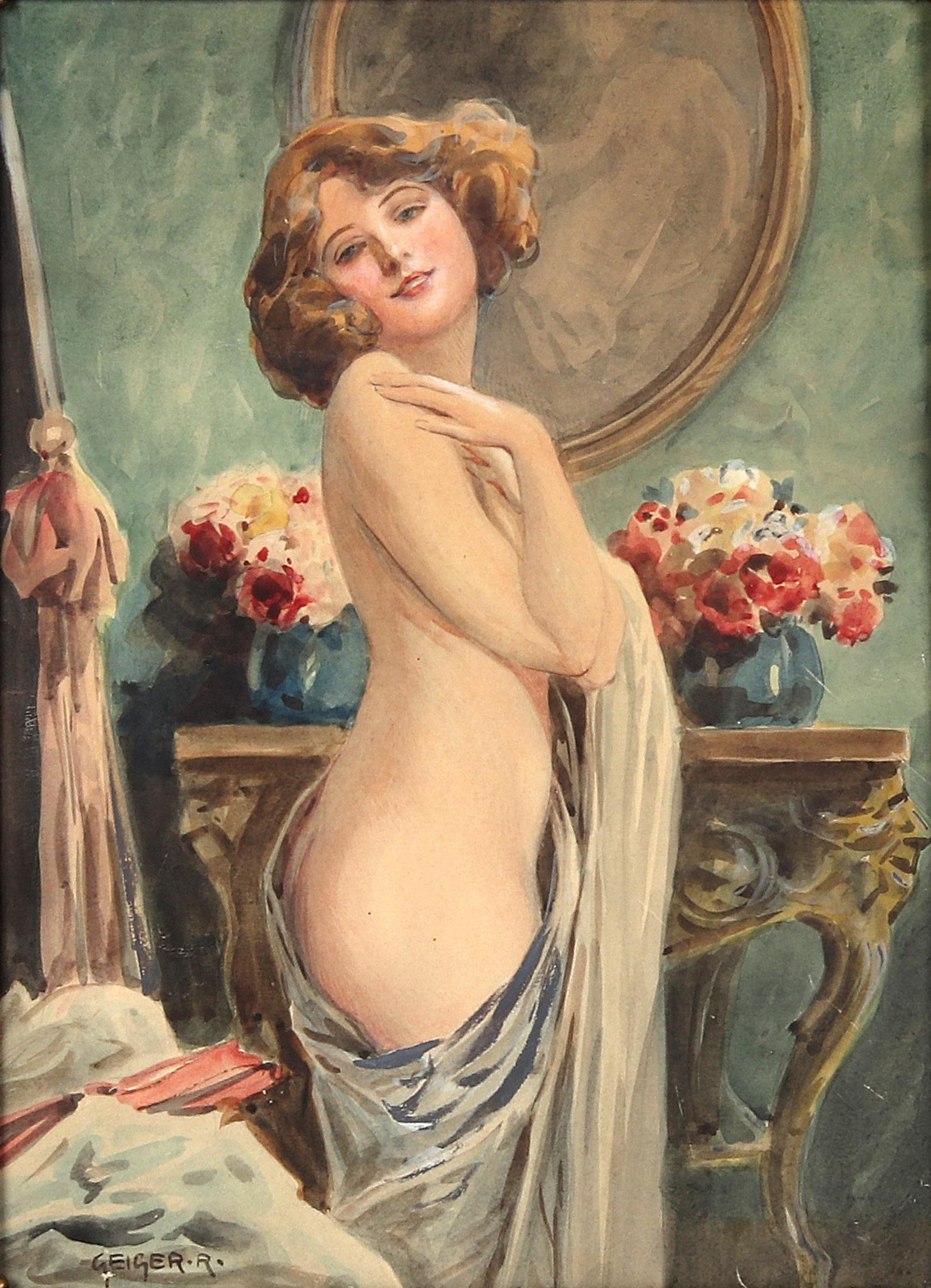
Junge Schönheit

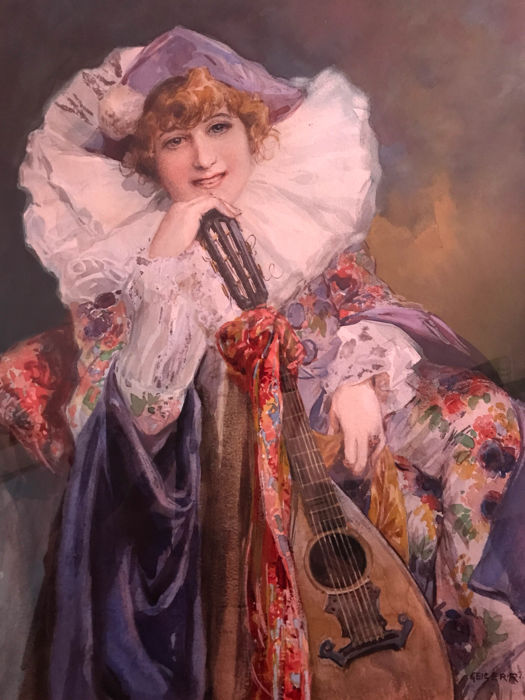
Pierrette met Luit

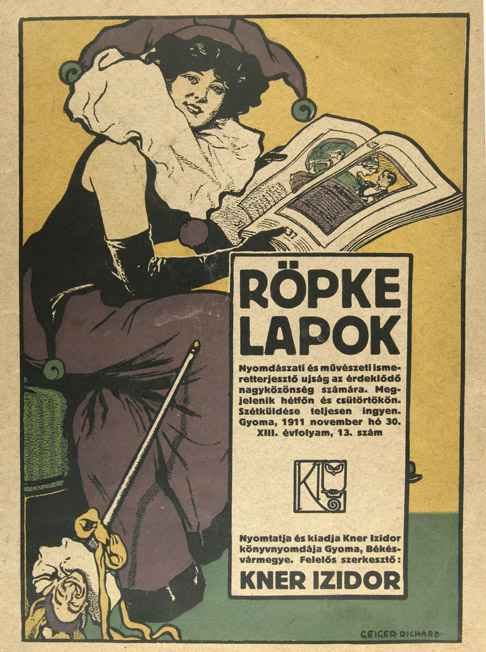
Röpke lapok cover

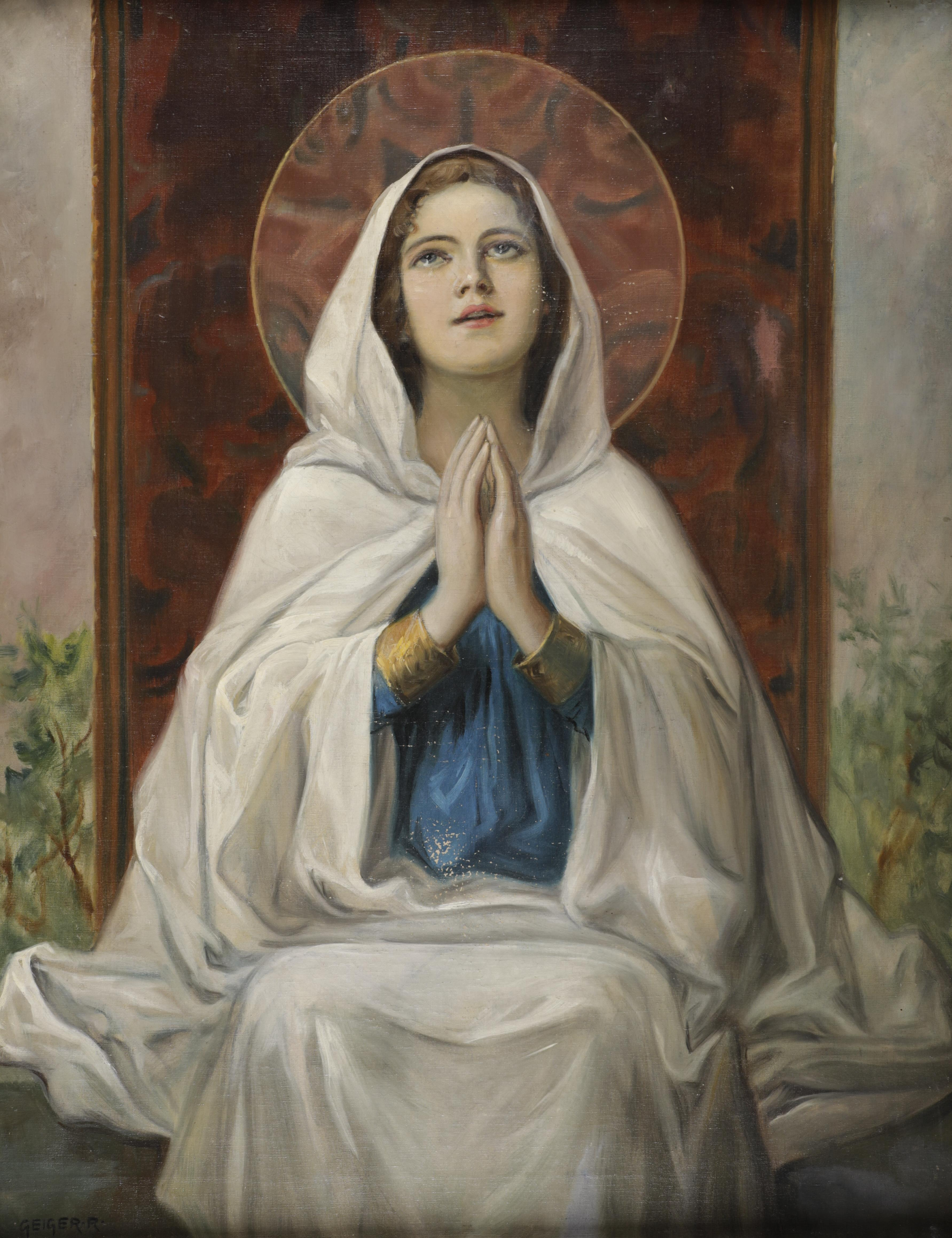
Madonna

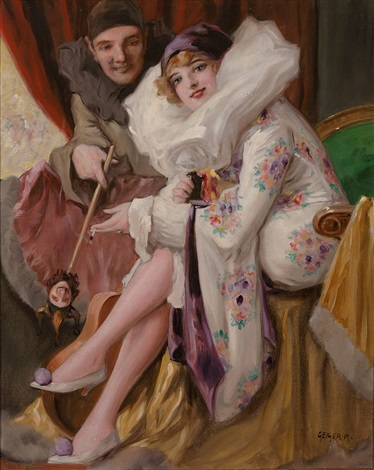
Pierrot and Pierrette
