= A History of the World =

Historical Series

A World History
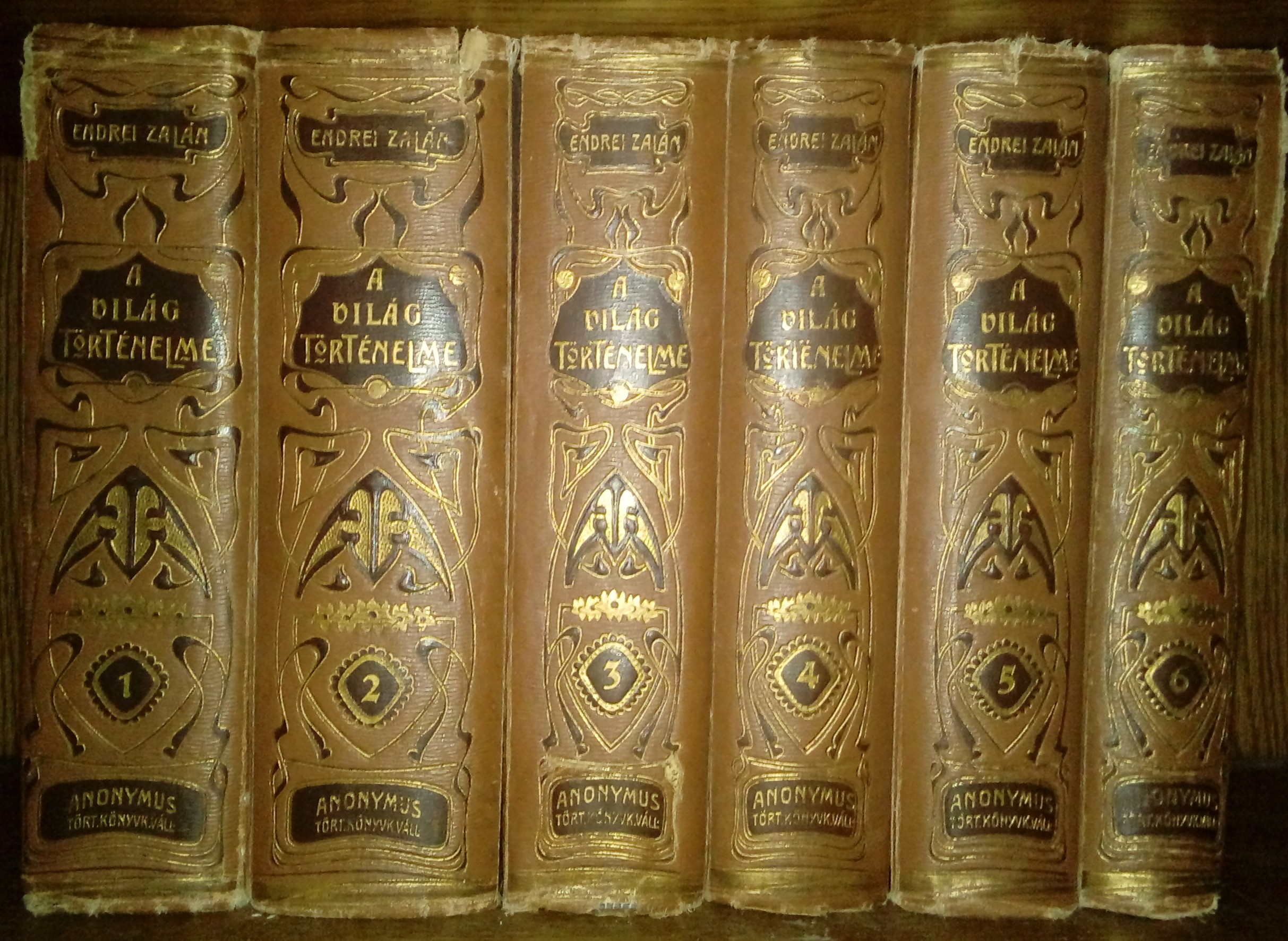
- Author: Endrei Zalán
- Original title: A világ történelme
- Illustrator: Richard Geiger
- Language: Hungarian
- Series: Six volumes
- Subject: World history
- Genre: World history
- Publisher: Műintézet és Kiadóvállalat R.-T.
- Publication date: 1906–1908
- Publication place: Hungary

A History of the World, (Hungarian: A világ történelme) edited by Endrei Zalán and illustrated by Richard Geiger, is a six-volume history of the world in Hungarian published between 1906 and 1908.

== Background ==
Written for the general public, the books are Art Nouveau style, large-format, gilded, and bound. Illustrated with hundreds of black-and-white and color images, printed on polished paper by Richard Geiger, and was published by Műintézet és Kiadóvállalat R.-T. in Budapest. The six volumes range from the Ancient East to the present (i.e. the beginning of the 20th century). They cover the period of ancient Greeks, the Roman Empire, the Middle Ages and the modern age. In each volume, the editor used works by Victor Duruy, Fekten Károly, H. Grimme, Heyck Ödön, Huber Alfonz, and Alfred Nicolas Rambaud.

The series is divided into six volumes, but some parts extend into other volumes, and some parts start in the middle of a volume. This makes it difficult to use the work. There is no reprint of this work.

== Volumes ==
=== A világ történelme ===
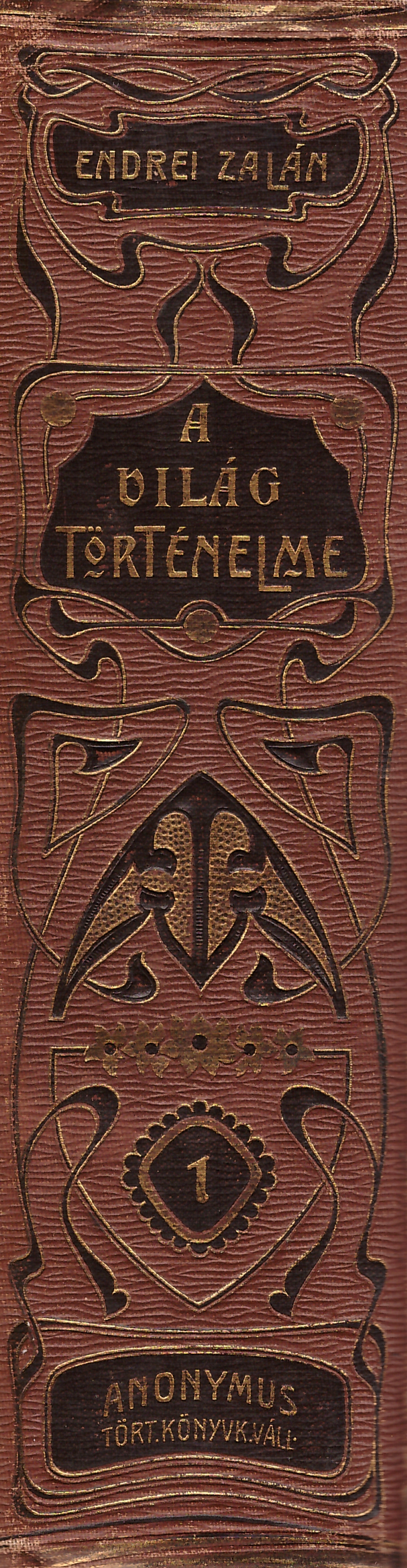
Book spine	Volume number	Volume title	Era	Period covered	Pages	Year of publication
	Volume I	People of the East; Egypt • Ancient Asian • The Age of Egypt's Revival • The People of Israel • Assyria and Babylon • Lydian Kingdom • Medean Empire • Persian Empire • India	Ancient	ca. 3000 BC – 330 BC	750 p.	1906
	Volume II	Classical Peoples Part I – History of the Greek Peoples; Greek Mythology • History of the Greeks	Ancient	ca. 1300 BC – 323 BC	560 p.	1906
	Volume III	Classical Peoples Part II – History of the Romans; Roman Republic • Roman Empire • Pax Romana • Decline of the Roman Empire	Ancient	753 BC – 337	506 p.	1907
	Volume IV	The Age of Migration and the Crusades; The Age of Migration • The Age of the Crusades	Middle Ages	337–1440	604 p.	1908
	Volume V	The Age of Discovery and the Reformation; Age of Discovery • The Reformation	Modern history	1440–1789	444 p.	1908
	Volume VI	The Age of the Victory of Human Rights; The French Revolution • Napoleon • Great European Changes • The Death of William I	Current age	1789–1888	138 p.	1908

== Gallery ==
The volumes featured hundreds of illustrations by Richard Geiger in the Art Nouveau style.

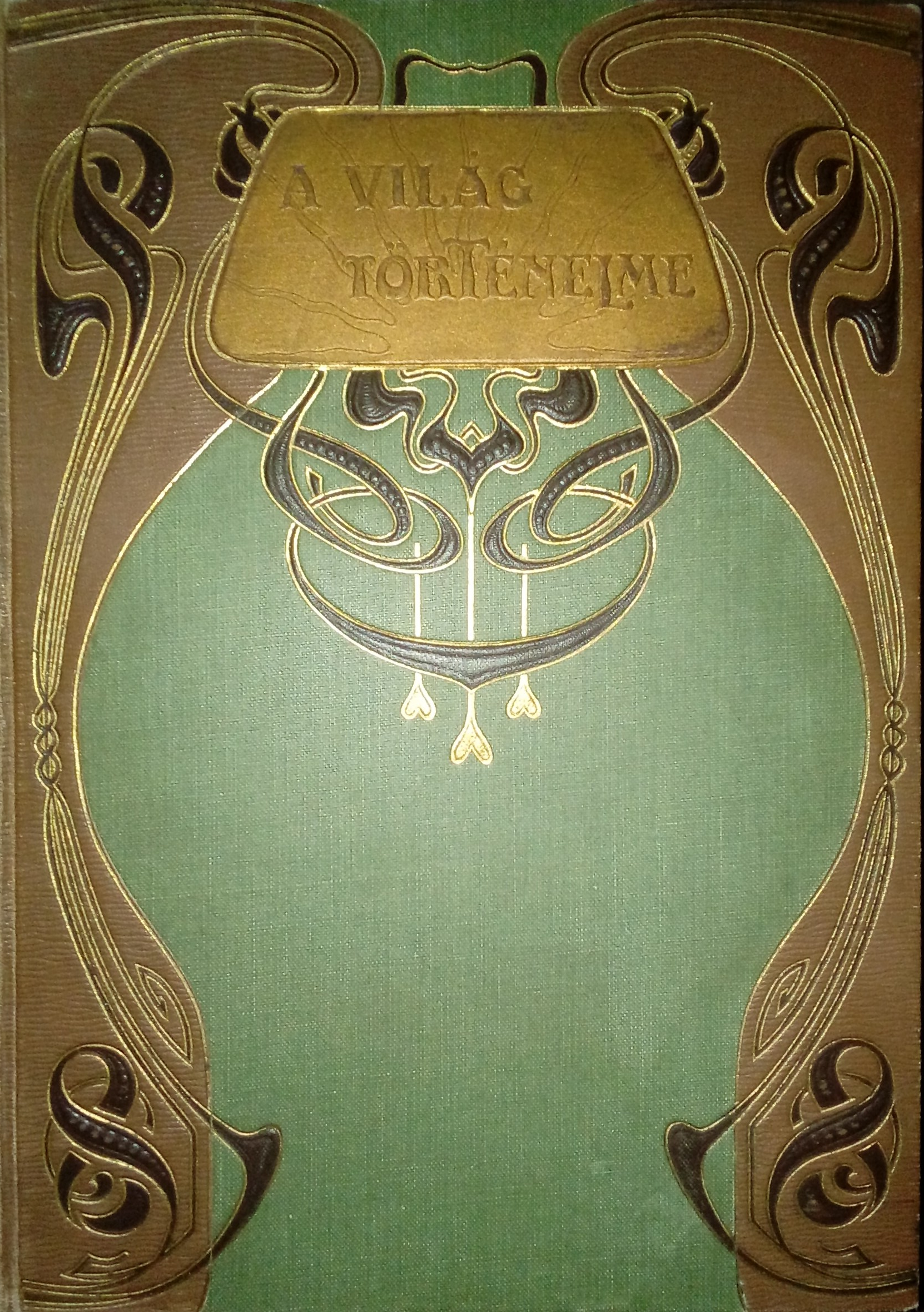
Ornate front cover

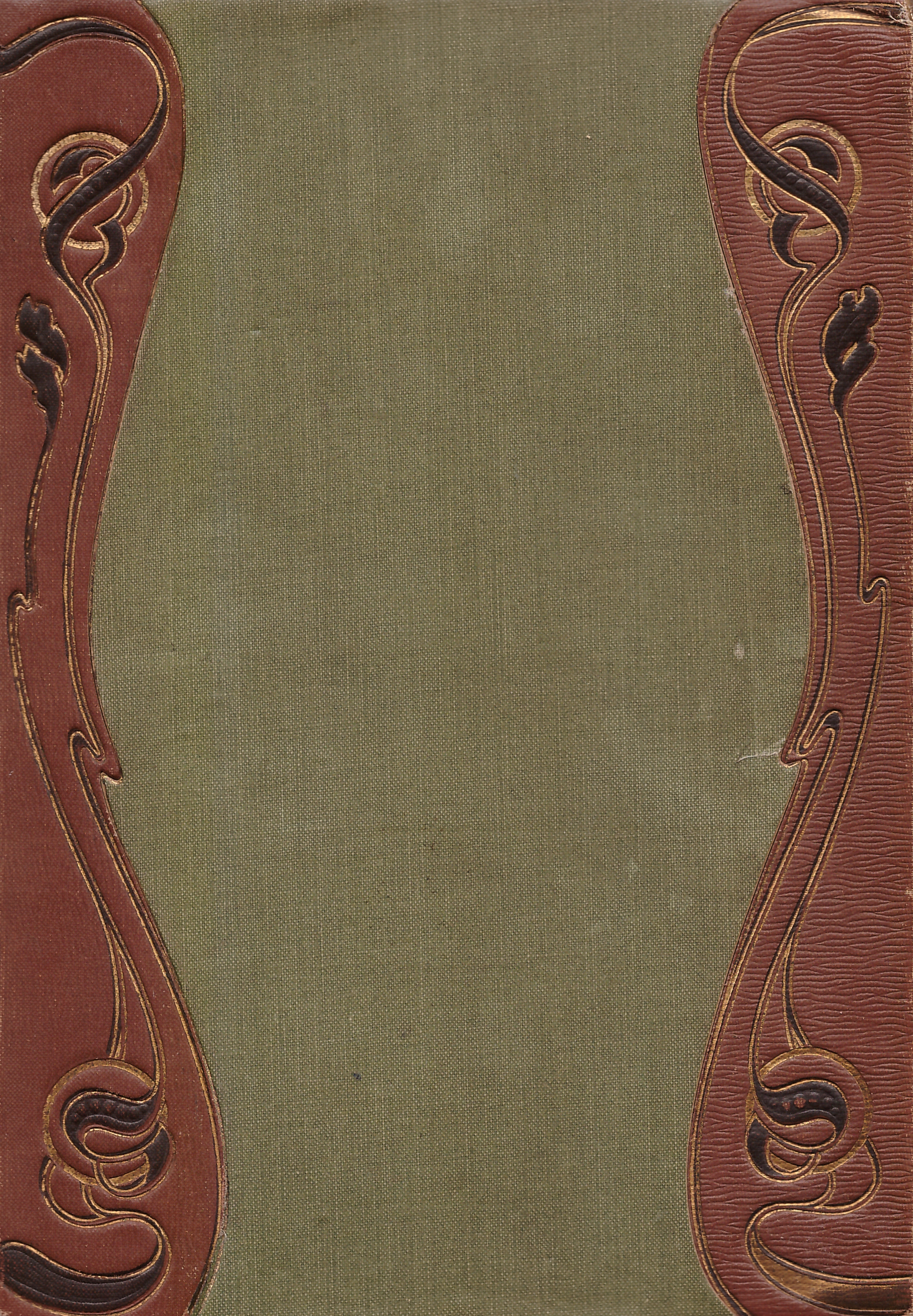
Back cover

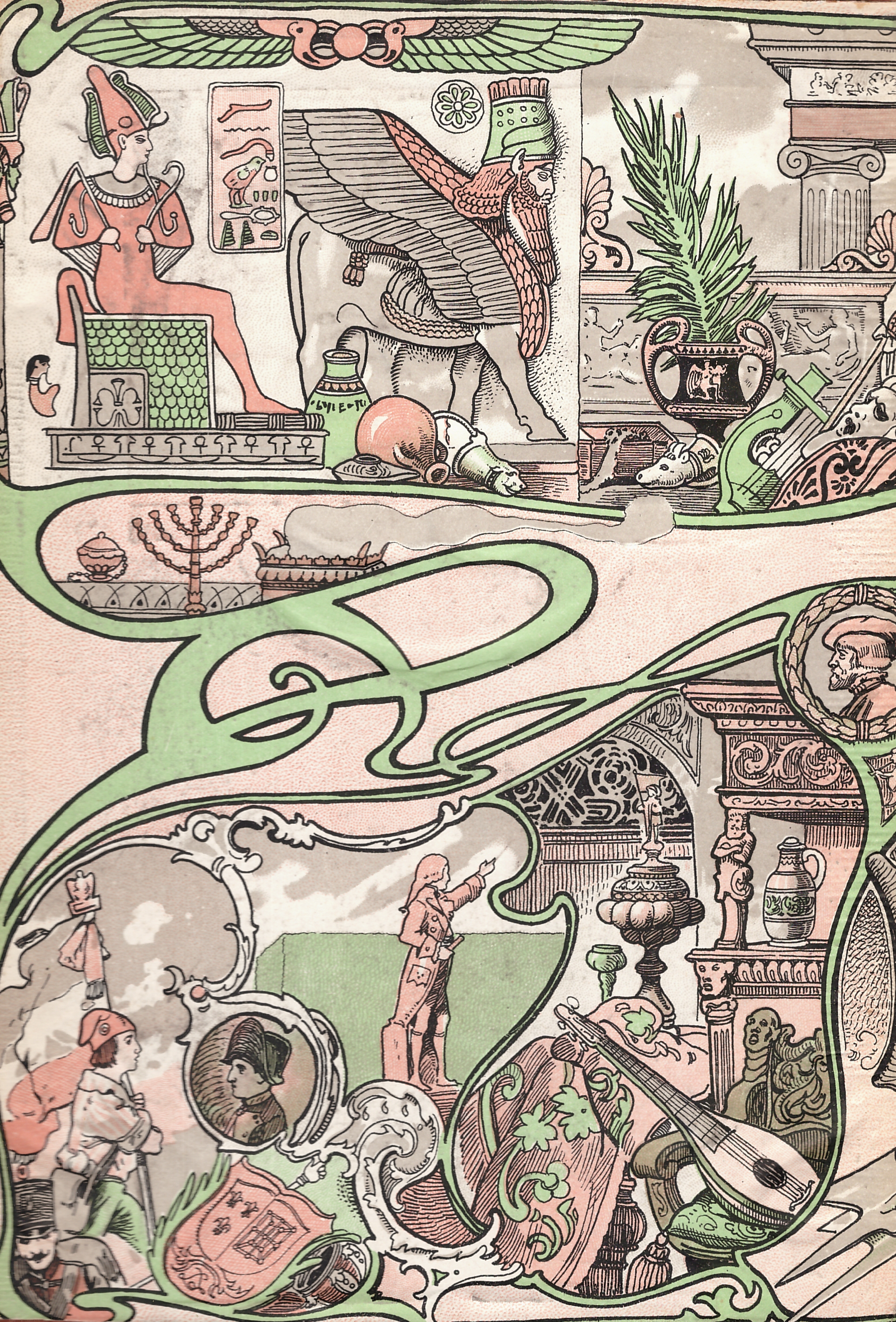
Colored front page

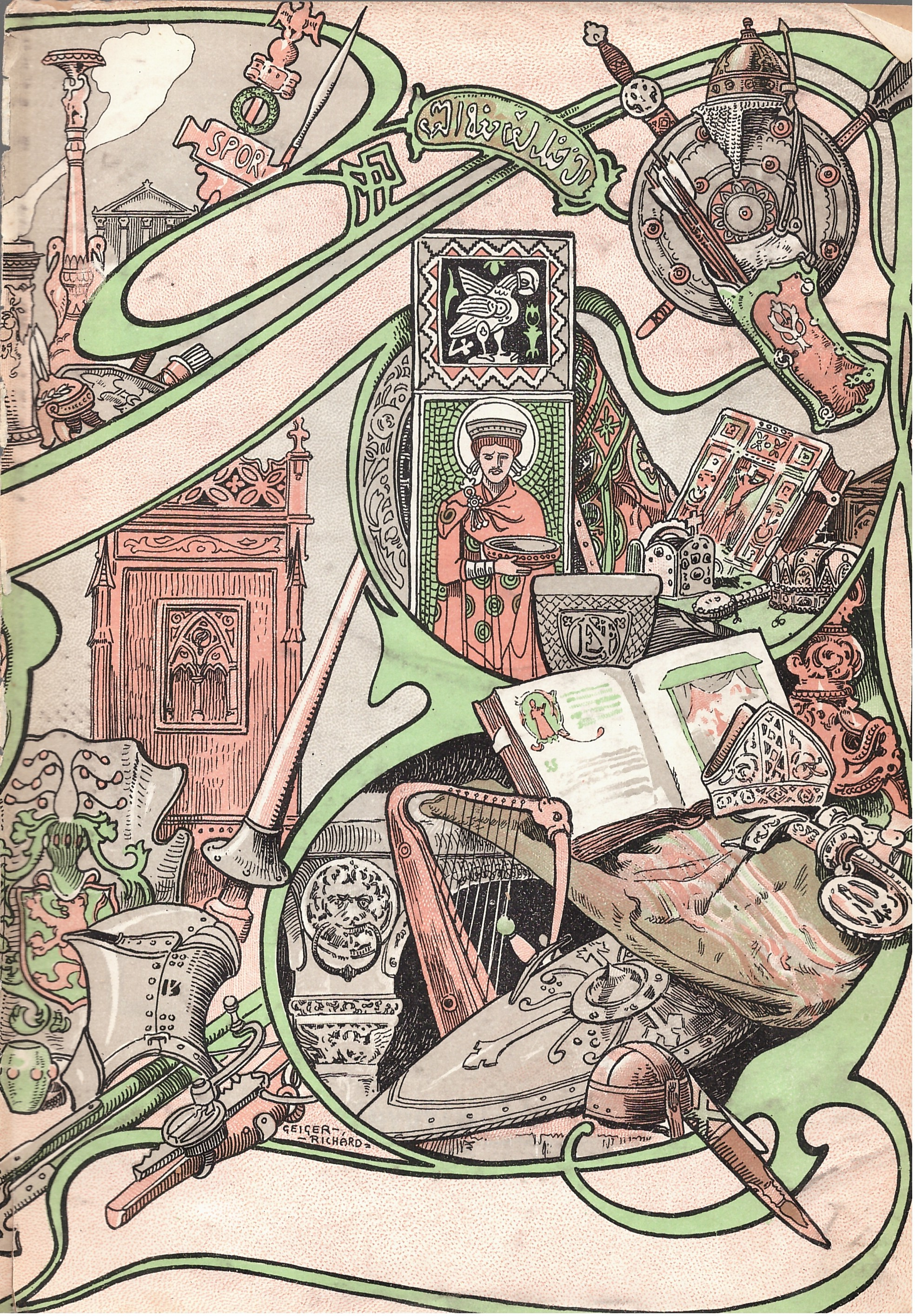
Colored front page

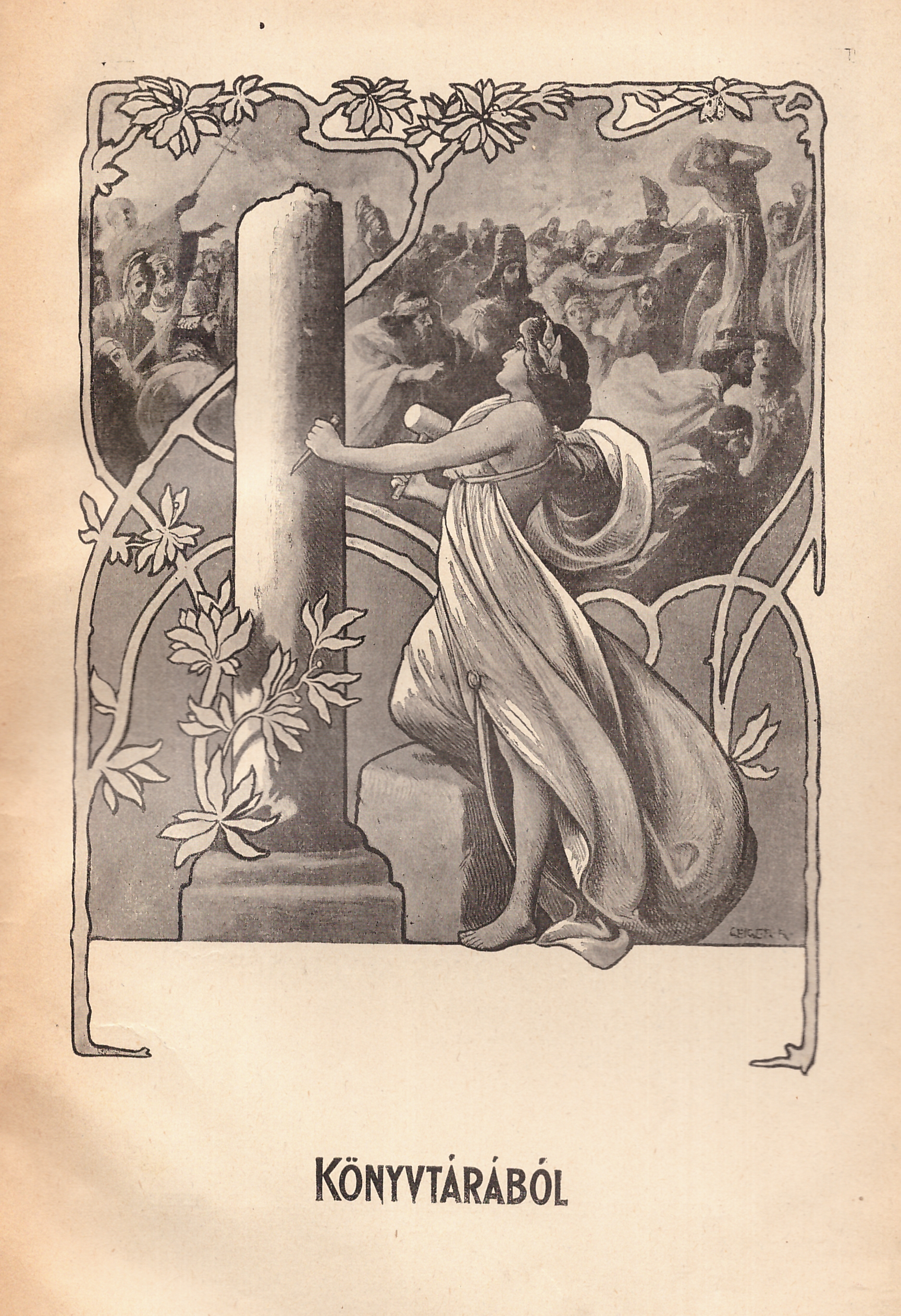
Owner registration pag

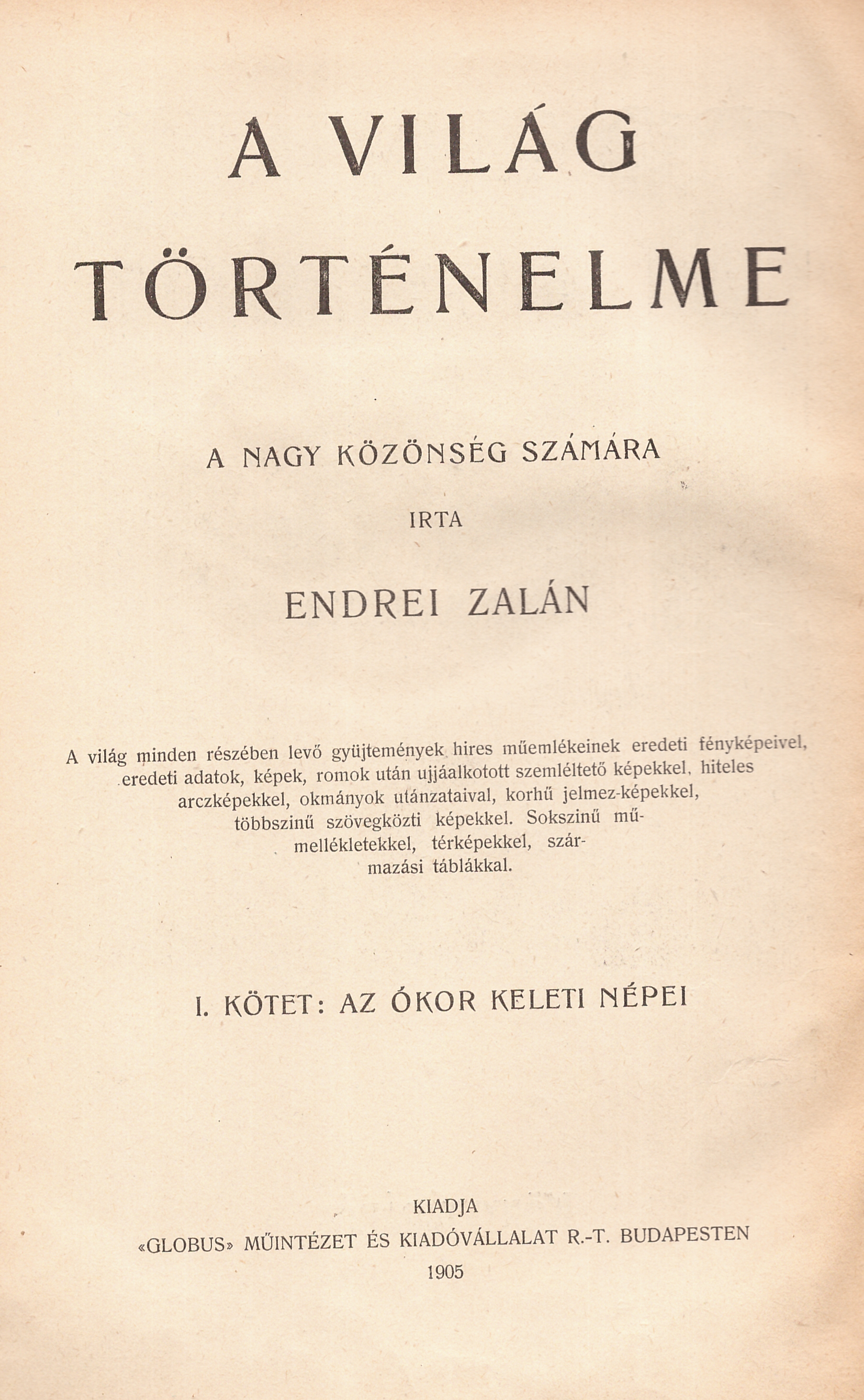
Serial page

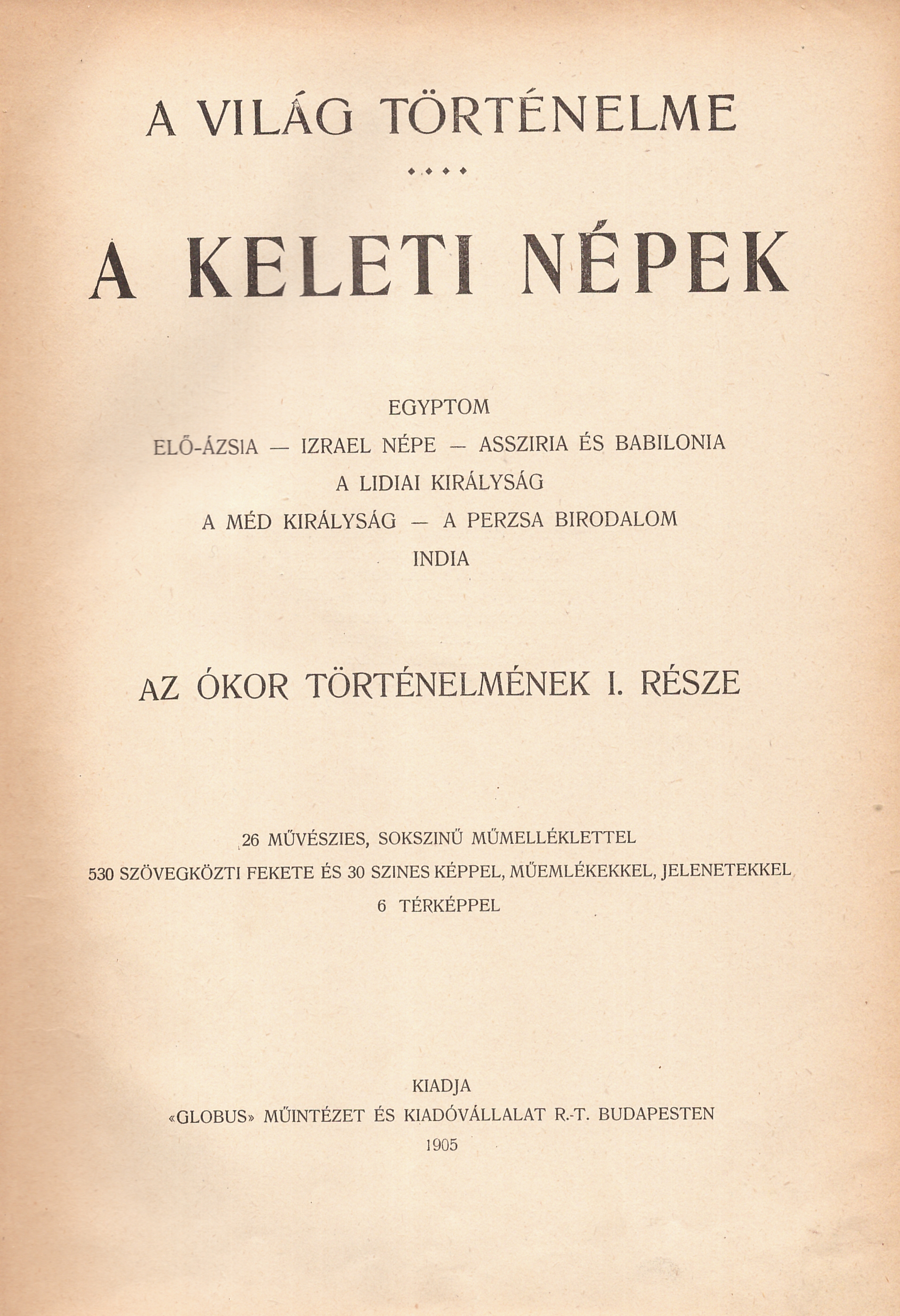
Cover (Volume I)

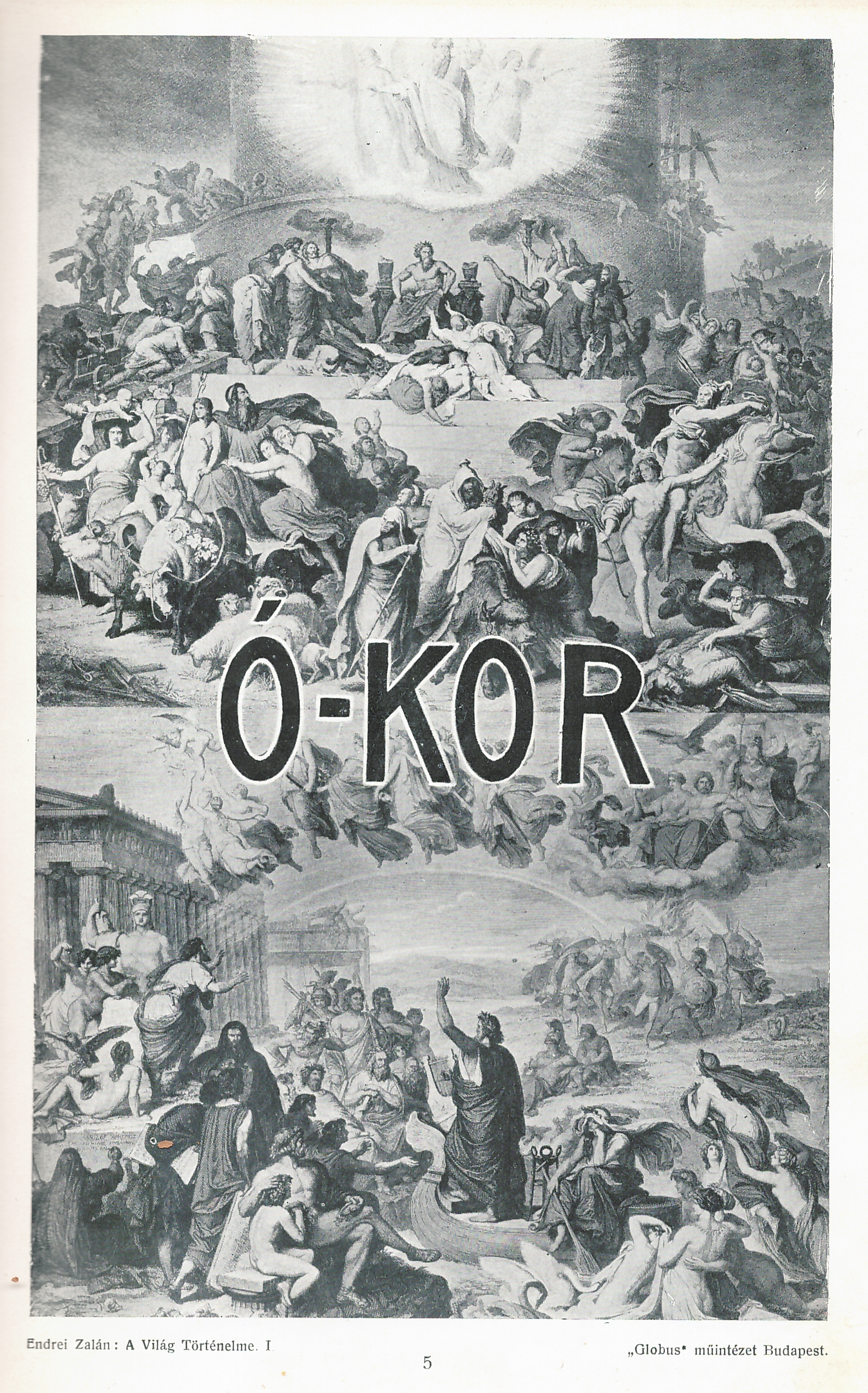
Second cover

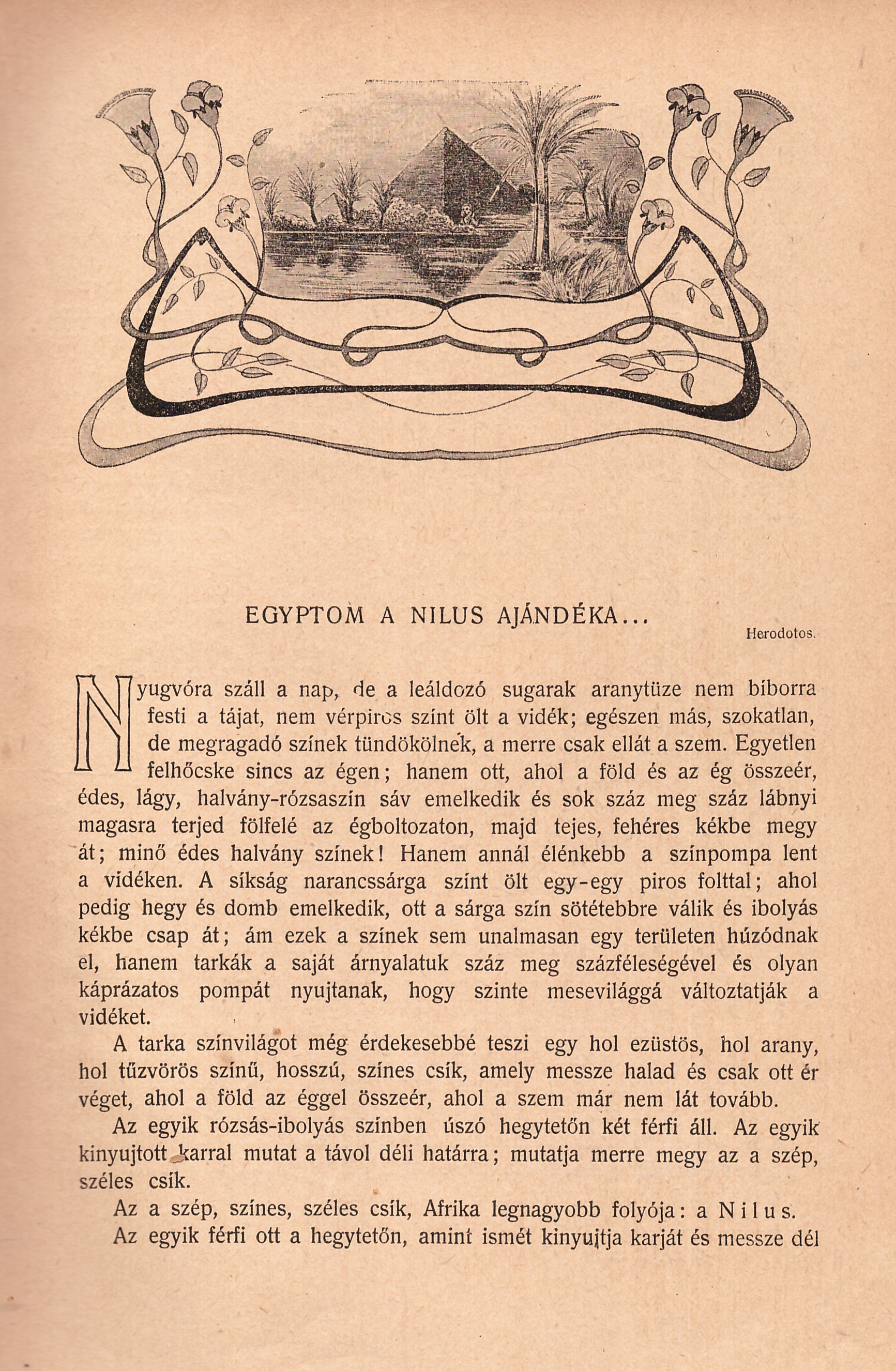
Chapter decoration

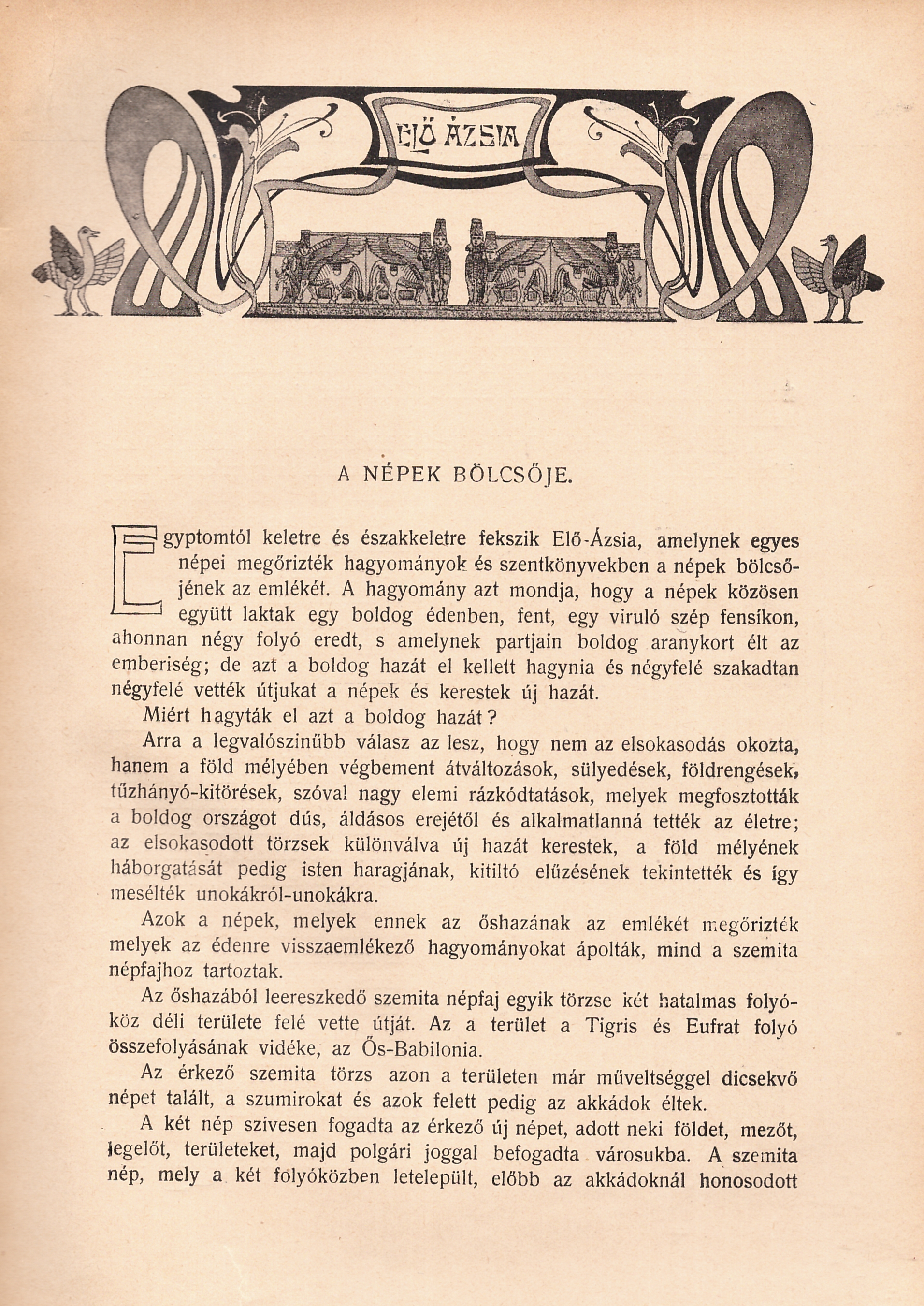
Chapter decoration

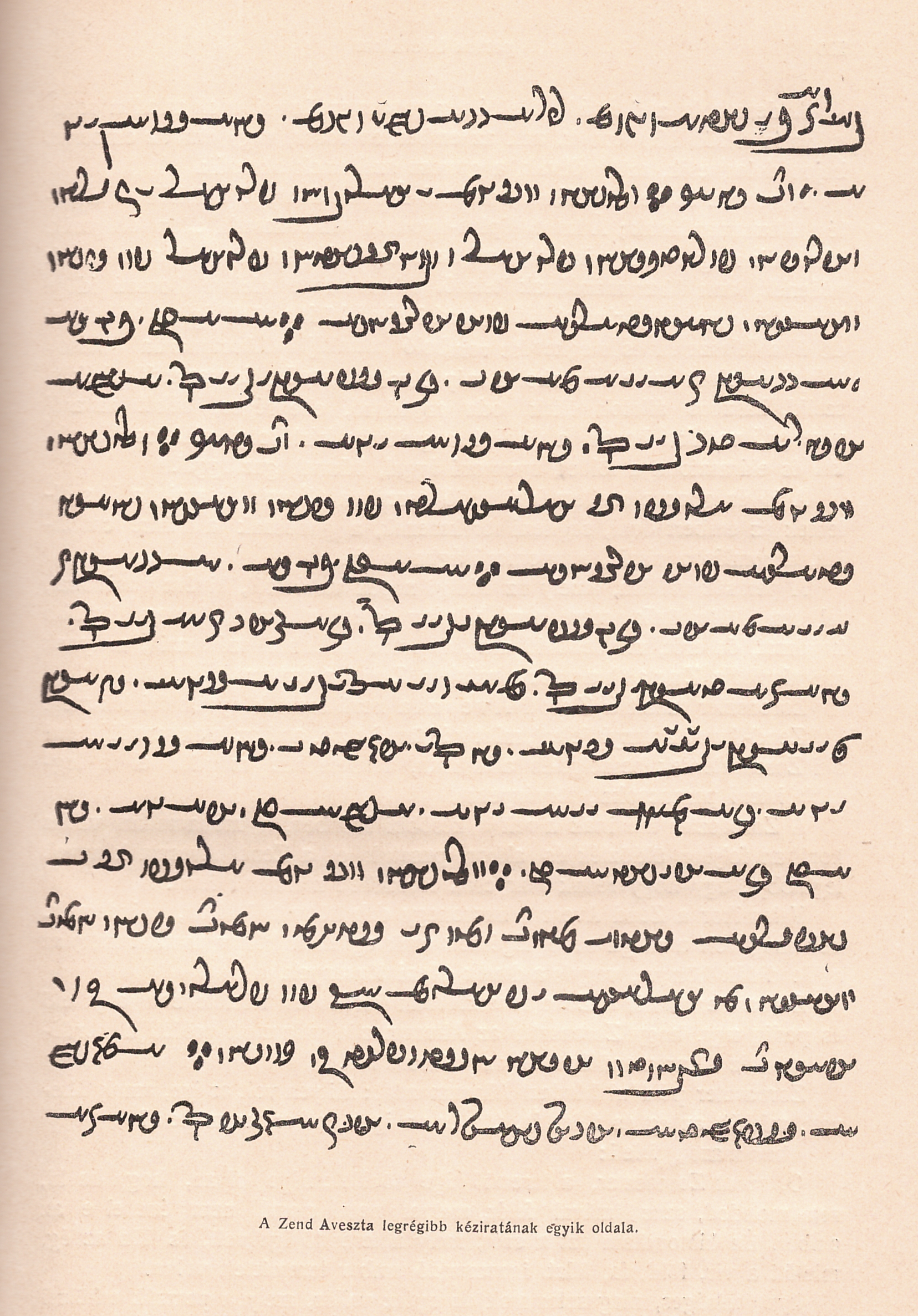
Reproduced text

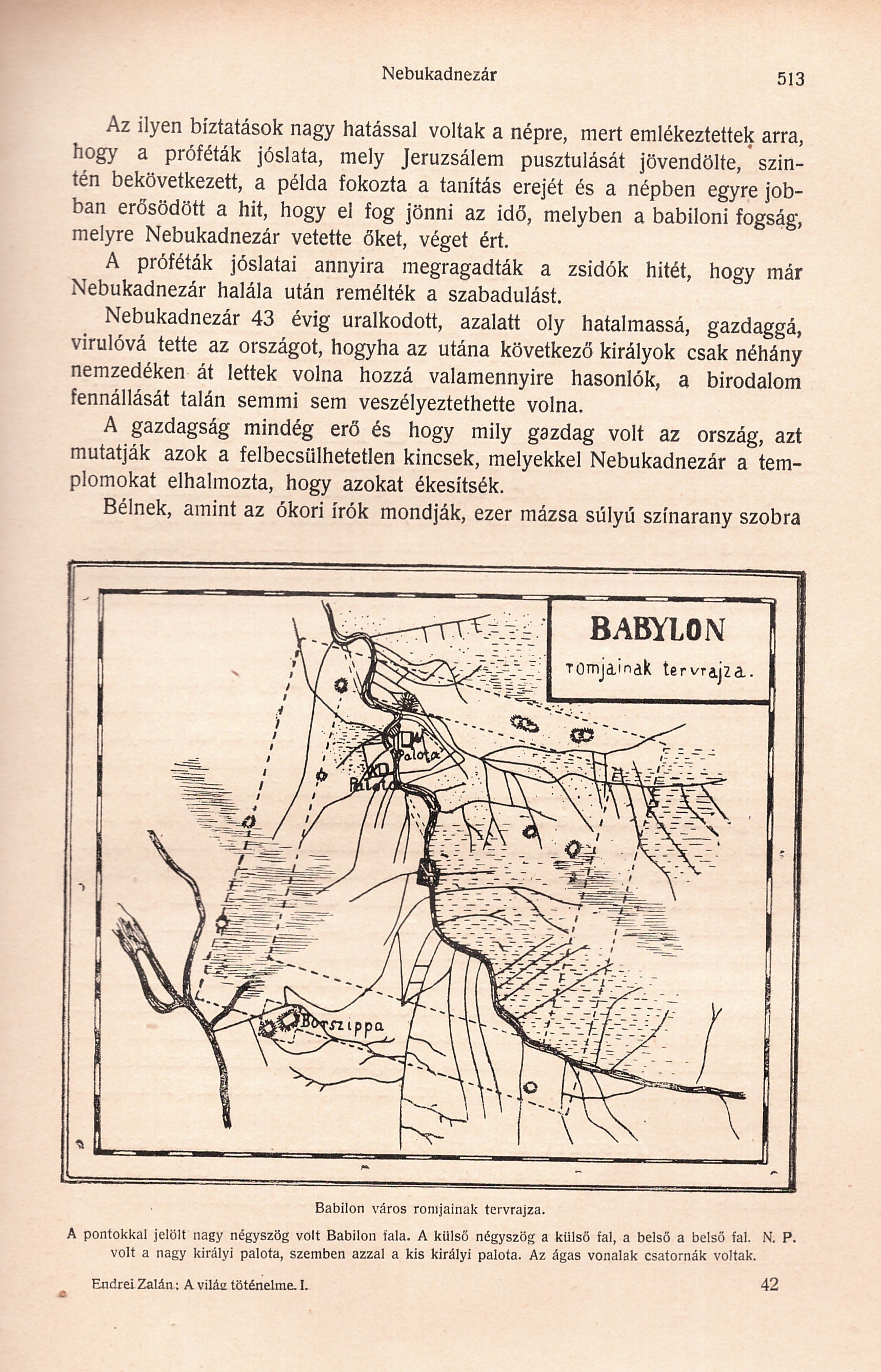
Map outline

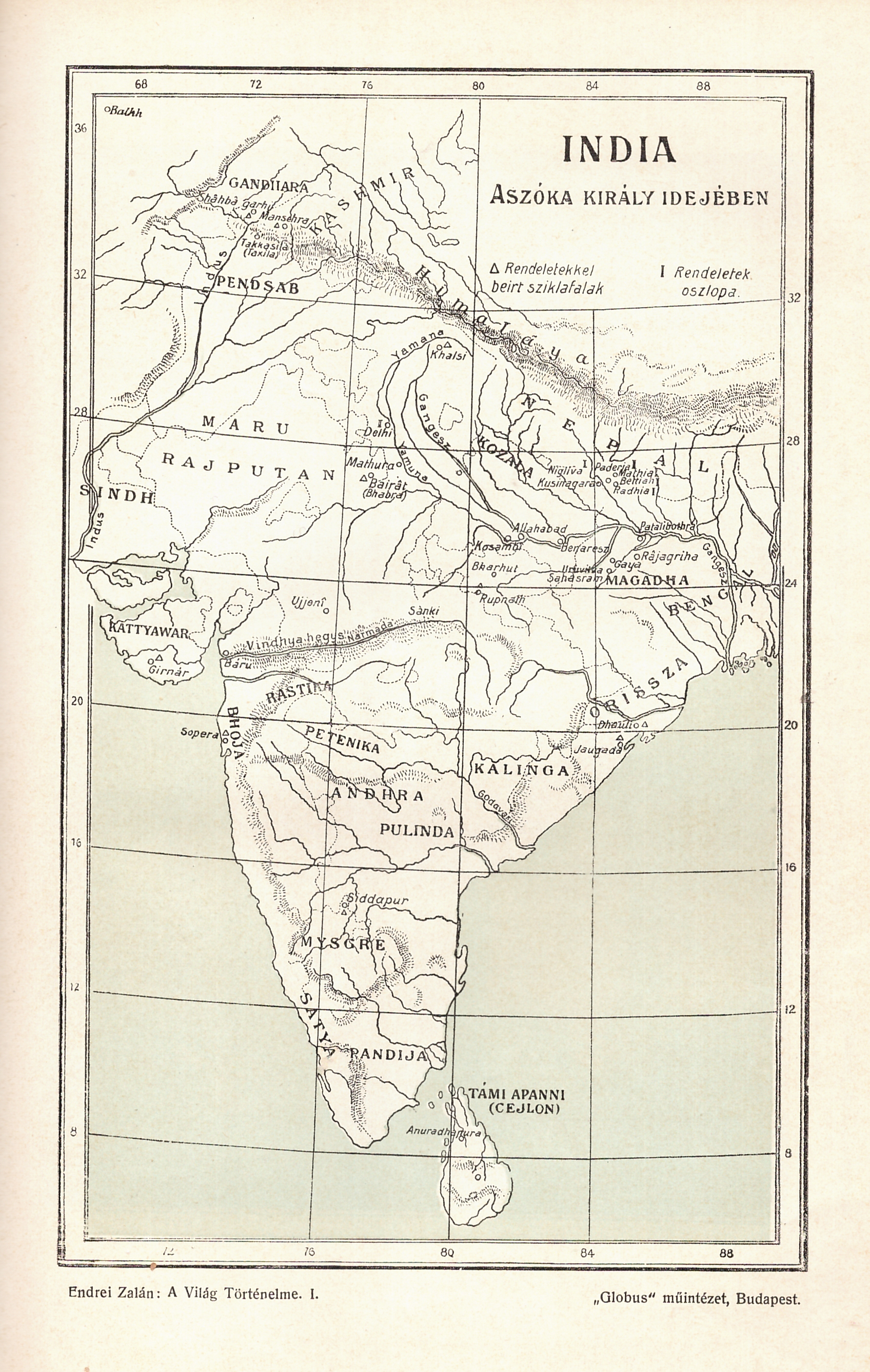
Full page map

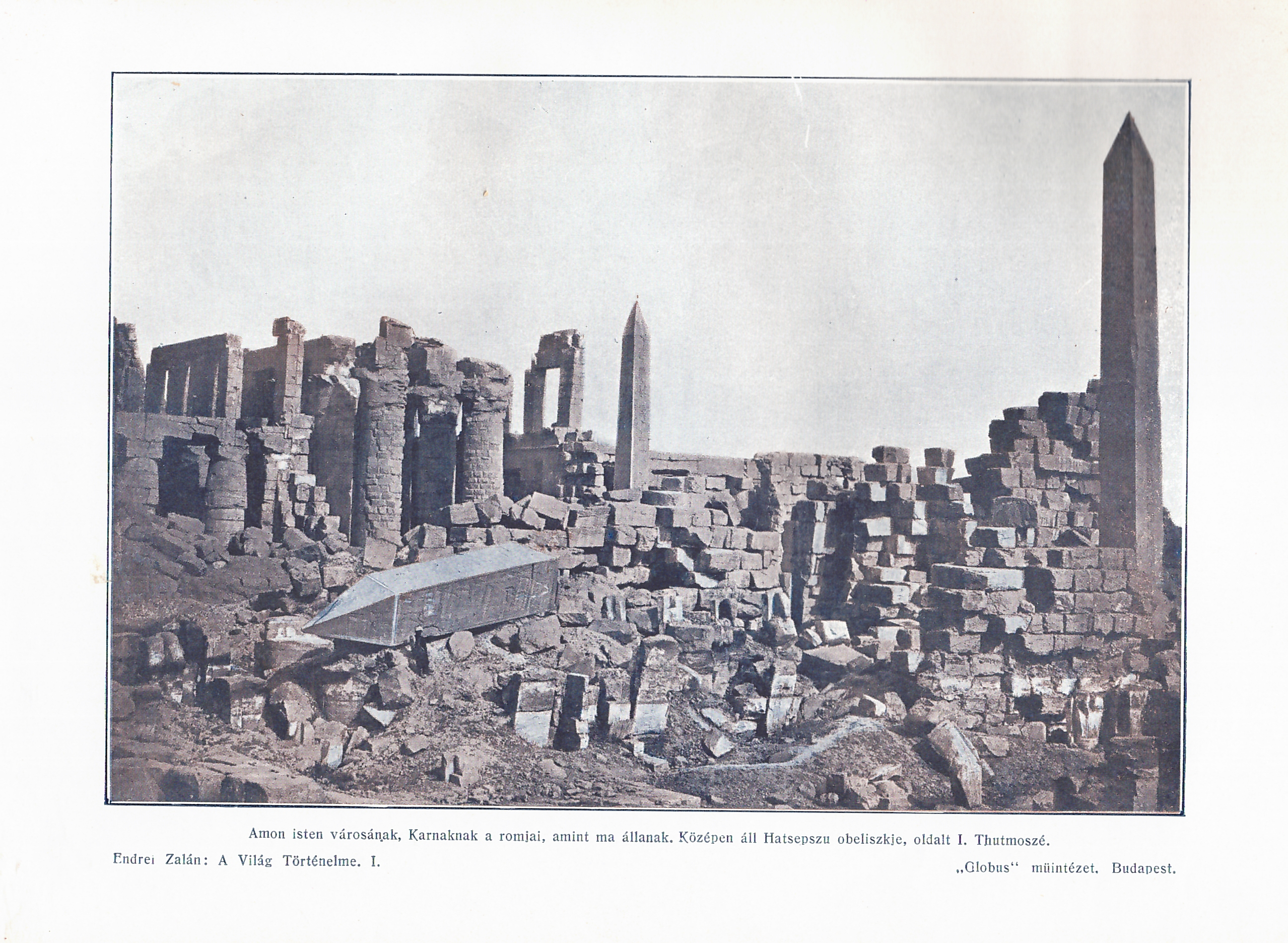
Full page photo
(rotated)

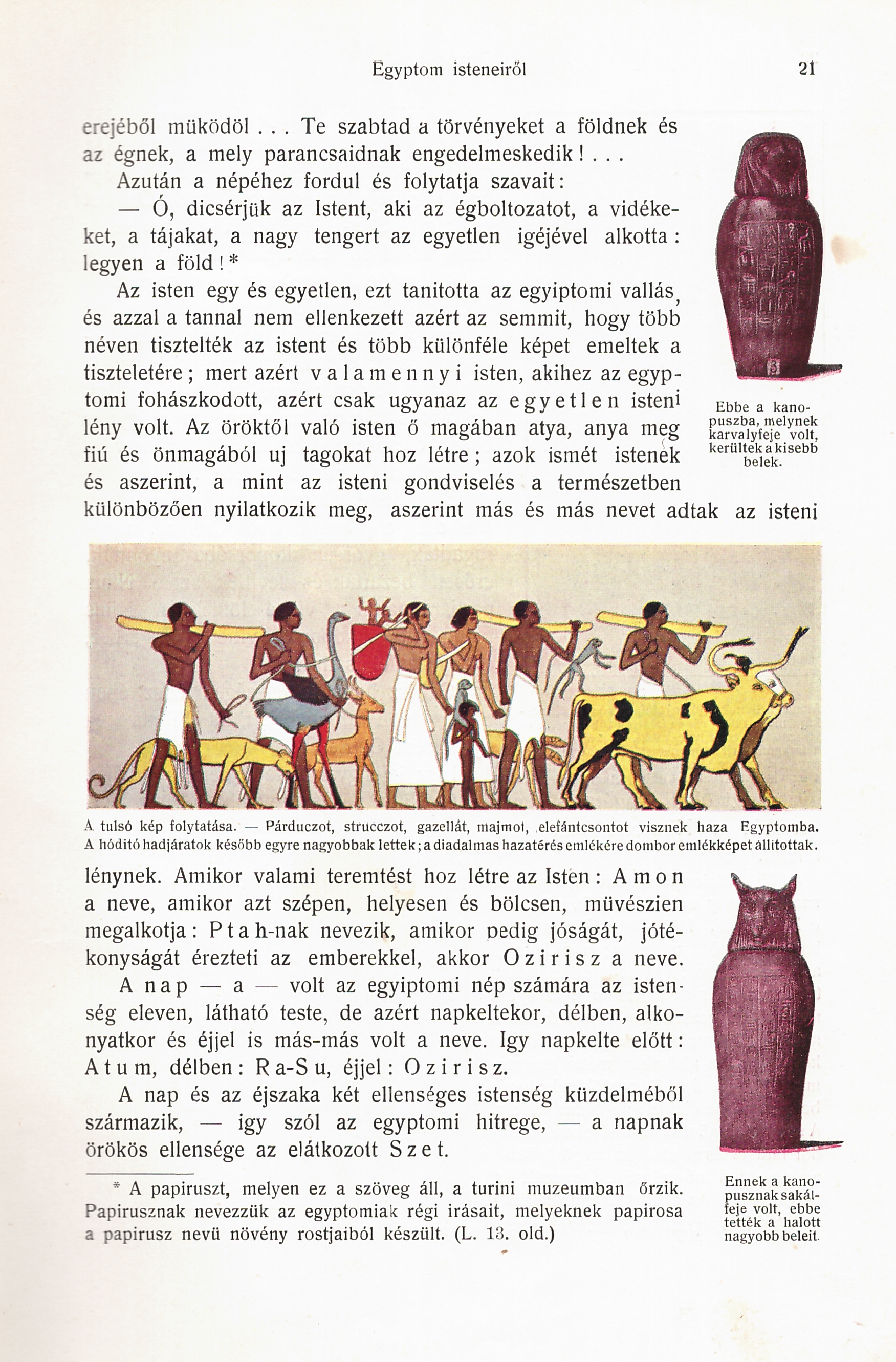
Color text images
(printing on other types of papera)

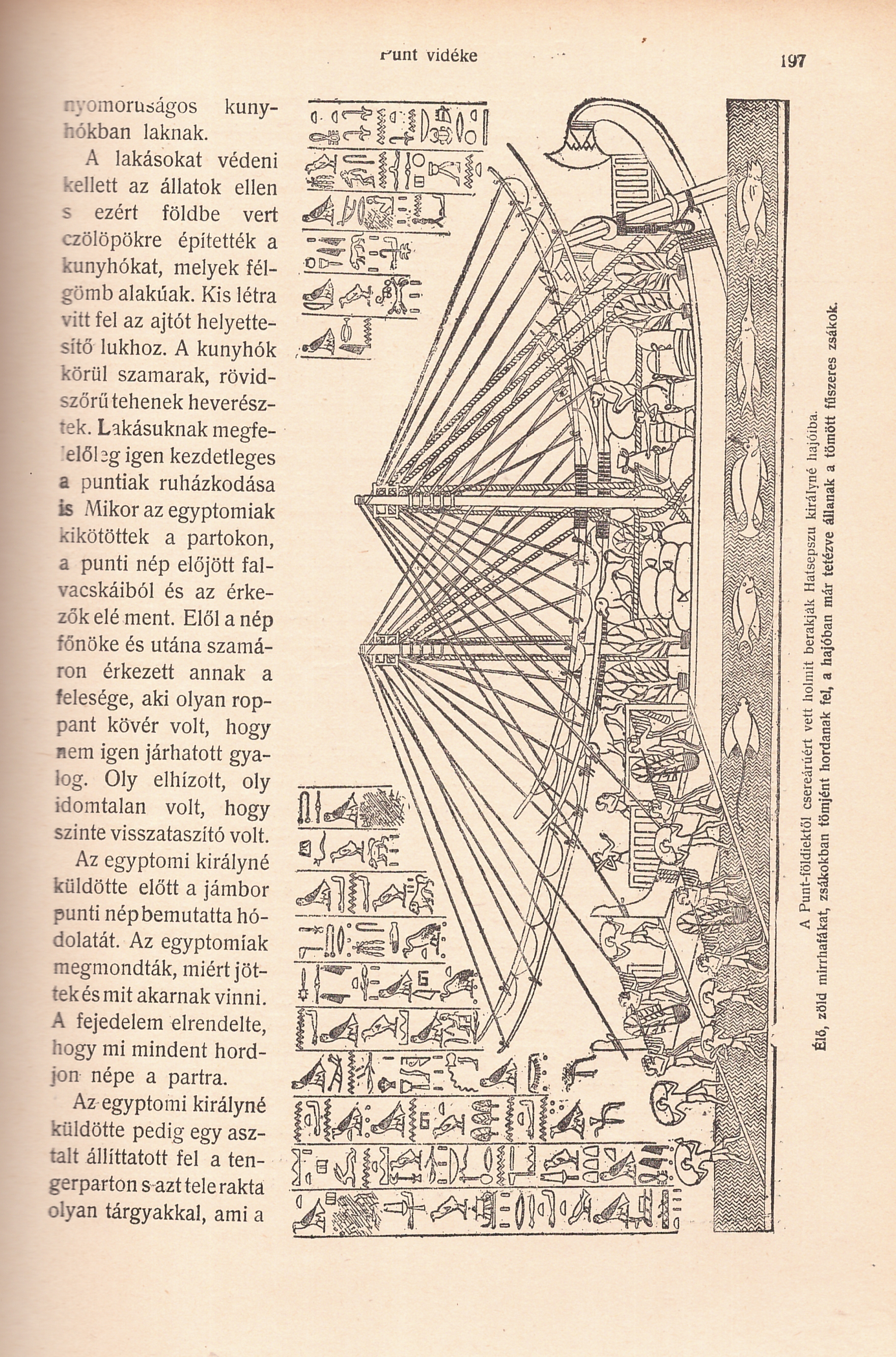
Text image

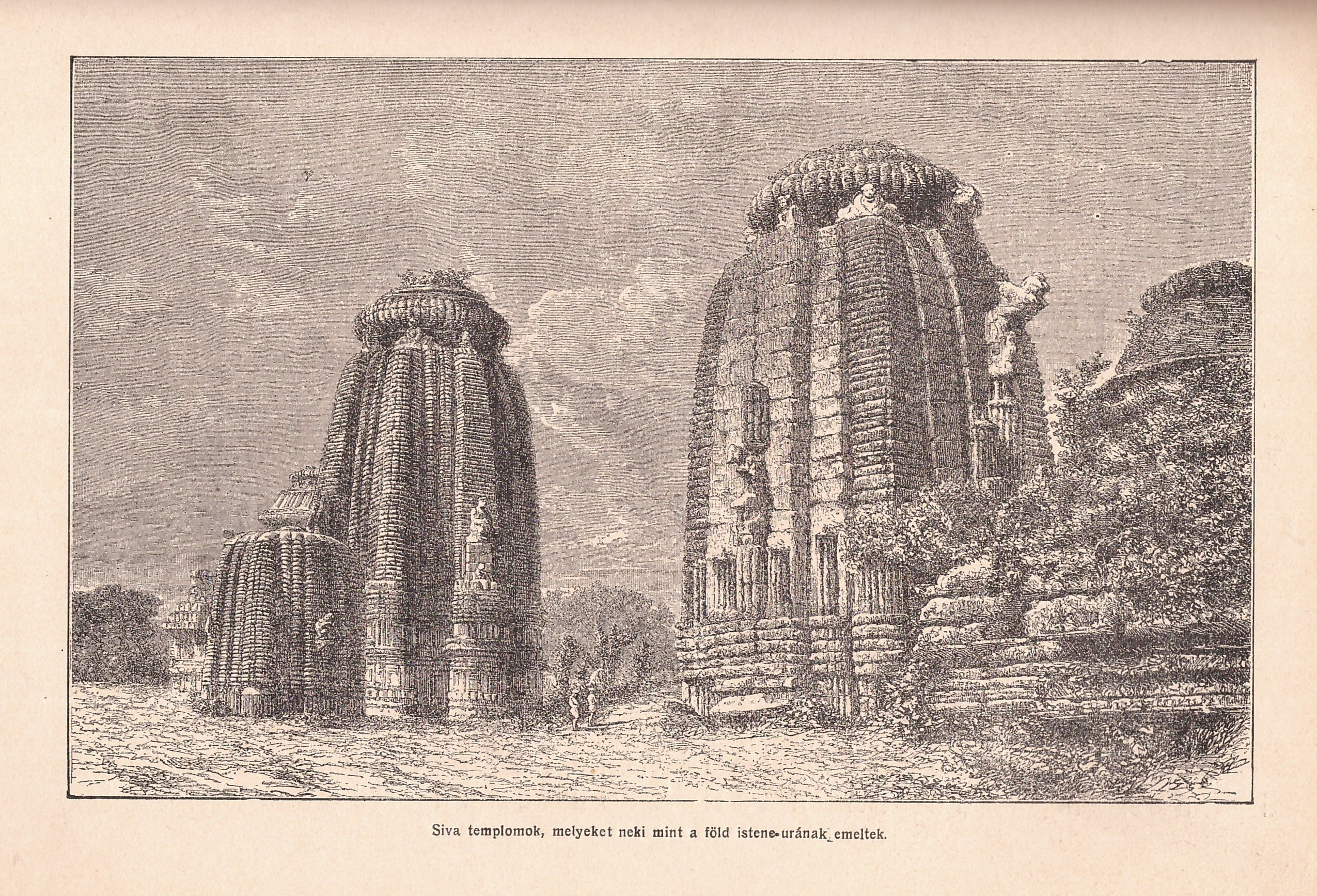
Full page image
(rotated)

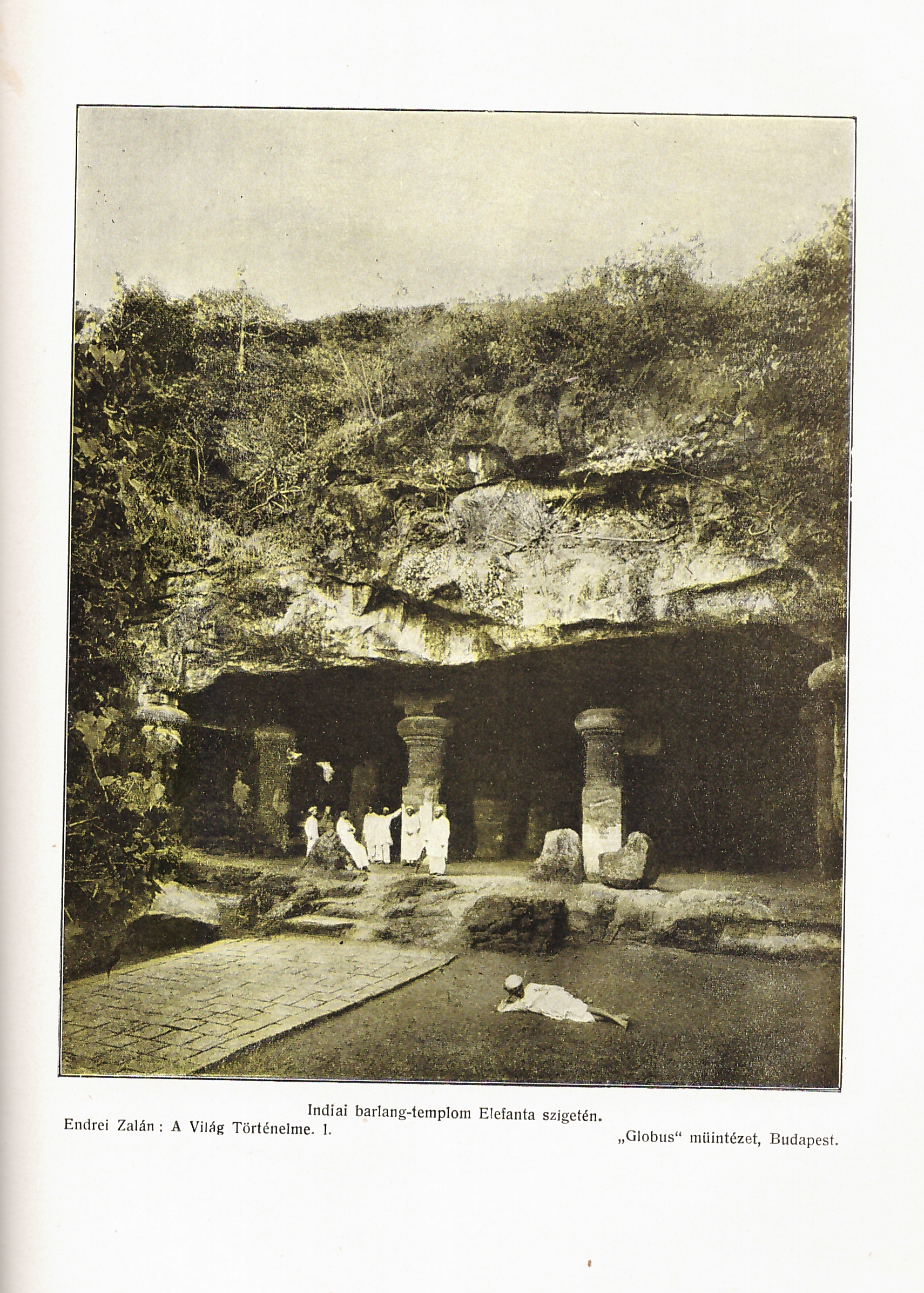
Full page photo

== See also ==
- Human history

== Bibliography ==
- Zalán, Endrei [in Hungarian], ed. (1906–1912). A világ történelme. I–VI. Budapest: Műintézet és Kiadóvállalat R.-T.
