= John Grenville =

John Ashley Soames Grenville
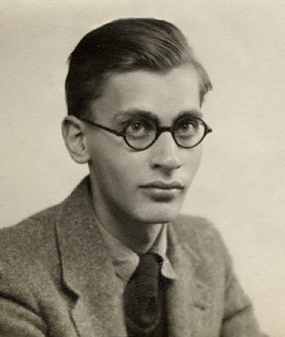
- Born: 11 January 1928; Berlin, Germany
- Died: 7 March 2011 (aged 83); London, England
- Citizenship: British
- Education: London School of Economics
- Scientific career
- Fields: History

John Ashley Soames Grenville (11 January 1928 – 7 March 2011) was a historian of the modern world.

== Biography ==
John Grenville was born Hans Guhrauer in Berlin, Germany on 11 January 1928. In 1939, he escaped the Holocaust via the Kindertransport with his brothers Julian and Walter, leaving behind their mother who was to join their father, who had already fled to England, later. The persecution of the Jews progressed faster than their father had anticipated and their mother died in the Riga Ghetto. He officially changed his name in 1949 to John Ashley Soames Grenville upon receiving British citizenship.

His father had limited means to support the family and John attended a boarding school in Essex, followed by attendance at Cambridge Technical School. He then took a gardening job in Peterhouse, Cambridge. He was given access to the library at the college, but only if he promised not to apply there. Thus, he began to study on his own during the day and take classes at Birkbeck College, London in the evening. He was awarded the London County Council Grant, which enabled him to attend the University of London.

He then attended Birkbeck College and the London School of Economics. He studied under Sir Charles Webster and received a First Class Honours Degree in History in 1951 and a PhD, for which he was awarded the Hutchinson Medal, in 1953. His dissertation was entitled Lord Salisbury and Foreign Policy: The Close of the 19th Century (1964). He was later a Commonwealth Fund Fellow at Yale University.

Grenville began his academic career at the University of Nottingham where he was an assistant Lecturer and Reader in History. He was Professor of International History at the University of Leeds from 1966 to 1969, then Professor and Head of the Department of Modern History at the University of Birmingham from 1969 to 1994. He later worked at Hamburg University and London's Leo Baeck Institute.

Grenville focused on portraying himself as an Englishman with German roots; thus, most of his studies revolved around this. He developed the international studies degree at Leeds, which focused on the use of film as a tool for understanding history. He lectured at many universities including the University of California and was known for his affable and good natured personality.

Grenville married twice. He met Betty Anne Rosenberg through a Harkness Fellowship at Yale; they had three sons together. However, she died of cancer and left him with three young sons to raise on his own. Not long afterwards he met Patricia Carnie. She had also lost her husband to a heart attack when pregnant and had since had a girl, Claire. Understanding each other's loss, they fell in love and married in 1975. The three sons, George, Edward, and Murray adored Claire whom they quickly accepted as their sister, and shortly afterwards Grenville officially adopted Claire. John and Patricia had also had a child together, Annabelle.

John Grenville died on 7 March in 2011. His final book, based in part on his own experiences, The Jews and Germans of Hamburg: The Destruction of a Civilization 1790-1945, was published shortly after his death. He was survived by his wife Patricia, his brother Walter, his sons, George, Edward, and Murray, and his daughters, Claire and Annabelle.

== Memorial ==
John A. S. Grenville PhD Studentship in Modern Jewish History and Culture awarded by the Leo Baeck Institute.

== Publications ==
- The Jews and Germans of Hamburg: The Destruction of a Civilization 1790 – 1945. Taylor & Francis, London 2011, ISBN 978-0-415-66586-5
- Preface to Leo Baeck Institute Yearbook LV (2010)
- Year Book of the Leo Baeck Institute, Oxford: Berghahn Books, 2007, (Co-Ed. with Raphael Gross)
- A History of the World from the 20th to the 21st Century. Routledge, London 2005, ISBN 0-415-28954-8
- The Collins History of the World in the Twentieth Century. London 1994, ISBN 0-00-255169-1
- The Major Treaties since 1945: A History and Guide with Texts. with Bernard Wasserstein, London 1987 ISBN 0-416-38080-8
- A World History of the 20th Century. London 1980, ISBN 0-00-635208-1
- Europe Reshaped: 1848-1878. Hassocks 1976, ISBN 0-85527-106-X
- Nazi Germany. Together with Ruth Barker, "History through the newsreel. the 1930s," Basingstoke 1976, ISBN 0-333-18554-4
- Film as History: The Nature of Film Evidence. Birmingham 1971, ISBN 0-85057-271-1
- The Major International Treaties, 1914-1945: A History and Guide with Texts. London 1974, ISBN 0-416-08092-8
- The Coming of the Europeans: A History of European Discovery and Settlement, 1415-1775 with G.J. Fuller, London 1966
- Politics, Strategy, and American Diplomacy: Studies in American Foreign Policy 1873-1917. ( Co-Author G.B. Young), 1966
- Lord Salisbury and Foreign Policy: The Close of the Nineteenth Century. University of London 1964, later edition Athlone press, London 1970
