= Ancient Asian history =

Ancient history in Asia is usually taken to include:

West Asia

- The Ancient Near East
- History of Iran, from Elam to the Sasanian Empire

South Asia

- History of India, from the Indus Valley Civilisation to the Iron Age in India
- Middle kingdoms of India, from the Maurya Empire to the Gupta Empire
- For southern India, History of South India#Ancient period
  - Southern kingdom of India, the Chola dynasty.

East Asia

- Iron Age China, from the Spring and Autumn period and the early imperial period under the Han dynasty
- History of China, from the Han dynasty to the Tang dynasty
- The Proto–Three Kingdoms period and Three Kingdoms of Korea
- The History of Japan from the Kofun period to the Heian period
- The Âu Lạc to the Second Era of Northern Domination in Vietnam

Southeast Asia

- History of Southeast Asia, from prehistory to Contemporary Southeast Asia.
