= Universal history =

Universal history may refer to:

- Universal history (genre), a literary genre
- Big History, an academic discipline that takes an astronomical perspective (from the Big Bang to the present)
- World history (field) or global history, a field of historical study that takes a worldwide/global perspective
- Human history, the history of human beings that takes a human perspective

== See also ==
- History of Earth, the history of planet Earth
- World history (disambiguation)
