= World history (disambiguation) =

World history or history of the world usually refers to human history, the history of human beings that takes a human perspective.

World history may also refer to:

== History and academics ==
- World history (field), or global history, a field of historical study that takes a worldwide/global perspective
- Big History, an academic discipline that takes an astronomical perspective (from the Big Bang to the present)
  - Chronology of the universe, the history and future of the universe according to Big Bang cosmology
    - History of Earth, the history of planet Earth
- Recorded history, the history of human beings from when human beings began writing events down (as opposed to prehistory and protohistory)
  - History of globalization, aspect of human history from the perspective of globalization

== Arts and entertainment ==
=== Music ===
- World History (album), a 1998 album by Christian rock band Mad at the World
- "The History of the World (Part 1)", a 1980 song by The Damned

=== Film and television ===
- History of the World, Part I, a 1981 film by Mel Brooks
- History of the World, Part II, a 2023 TV series
- Andrew Marr's History of the World, a 2012 BBC documentary television series presented by Andrew Marr

=== Literature ===
- History of the World (book), a 1944 book edited by William Nassau Weech
- The History of the World (Raleigh), a 1614 book

=== Gaming ===
- History of the World (board game), a 1991 board game designed by Gary Dicken and Steve Kendall
  - History of the World (video game), a 1997 computer game adaptation of the board game

== See also ==
- Timelines of world history
- Universal history (disambiguation)
  - Universal history (genre), a literary genre
- History of the Entire World, I Guess, a 2017 video by Bill Wurtz
